= List of ship decommissionings in 2005 =

The list of ship decommissionings in 2005 includes a chronological list of all ships decommissioned in 2005.

	Operator	Ship	Flag	Class and type	Fate	Other notes
17 February	United States Navy	Detroit		Sacramento-class fast combat support ship	Scrapped in 2006	
15 March	United States Navy	Seattle		Sacramento-class fast combat support ship	Scrapped in 2006	
23 March	United States Navy	Spruance		Spruance-class destroyer	Sunk as target	
31 March	Royal Navy	Norfolk		Type 23 frigate	Sold to Chile	
31 March	Royal Canadian Navy	Huron		Iroquois-class destroyer	Sunk as target	
29 June	United States Navy	Vincennes		Ticonderoga-class cruiser	Scrapped in 2011	
8 July	Royal Navy	Marlborough		Type 23 frigate	Sold to Chile	
14 July	Royal Navy	Cardiff		Type 42 destroyer (Batch 1)	Scrapped	
3 August	Royal Navy	Invincible		Invincible-class aircraft carrier	Scrapped	
3 August	Royal Norwegian Navy	Bergen		Oslo-class frigate	In use as office facility	
8 August	Royal Navy	Leeds Castle		Castle-class patrol vessel	Sold to Bangladesh	
19 August	United States Navy	O'Bannon		Spruance-class destroyer	Sunk as target	
15 September	United States Navy	Cushing		Spruance-class destroyer		
27 September	Royal Navy	Brecon		Hunt-class mine countermeasures vessel	Static training ship	
27 September	Royal Navy	Cottesmore		Hunt-class mine countermeasures vessel	Sold to Lithuania	
27 September	Royal Navy	Dulverton		Hunt-class mine countermeasures vessel	Sold to Lithuania	
13 October	United States Navy	Duluth		Austin-class amphibious transport dock		
14 October	United States Navy	Camden		Sacramento-class fast combat support ship	Undergoing scrapping	
28 October	United States Navy	Belleau Wood		Tarawa-class amphibious assault ship	Sunk as a target ship in 2006	
12 November	Royal Australian Navy	Canberra		Adelaide-class frigate	Awaiting conversion to dive wreck	
13 November	Royal New Zealand Navy	Wellington		Leander-class frigate	Sunk as dive wreck, was decommissioned 1999	formerly HMS Bacchante
14 December	United States Navy	Thomas S. Gates		Ticonderoga-class cruiser		
