= Sacrament (disambiguation) =

A sacrament is a Christian rite, including:

- Sacraments of the Catholic Church
- Holy Mysteries or Sacraments of the Eastern Orthodox Church (see Holy Mystery), analogous to Sacraments of the Catholic Church
- Lutheran sacraments
- Anglican sacraments
- Sacrament (Community of Christ), one of eight rites in the Community of Christ, formerly the Reorganized Church of Jesus Christ of Latter Day Saints
- Sacrament (LDS Church), a reference to the Lord's Supper, in The Church of Jesus Christ of Latter-day Saints
- Sacramenta Argentaria, the Oaths of Strasbourg
- Sacramental, a token object or action of respect (sacramentalia) associated with the Sacraments, meant to inspire or demonstrate piousness and devotion to God

Sacrament(s) or The Sacrament may also refer to:

== Film and television ==
- The Sacrament (1989 film), a Belgian comedy film
- The Sacrament (2013 film), an American horror film
- "Sacrament" (Mare of Easttown), a 2021 television episode
- "Sacrament" (Millennium), a 1997 television episode
- Sacrament (Big Love), an episode of the American TV series Big Love

== Literature ==
- Sacrament (novel), a 1996 novel by Clive Barker
- Sacrament, the 2003 expanded edition of You Shall Know Our Velocity, a 2002 novel by Dave Eggers

== Music ==
- Sacrament (band), an American Christian metal group
- Sacrament (album), by Lamb of God, 2006
- "The Sacrament" (song), by HIM, 2003

== See also ==
- Seven sacraments (disambiguation)
- Sacramento (disambiguation)
- Sacramentum (disambiguation)
