= USS Sacramento (AOE-1) =

Sacramento-class fast combat support ship

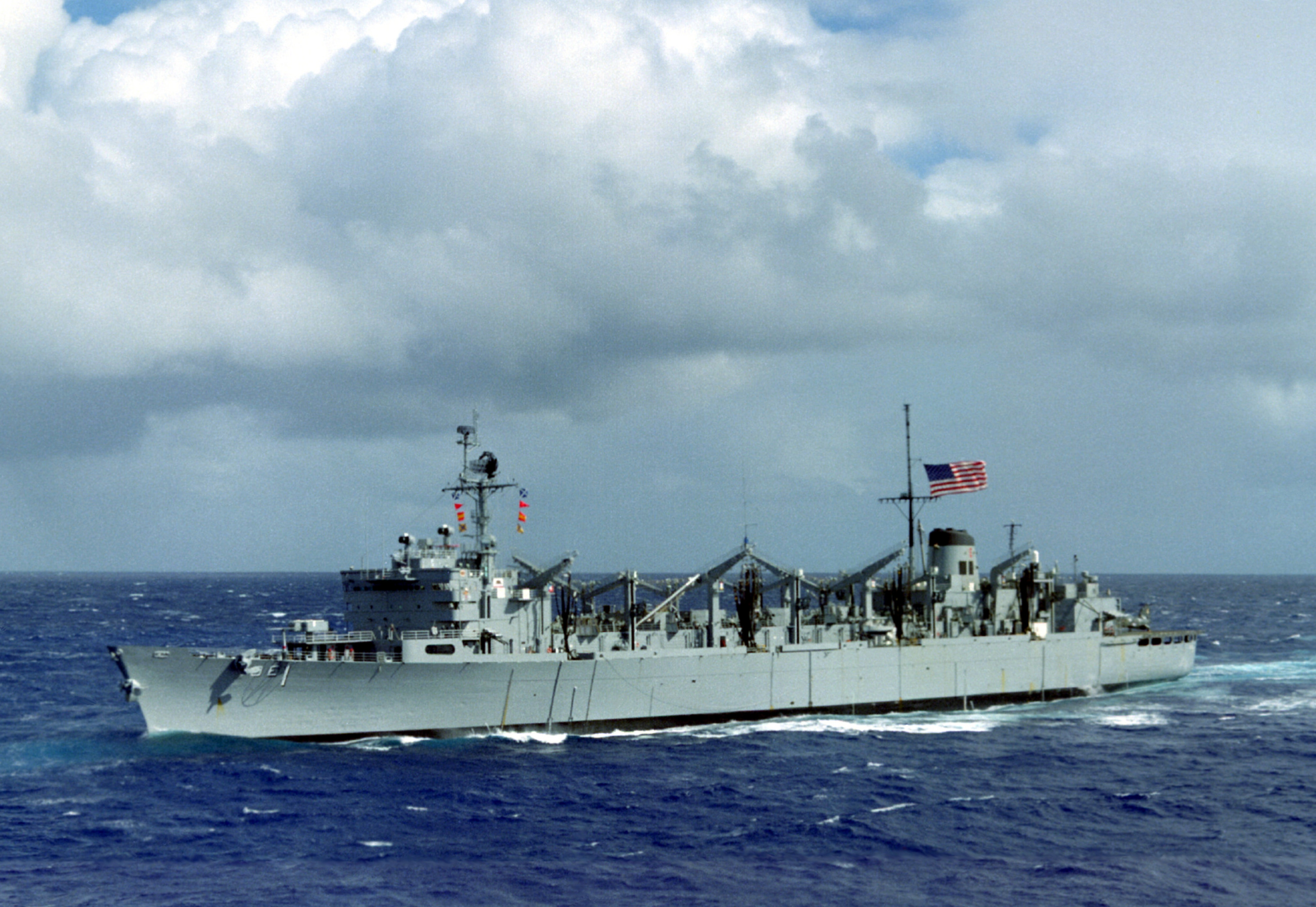
- USS Sacramento (AOE-1) underway in 1988

History

United States
- Name: USS Sacramento
- Namesake: Sacramento, California
- Ordered: 8 August 1960
- Builder: Puget Sound Naval Shipyard, Bremerton, Washington
- Laid down: 30 June 1961
- Launched: 14 September 1963
- Commissioned: 14 March 1964
- Decommissioned: 1 October 2004
- Stricken: 1 October 2004
- Home port: Bremerton, Washington
- Motto: Ready for Service
- Nickname(s): "Golden Bear"
- Fate: Scrapped at ESCO Marine, Brownsville (USA). Scrapping complete 11 July 2008

General characteristics
- Class & type: Sacramento-class fast combat support ship
- Displacement: 18,884 long tons (19,187 t) light; 54,000 long tons (54,867 t) full
- Length: 796 ft (243 m)
- Beam: 107 ft (33 m)
- Draft: 38 ft (12 m)
- Installed power: 100,000 shp (75 MW)
- Propulsion: 4 × Babcock & Wilcox water-tube boilers; 2 × General Electric double reduction cross-compound geared steam turbines; 2 × shafts with 23 ft (7.0 m) propellers
- Speed: 30 knots (56 km/h; 35 mph)+
- Capacity: Fuel Oil: 5.2 m gal (19.7 m L); Aviation fuel (JP-5): 2.7 m gal (10.2 m L)
- Complement: 34 officers and 602 enlisted
- Sensors & processing systems: Mark 56 fire-control system; Mark 23 Target Acquisition System
- Electronic warfare & decoys: AN/ALQ-32; AN/ALQ-25; Mark 36 SRBOC
- Armament: As built; 8 × 3-inch/50-caliber guns; 1976 - 1981; 4 × 3-inch/50-caliber guns; 1 × NATO Sea Sparrow Mark 29 missile launcher; 1981 - 1996; 2 × 20 mm Phalanx CIWS Mark 15 guns; 1 × NATO Sea Sparrow Mark 29 missile launcher; 1996 - 2004; 2 × 20 mm Phalanx CIWS Mark 15 guns; 1 × 8 cell NATO Sea Sparrow Mark 29 missile launcher; 1 × 25 mm automatic cannon; 4 × 0.5 in (12.7 mm) machine guns
- Aircraft carried: 2 × CH-46A/D Sea Knight helicopters

USS Sacramento (AOE-1) was the third ship in the United States Navy to bear the name, for both the river, and the capital city of California. She was the lead ship of her class of fast combat support ship.

She combined the functions of three logistics ships in one hull; fleet oiler (AO), ammunition ship (AE), and refrigerated stores ship (AFS).

Admiral Arleigh Burke originated the concept of a single supply ship system. He saw the design as an answer to logistics problems he encountered during World War II. The limited speed, range, and payload of early underway replenishment (UnRep) groups prevented resupply due to bad weather and tactical demands of the war. To counter these problems, the Fast Combat Support Ship (AOE) was designed.

== Construction ==
The keel for the first of the Navy's fast combat support ships was laid at Puget Sound Naval Shipyard, Bremerton, Washington on 30 June 1961. The traditional champagne bottle was broken against the bow of AOE-1 on 14 September 1963, by the ship's sponsor, Mrs. Edmund Brown, wife of the Governor of California.

Sacramento was commissioned on 15 March 1964. Undersecretary of the Navy, Paul B. Fay Jr., addressed the crowd, stating, "The greatest pleasure I have in being here today is ... participating in the commissioning of a vessel which will provide the Navy with a unique capability hitherto never contained in one ship." He added the ship would be able to "run in speed with a destroyer escort, thereby giving our fast attack carrier task forces a flexibility of action hitherto unknown."

== Service history ==
Sacramento served in the Gulf of Tonkin during the Vietnam War. She was known as a "floating supermarket" because of all the goods she carried.

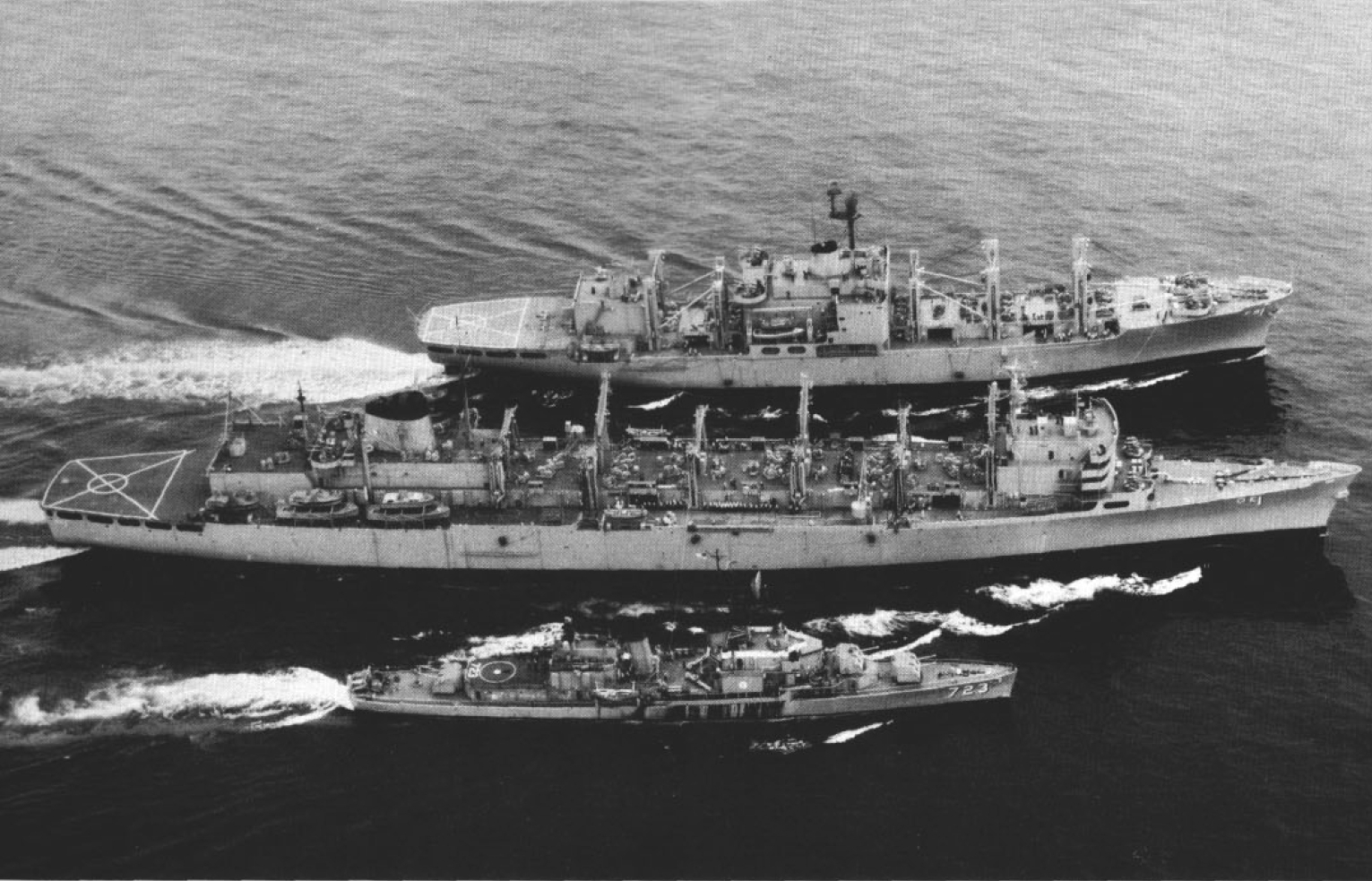
Sacramento refueling Mars and Walke in 1966.

The FAST (Fast Automated Shuttle Transfer) cargo handling system originally installed was replaced with the STREAM (Standard Tensioned Replenishment Alongside Method) underway replenishment system in 1977.

Her original armament consisted of four twin 3"/50 caliber guns. The two forward guns were replaced by Mk.29 NATO Sea Sparrow in 1976, and the two aft mounts were replaced by Mk.15 Phalanx CIWS in 1981.

Sacramento was deployed to the Persian Gulf and supported operations during the First Gulf War including Operations Desert Shield and Desert Storm.

In 1995, MK-23 TAS (Target Acquisition System) was installed to facilitate NSSMS and locate and track air threats.

In 1995 while in the Persian Gulf, the ship assisted in "Operation Southern Watch" and in "Operation Vigilant Sentinel". During an underway replenishment with the USS Abraham Lincoln the Sacramento lost her steering and collided into the starboard side of the Abraham Lincoln, crushing the M-frames, partially crushing a female crew berthing area, and punching a large hole in the TACAN room of the Sacramento. The Lincoln sustained damage to her catwalks, an aircraft elevator was jammed into the up position and an approximately 10 ft^{2} hole was torn into the island. Both ships had to dock at Jebel Ali, U.A.E. for repair, the latter for several weeks.

In 1996 the Sacramento had one NATO Sea Sparrow launcher on the forecastle, two Phalanx CIWS past mid-ship port and starboard, one 25 mm automatic cannon on the port side, and four .50 caliber machine guns: two port and two starboard. The ship was also fitted with electronic warfare equipment: an AN/SLQ-32 with four MK.36 super-RBOC (Rapid Bloom Offboard Chaff) decoys, and an AN/SLQ-25 towed torpedo decoy (NIXIE) run by an electronics technician.

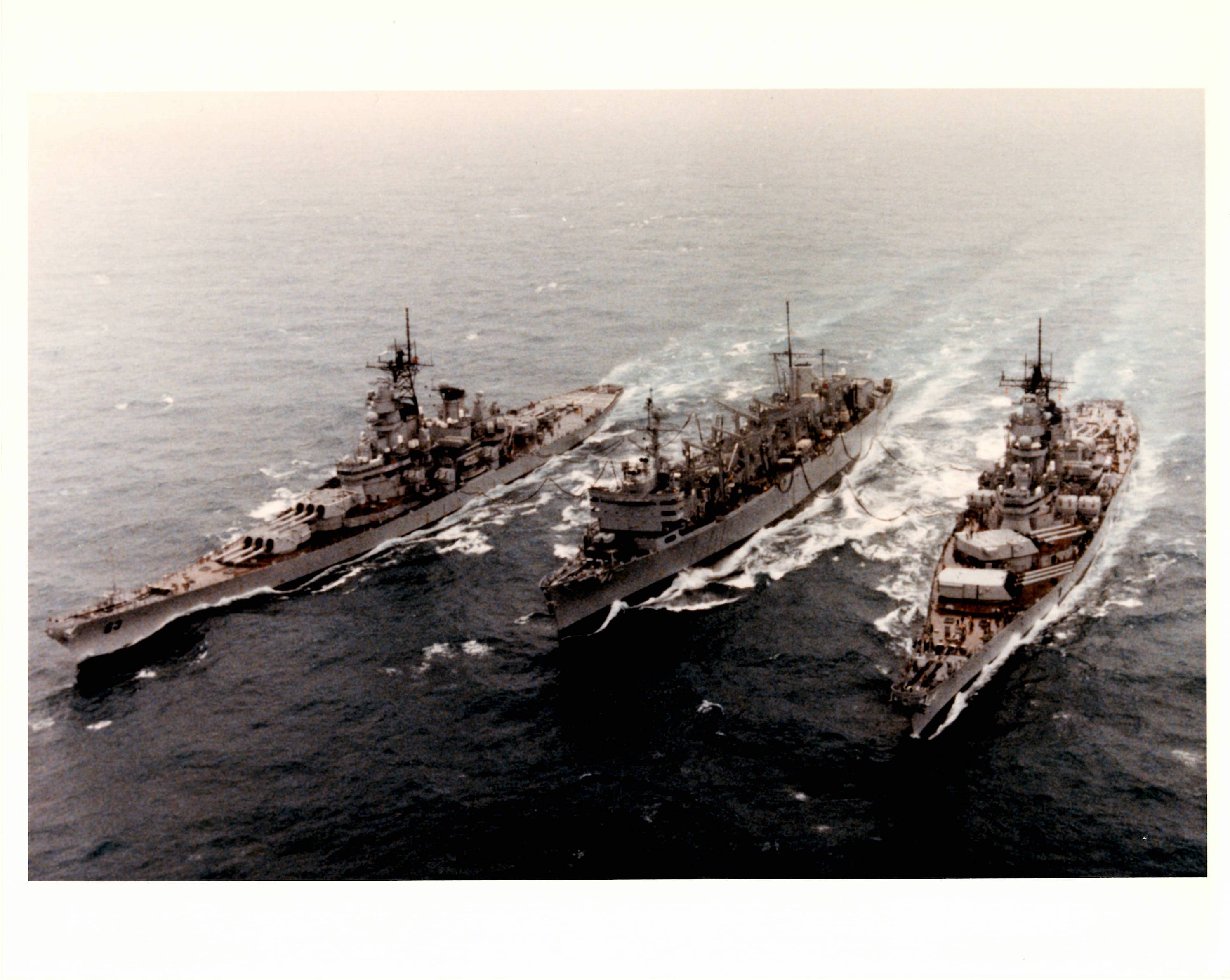
Sacramento (AOE-1) simultaneous UNREP with Wisconsin (BB-64) (foreground) and Missouri (BB-63) during Operation Desert Shield, January 1991.

Sacramento was the first AOE to ever qualify for an electromagnetic interference certificate in 1996.

Sacramento decommissioned in October 2004. On 13 April 2007, a contract for the ship's disposal was awarded to Esco Marine. Sacramento was scrapped by Esco Marine in Brownsville, Texas, early 2008.

== Performance ==
Sacramento is considered a benchmark in West Coast shipbuilding. The ship and two of her sister ships, Seattle (AOE-3) and Detroit (AOE-4), are the largest ships ever built on the West Coast as of 2005. Only Iowa-class battleships and aircraft carriers have greater displacements than Sacramento.

The ship's main engines came from the never-completed battleship Kentucky (BB-66), and delivered in excess of 100,000 shaft horsepower (75 MW) to two 23-foot (7 m) screws weighing 19.25 tons each, the largest on any ship in the Navy.

Sacramento was the fastest AOE (fast combat support ship) ever. The Sacramento routinely went head-to-head in speed runs and won against the west coast's AOE's, including the Camden (AOE-2) and the Rainier (AOE-7). Sacramento also beat the fastest of the east coast AOE's, including the Detroit (AOE-4) and the Arctic (AOE-8) in head-to-head competition.

== Awards ==
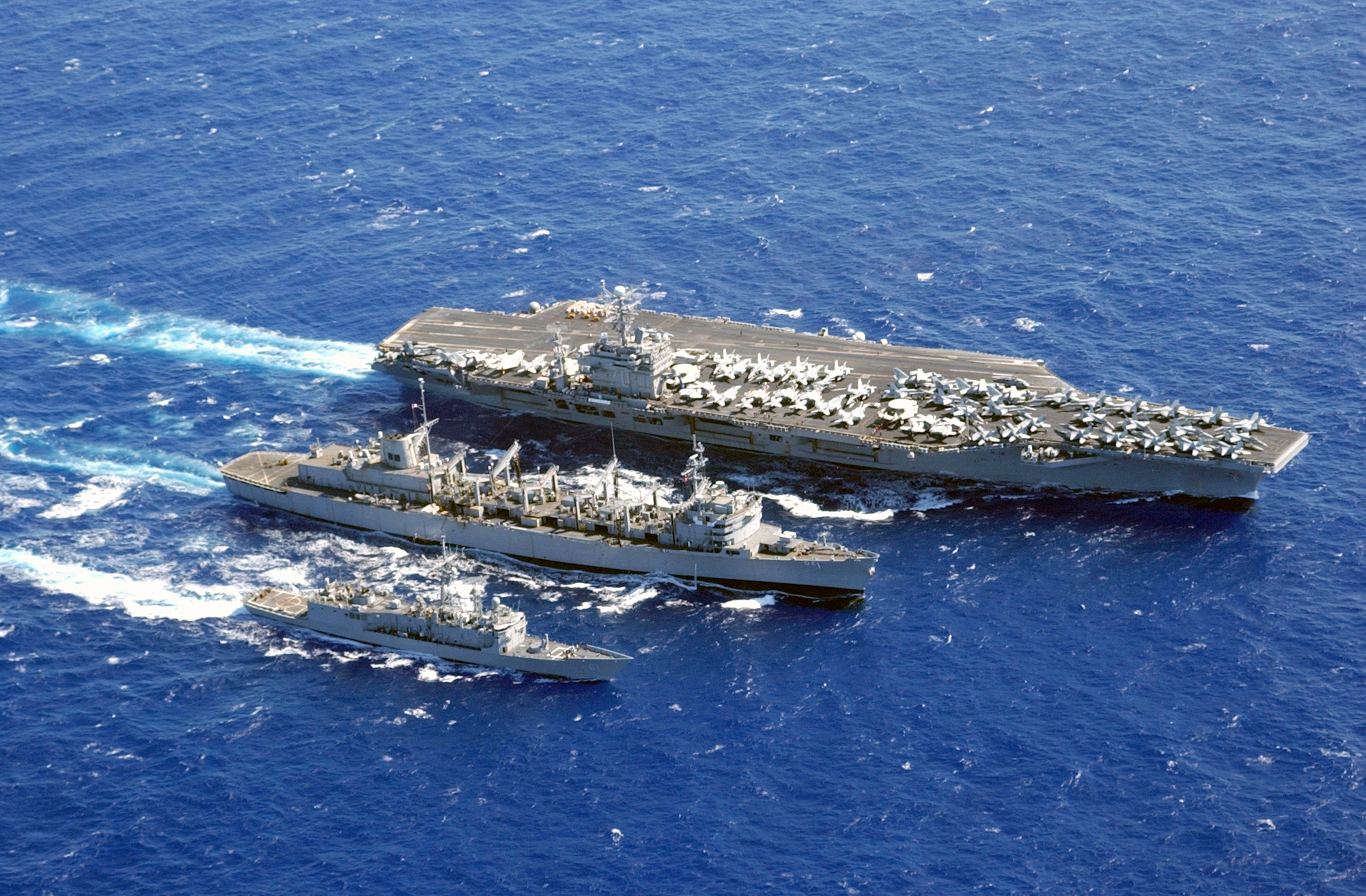
Sacramento replenishing Carl Vinson and Ingraham in 2003.

- Joint Meritorious Unit Award
- Navy Unit Commendation – 2 awards
- Meritorious Unit Citation – 3 awards
- Navy E Ribbon – 4 awards
- Navy Expeditionary Medal – 2 awards
- National Defense Service Medal – 3 awards
- Armed Forces Expeditionary Medal – 7 awards
- Vietnam Service Medal with 13 campaign stars
- Southwest Asia Service Medal with 3 campaign stars
- Global War on Terrorism Expeditionary Medal
- Global War on Terrorism Service Medal
- Republic of Vietnam Campaign Medal
- Kuwait Liberation Medal
