= Battle of Sacramento =

Battle of Sacramento may refer to the following conflicts:

- Battle of Sacramento (Mexico), February 28, 1847, in Chihuahua, Mexico, during the Mexican–American War
- Battle of Sacramento (Kentucky), December 28, 1861, in Sacramento, Kentucky, during the American Civil War

== See also ==
- Sacramento River massacre, April 5, 1846, at the Sacramento River in California
- Sacramento shooting (disambiguation)
- Sacramento (disambiguation)
