= Sacramentum =

Sacramentum is a Latin word meaning "oath" and later "sacrament," and may refer to:

- Sacramentum (oath), a Roman oath
- Sacramentum caritatis, a post-synodal apostolic exhortation published in 2007
- Sacramentum Poenitentiae, an apostolic constitution published by Pope Benedict XIV in 1741

== Other ==
- Sacramentum (band), a black metal band

== See also ==
- Sacrament (disambiguation)
- Sacramento (disambiguation)
