= Sacramento shooting =

Sacramento shooting or Sacramento massacre may refer to:

- Sacramento River massacre
- 1991 Sacramento hostage crisis
- 2001 Sacramento shootings
- A shooting by Luis Bracamontes in 2014 that killed two police officers
- Shooting of Stephon Clark in 2018
- 2022 Sacramento shooting

== See also ==
- Battle of Sacramento (disambiguation)
- Sacramento (disambiguation)
