= USS Sacramento =

The name USS Sacramento has been borne by three ships in the United States Navy. The first was named for the Sacramento River, the second for the Sacramento, California and the third for both.

- The first USS Sacramento (1862) was a sloop, launched in 1862 and wrecked in 1867.
- The second USS Sacramento (PG-19) was a gunboat, commissioned in 1914 and decommissioned in 1946.
- The third USS Sacramento (AOE-1) was the lead ship of Sacramento-class fast combat support ships, commissioned in 1964 and decommissioned in 2004.
