= Seven sacraments =

The expression seven sacraments mainly refers to:

- Sacrament
  - Sacraments of the Catholic Church
  - Eastern Orthodox Church § Holy mysteries (sacraments)
  - Anglican sacraments
  - Sacrament § Hussite Church and Moravian Church

It can also refer to:

== Art ==
- Seven Sacraments Altarpiece
- Seven Sacraments (Poussin)
- The Seven Sacraments of Nicolas Poussin

== See also ==
- Sacrament (disambiguation)
