= Sac City =

Sac City may refer to:

- Sac City, Iowa
- Sacramento City College
- City of Sacramento

== See also ==
- Sacramento City (disambiguation)
