= USS Kentucky (BB-66) =

Uncompleted battleship of the United States Navy

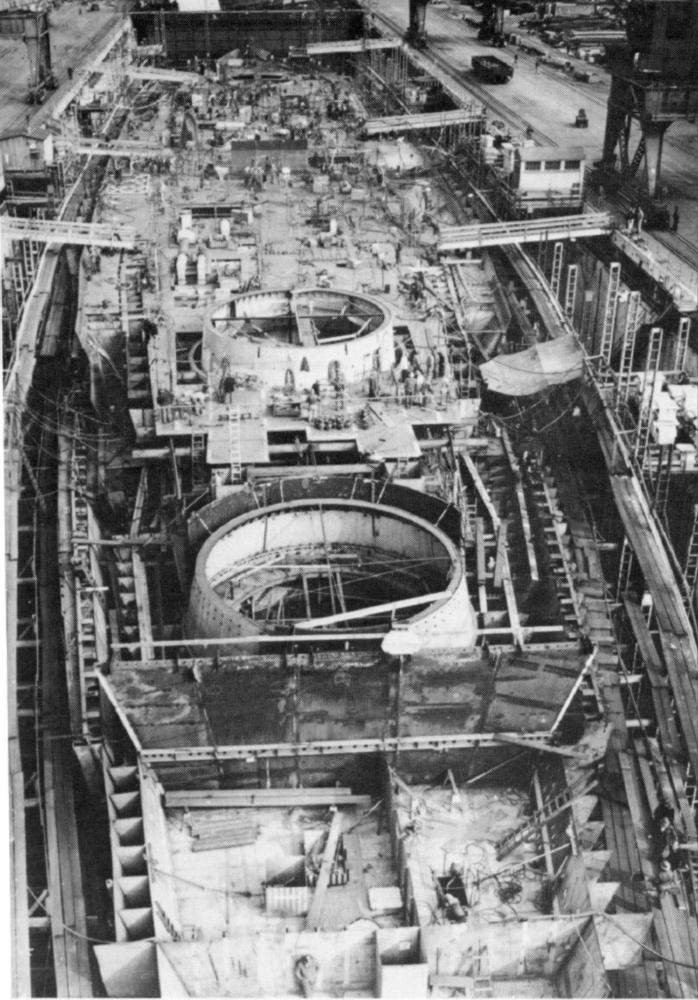
- Kentucky under construction; the round barbettes which would have held her 16-inch (406 mm) main battery are prominent

History

United States
- Namesake: State of Kentucky
- Ordered: 9 September 1940
- Builder: Norfolk Naval Shipyard
- Laid down: 7 March 1942
- Launched: 20 January 1950
- Completed: Not completed
- Reclassified: BBG-1 from BB-66
- Stricken: 9 June 1958
- Fate: Sold for scrapping 31 October 1958

General characteristics (as planned)
- Class & type: Iowa-class battleship
- Displacement: 45,000 long tons (46,000 t) light; 55,250 long tons (56,140 t) full load
- Length: 887 ft 3 in (270.43 m)
- Beam: 108 ft 2 in (32.97 m)
- Draft: 35 ft 10 in (10.92 m) (full load)
- Installed power: 212,000 shp (158,000 kW)
- Speed: 33 kn (38 mph; 61 km/h)
- Complement: 151 officers, 2,637 enlisted
- Armament: 9 × 16 in (406 mm)/50 cal Mark 7 guns; 20 × 5 in (127 mm)/38 cal Mark 12 guns; 80 × 40 mm/56 cal anti-aircraft guns; 49 × 20 mm/70 cal anti-aircraft guns
- Armor: Belt: 12.1 in (307 mm); Bulkheads: 14.5 in (368 mm); Barbettes: 11.6 to 17.3 in (295 to 439 mm); Turrets: 19.5 in (495 mm); Decks: main 1.5 in (38 mm); second 6.0 in (152 mm)
- Aircraft carried: 3 × Vought OS2U Kingfisher/Curtiss SC Seahawk floatplanes

USS Kentucky (Note: Although Kentucky was never commissioned by the U.S. Navy, and therefore did not officially receive the USS ship prefix, she is conventionally referred to as USS Kentucky.) (hull number BB-66) was an uncompleted battleship intended to be the last ship of the Iowa class. Hull BB-66 was originally to be the second ship of the Montana-class battleships. However, the urgent need for more warships at the outbreak of World War II and the U.S. Navy's experiences in the Pacific theater led it to conclude that rather than battleships larger and more heavily armed than the Iowa class, it quickly needed more fast battleships of that class to escort the new Essex-class aircraft carriers being built. As a result, hulls BB-65 and BB-66 were reordered and laid down as Iowa-class battleships in 1942.

As such, she was intended to be the sixth and final member of the Iowa-class constructed. At the time of her construction she was the second ship of the United States Navy to be named in honor of the U.S. state of Kentucky. Like her sister ship Illinois, laid down as one of the last pair of Iowa-class ahead of her, Kentucky was still under construction at the end of hostilities and became caught up in the post-war draw-down of the armed services. Her construction was suspended twice, during which times she served as a parts hulk. In the 1950s, several proposals were made to complete the ship as a guided missile battleship, abandoned primarily due to cost concerns and the rapid pace of evolving missile technology. Kentucky ultimately was sold for scrap in 1958.

== Background ==
Kentucky was conceived in 1935, when the United States Navy initiated design studies for the creation of an extended South Dakota class that was not restricted by the Second London Naval Treaty. This resulted in one of the "fast battleship" designs planned in 1938 by the Preliminary Design Branch at the Bureau of Construction and Repair.

The passage of the Second Vinson Act in 1938 had cleared the way for construction of the four South Dakota-class battleships and the first two Iowa-class fast battleships (those with the hull numbers BB-61 and BB-62). The latter four battleships of the class, those designated with the hull numbers BB-63, BB-64, BB-65, and BB-66 (Missouri, Wisconsin, Illinois, and Kentucky, respectively) were not cleared for construction until 12 July 1940. While BB-63 and BB-64 were originally planned as the final ships in the Iowa-class, BB-65 and BB-66 were intended to be the first ships of the Montana class which was larger and slower while mounting twelve 16 in (406 mm) Mark 7 guns. However, the passage of an emergency war building program on 19 July 1940 resulting in Illinois and Kentucky being re-ordered as the fifth and sixth ships, respectively, of the Iowa class in order to save time on construction, so the first ship of the Montana-class would be reassigned as BB-67. The orders for BB-65 and BB-66 were placed on 9 September 1940, and the ships were laid down on 6 December 1942, and 7 March 1942, respectively.

By 1942 the United States Navy shifted its building focus from battleships to aircraft carriers after the successes of carrier combat in both the Battle of the Coral Sea, and to a greater extent, the Battle of Midway. As a result, the construction of the US fleet of Essex-class aircraft carriers had been given the highest priority for completion in the US shipyards by the US Navy. The Essex-class carriers were proving vital to the war effort by enabling the Allies to gain and maintain air supremacy in the Pacific War, and were rapidly becoming the principal striking arm of the United States Navy in the ongoing effort to defeat the Empire of Japan. Accordingly, the United States accepted shortcomings in the armor of their Iowa-class battleships in favor of additional speed, which could steam at a comparable speed with the Essex-class and provide the carriers with the maximum amount of anti-aircraft protection. As a result, construction of the Montana-class was canceled before their keels could be laid.

== Construction ==
Kentucky's main battery would have consisted of nine 16 in (406 mm)/50 cal Mark 7 guns, which could hurl 2,700 lb (1,225 kg) armor-piercing shells some 20 mi (32 km). Her secondary battery would have consisted of 20 5 in (127 mm)/38 cal guns arranged in 10 turrets, which could fire at targets up to 10 mi (16 km) away. With the advent of air power and the mandate to gain and maintain air superiority came a need to protect the growing fleet of Allied aircraft carriers. To this end, Kentucky was to be fitted with an array of Oerlikon 20 mm and Bofors 40 mm anti-aircraft guns to defend allied carriers from enemy airstrikes.

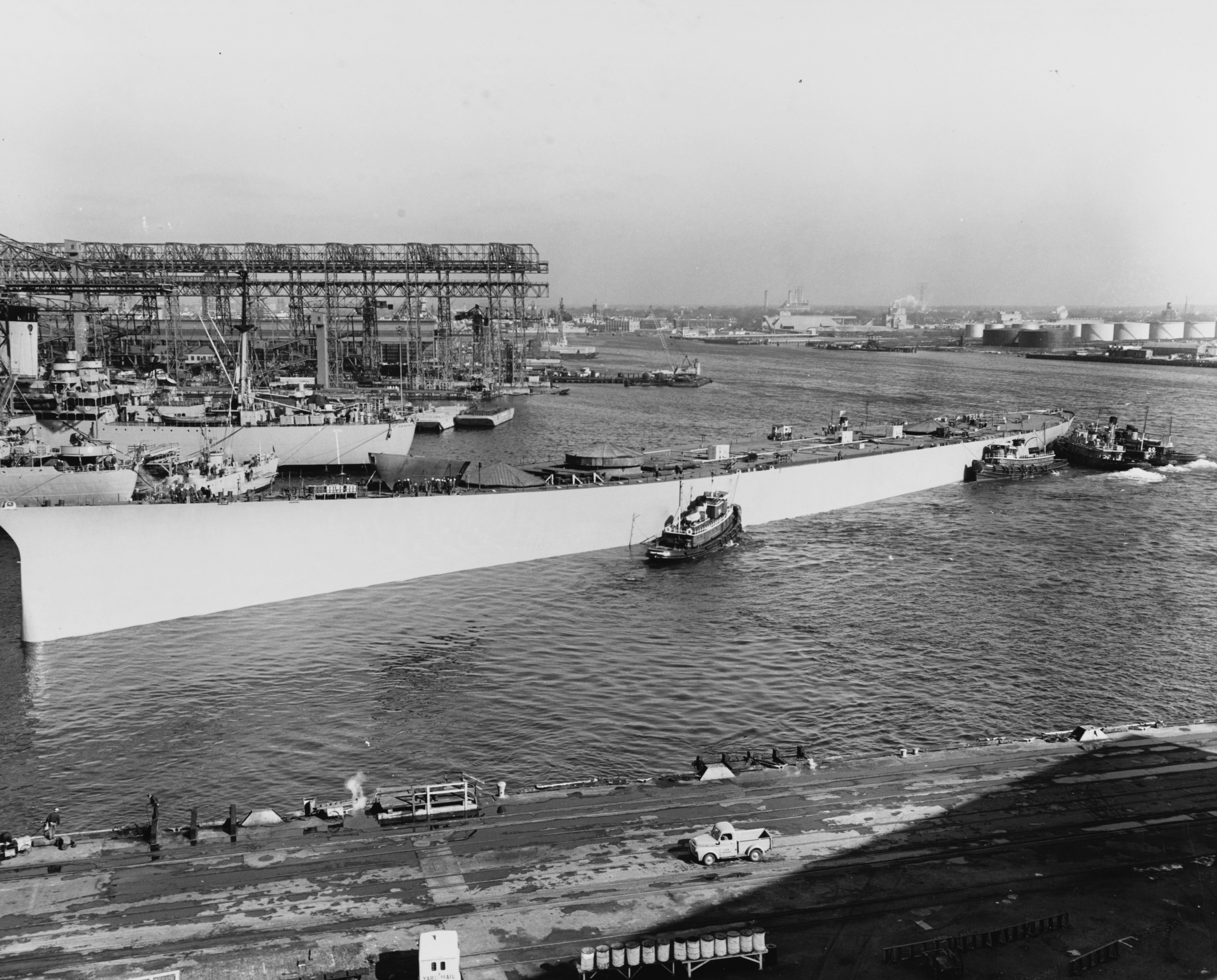
The hull of the incomplete Kentucky is floated out of drydock in early 1950 to allow USS Missouri (BB-63) to drydock for repairs after she had run aground

Like Iowa-class ships from Missouri (hull number BB-63) onwards, the frontal bulkhead armor was increased from the original 11.3 in (287 mm) to 14.5 in (368 mm) in order to better protect against fire from frontal sectors. Because the torpedo defense on the Iowa class was virtually the same as the preceding South Dakota class it was proposed that Illinois's and Kentucky's hull be redesigned to provide a greater degree of torpedo protection for the battleship. Under the original construction schematics for the class each side of the ship was protected below the waterline by two tanks mounted outside the belt armor, and separated by a bulkhead. These tanks were initially planned to be empty, but in practice were filled with water or fuel oil. The armored belt tapered to a thickness of 4 inches (100 mm) below the waterline. Behind the armored belt there was a void, and then another bulkhead. The outer hull was intended to detonate a torpedo, with the outer two compartments absorbing the shock and with any splinters or debris being stopped by the armored belt and the empty compartment behind it. In 1939 the Navy discovered that this system was less effective than the earlier torpedo defense system of the North Carolina-class due to the excessive rigidity of the lower belt armor causing leakage into adjacent compartments. Subsequently, the design of the torpedo defense system was modified for Illinois and Kentucky, such as eliminating knuckles along certain holding bulkheads; the intended construction format was estimated to provide up to 20% improvement to the torpedo defense of the battleship while simultaneously reducing flooding in the event of a torpedo strike.

Kentucky's construction was plagued by suspensions. Her keel was laid down at the Norfolk Navy Yard, Portsmouth, Virginia, on 7 March 1942. However, work on the ship was suspended in June that year, and Kentucky's bottom structure was launched to make room for LST construction on 10 June. Work on the ship resumed on 6 December 1944, when the keel structure was moved to Dry Dock 8. Work on the battleship proceeded at a slow pace, and her completion was projected for the third quarter of 1946. In December 1945 it was recommended that Kentucky be completed as an anti-aircraft battleship, and work on the ship was suspended in August 1946 while this was considered. Construction resumed again on 17 August 1948 without any decision having been made on her final design. Work on Kentucky continued until 20 January 1950, when it was decided to halt work on the ship. Following this, she was floated out of her drydock to clear a space for repairs to sister ship Missouri, which had run aground en route from Hampton Roads.

== Conversion proposals ==
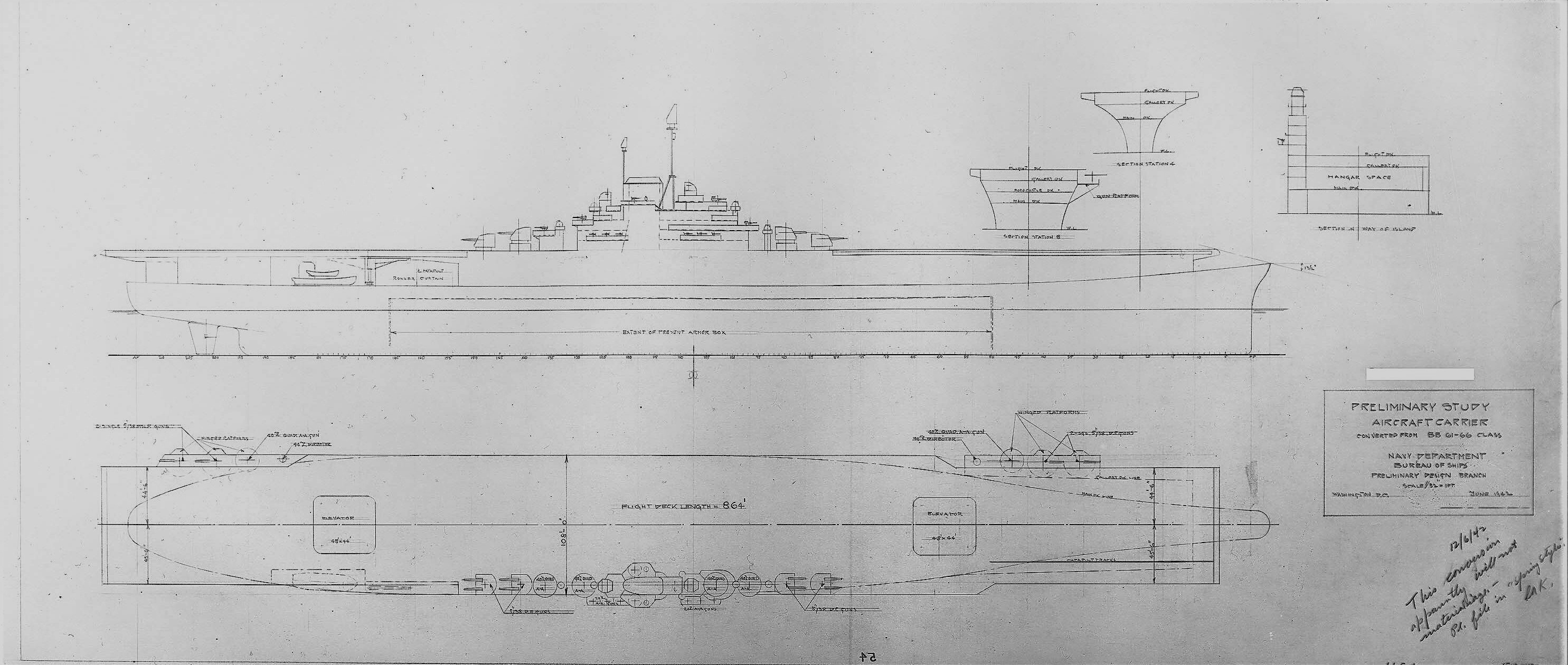
Line drawings of the proposed aircraft carrier conversion for Kentucky

While her construction was suspended, the Bureau of Ships considered an aircraft carrier conversion proposal for Kentucky and Illinois in the aftermath of the Battles of Coral Sea and Midway. As proposed, the converted Kentucky would have had an 864-foot (263 m) long by 108-foot (33 m) wide flight deck, with armament identical to the carriers of the Essex class: four twin 5-inch gun mounts and four more 5-inch guns in single mounts, along with six 40 mm quadruple mounts. The idea was abandoned after the Bureau of Ships decided that the converted ships would carry fewer aircraft than the Essex class, that more Essex-class carriers could be built in the same amount of time, and that the conversion project would be significantly more expensive than new Essexes. Instead, Kentucky and Illinois were to be completed as battleships, but their construction was given very low priority.

As early as 1946, missile conversion projects for Kentucky (project SCB 19) and the incomplete large cruiser USS Hawaii were discussed. In the early 1950s, the advances in guided missile technology led to a proposal to create a large warship armed with both guns and missiles. To this end, the incomplete Kentucky was chosen for conversion from an all gun ship into a "guided missile battleship". This proposal would have been relatively conservative, and would have involved the installation of a pair of twin arm launchers for the RIM-2 Terrier surface-to-air missile (SAM) on the aft deckhouse, with a pair of antennas for the associated AN/APG-55 pulse doppler interception radar installed forward of these, and the AN/SPS-2B air search radar on a short mast. Since the battleship was already approximately 73% complete (construction had been halted at the second deck), installation of the missile system and associated electronics would have involved only adding the necessary equipment without any need to rebuild the ship to accommodate the system. (Note: The addition of missiles to a battleship had already been done aboard the battleship Mississippi (BB-41/AG-128) to test the Terrier missile after World War II. See DANFS Mississippi (BB-41). More recently, this was done to the four completed Iowa-class battleships to allow them to carry and launch BGM-109 Tomahawk missiles and RGM-84 Harpoon missiles. (United States General Accounting Office (20 April 1981). "Update of the Issues Concerning the Proposed Reactivation of the Iowa class battleships and the Aircraft Carrier Oriskany" (PDF). United States General Accounting Office. pp. 3–18. Archived from the original (PDF) on 20 June 2007.)) Some guided missile concepts included one or two launchers for eight SSM-N-9 Regulus II or SSM-N-2 Triton nuclear cruise missiles. The guided missile battleship project was authorized in 1954, and Kentucky was renumbered from BB-66 to BBG-1, with the conversion due to be complete in 1956. However, the project was soon cancelled, with the conversion ideas transferred to a smaller platform that led to the Boston-class guided missile cruiser. These partial conversions of two Baltimore-class heavy cruisers proved only partially successful in their new role, as the pace of change in cruise missile technology rendered their new weapons systems obsolete, while their remaining heavy guns proved in demand.

Another conversion project in early 1956 called for the installation of two Polaris nuclear ballistic missile launchers with a capacity for sixteen weapons. Also proposed were four RIM-8 Talos SAM launchers with eighty missiles per launcher and twelve RIM-24 Tartar SAM launchers with 504 missiles. A July 1956 estimate projected completing the ship by July 1961, but the cost of the conversion ultimately forced the Navy to abandon the project.

== Fate ==
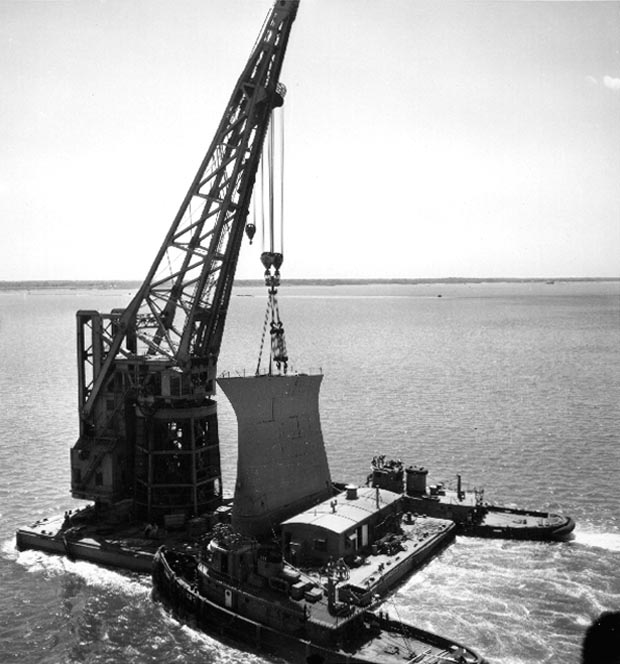
Kentucky's bow being transported by barge to repair Wisconsin

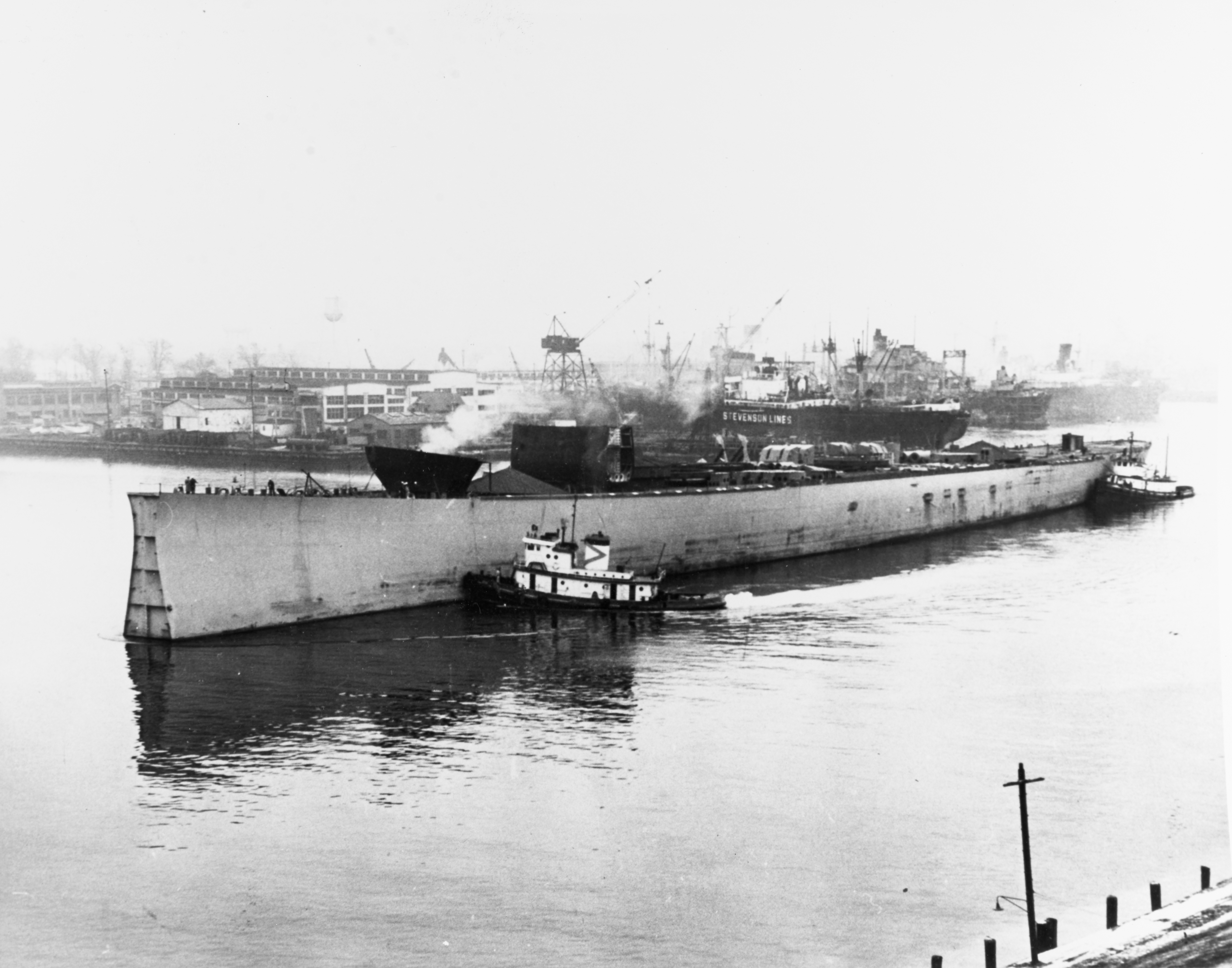
Kentucky being towed to the scrapyard, less her severed bow

Kentucky was never completed, instead serving as a parts hulk while in the mothball fleet at the Philadelphia Naval Shipyard from about 1950 to 1958. Hurricane Hazel hit the area on 15 October 1954, causing Kentucky to break free from her moorings and run aground in the Delaware River. In 1956, Kentucky's bow was removed and used in the repair of Wisconsin, which had been damaged in a collision with the destroyer USS Eaton on 6 May 1956. Congressman William Huston Natcher attempted to block the sale of the ship by objecting to the bill in August 1957. Nevertheless, Kentucky was struck from the Naval Vessel Register on 9 June 1958 and her incomplete hulk was sold for scrapping to Boston Metals Company of Baltimore, Maryland on 31 October for $1,176,666. She was towed to their shipyard in Baltimore in February 1959.

Kentucky's four 600 psi (4.1 MPa) boilers and turbine sets were used to power the first two Sacramento-class fast combat support ships, Sacramento laid down in 1961 and Camden in 1964. When the Navy switched to 1,200 psi (8.3 MPa) boilers, sailors who had served aboard Sacramento and Camden provided the experience to operate the older lower-pressure boilers aboard New Jersey during her combat tour in the Vietnam War and aboard all four of the Iowas when they were recalled and modernized in the 1980s as part of the 600-ship Navy plan. A pair of 150-pound (68 kg) mahogany doors that had been donated by the state of Kentucky while the ship was under construction were removed and used in an officer's club in New York City before eventually being returned to the Kentucky Historical Society in early January 1994.
