= Homer N. Wallin =

United States Navy vice admiral

Homer Norman Wallin
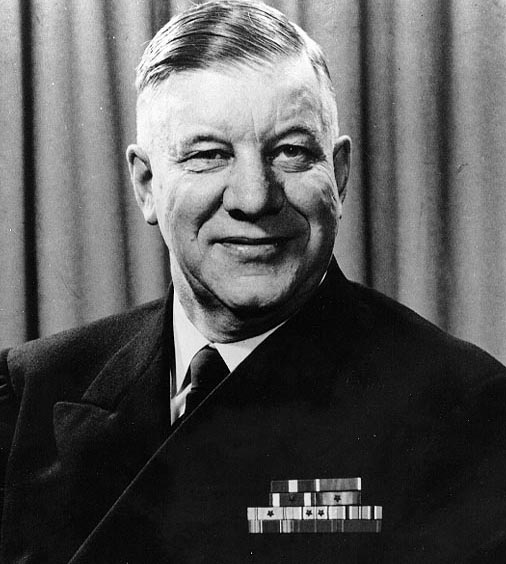
- Vice Admiral Homer Norman Wallin
- Born: December 6, 1893; Washburn, North Dakota, U.S.
- Died: March 6, 1984 (aged 90); Seattle, Washington, U.S.
- Military career
- Allegiance: United States
- Branch: United States Navy
- Service years: 1917–1955
- Rank: Vice Admiral
- Conflicts: World War I World War II; Cold War
- Awards: Navy Distinguished Service Medal; Legion of Merit; Navy Commendation Medal (2)

Homer Norman Wallin (December 6, 1893 – March 6, 1984) was a vice admiral in the United States Navy, best known for his salvage of ships sunk in the attack on Pearl Harbor.

== Biography ==
Wallin was born in Washburn, North Dakota. Following brief attendance at the University of North Dakota and a year in the state National Guard, he was appointed to the U.S. Naval Academy in 1913. He graduated in March 1917 and was commissioned in the rank of Ensign. During most of World War I, he served in the battleship New Jersey (BB-16). In September 1918, he was transferred to the navy's Construction Corps and was sent to the Massachusetts Institute of Technology for postgraduate education in naval architecture.

After receiving his Master of Science degree in 1921, Wallin served for four years at the New York Navy Yard. He was assigned to the Bureau of Construction and Repair in Washington, D.C., in 1925 to 1929. Over the following decade he had successive tours at the Mare Island and Philadelphia Navy Yards and at the Bureau of Construction and Repair (redesignated the Bureau of Ships in 1940). During this time, Wallin met and married his wife Elizabeth, and had two children, son Homer Norman, Jr. and daughter Susan Ann.

In 1941, Captain Wallin became material officer for commander, Battle Force, U.S. Pacific Fleet, and was serving in that position when Japan attacked Pearl Harbor on December 7, 1941. Early in the following year, he was placed in charge of the Pearl Harbor Navy Yard's Salvage Division. Through most of 1942, he directed the Pearl Harbor ship salvage effort, a huge task that enabled the navy to recover the use of three sunken battleships. From November 1942 to August 1943, he was force maintenance officer for the South Pacific Force, then spent a few months at the Bureau of Ships. Rear Admiral Wallin was supervisor of shipbuilding and inspector of ordnance at Seattle and commander of the naval station at Tacoma, Washington, beginning in October 1943.

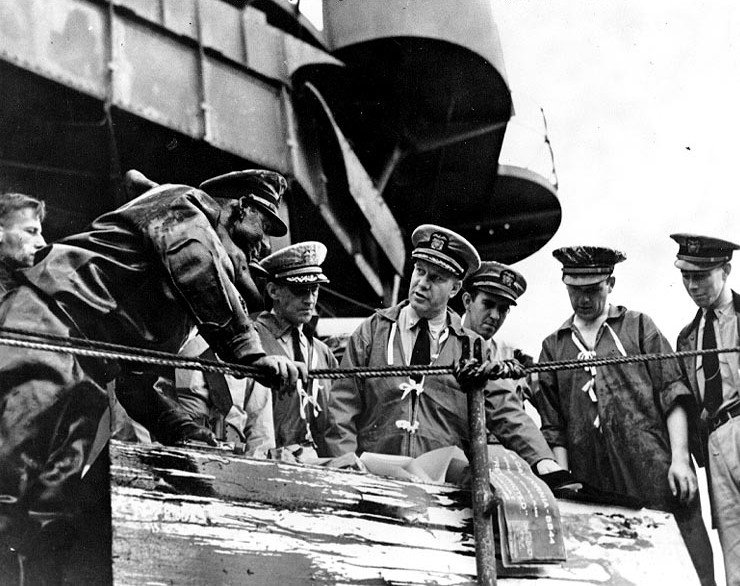
Captain Homer N. Wallin (center) supervises salvage operations aboard USS California, early 1942 at Pearl Harbor.

== Post-World War II Career ==
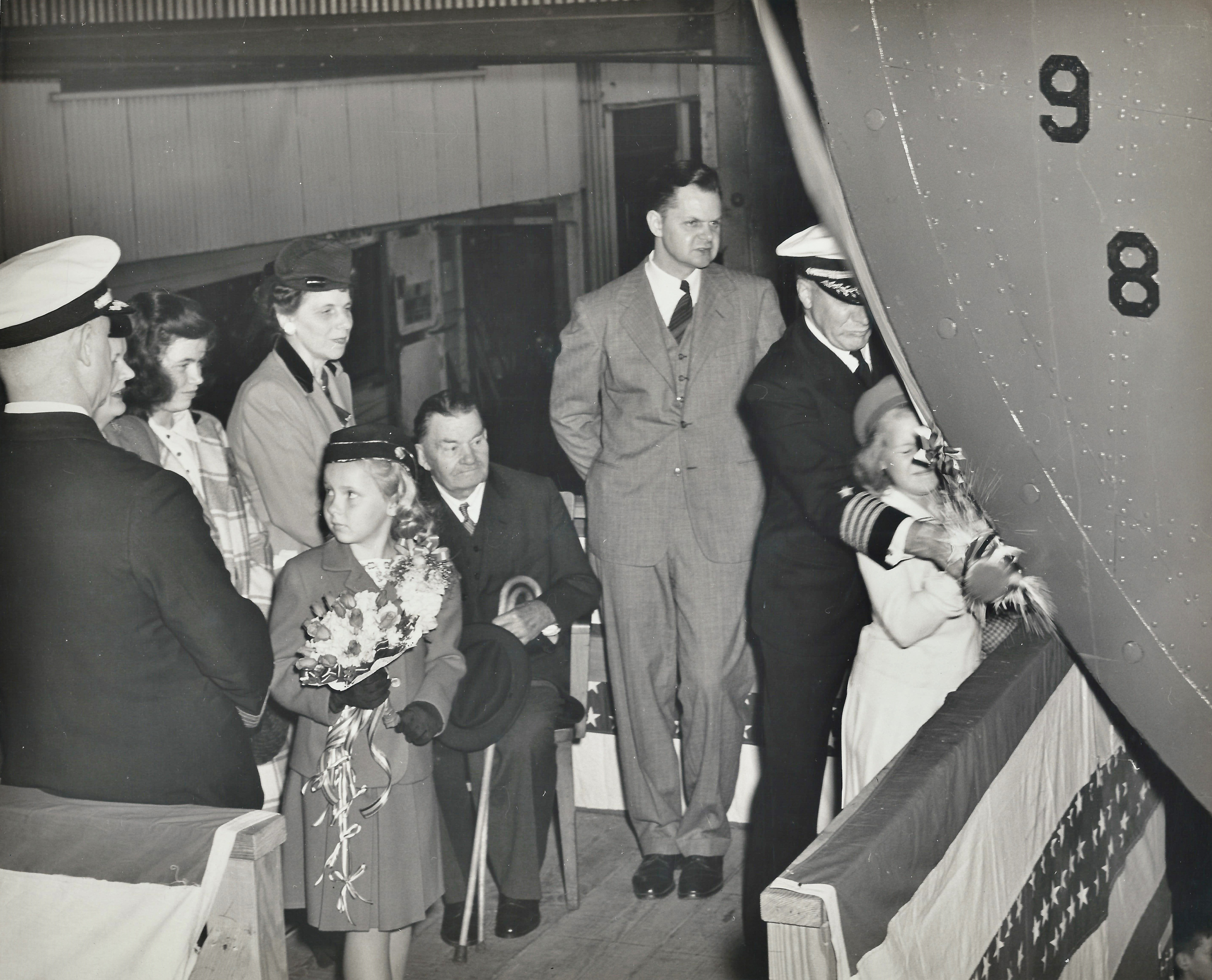
Christening of USS Kwajalein with daughter Susan Ann, 4 May 1944

Because of his prior experience in salvaging the ships after the Attack on Pearl Harbor, Wallin was selected to command the salvage effort of the 1950 USS Missouri grounding.

Following World War II, Wallin commanded the Philadelphia and Norfolk Naval Shipyards. In February 1951, he became chief of the Bureau of Ships, a post he held until August 1953, when he took command of the Puget Sound Naval Shipyard. He retired from active service on May 1, 1955 and was simultaneously advanced to the rank of vice admiral on the basis of his combat awards.

In 1968, retired Vice Admiral Wallin published a memoir of his service, especially the Pearl Harbor salvage operations, titled Pearl Harbor: Why, How, Fleet Salvage and Final Appraisal.

Vice Admiral Homer N. Wallin died on March 6, 1984 in Seattle, Washington. He is interred at Willamette National Cemetery, Portland, Oregon.

== Decorations ==

Navy Distinguished Service Medal		Legion of Merit
Navy Commendation Medal w/ 5/16" Gold Star	World War I Victory Medal w/ Escort Clasp	American Defense Service Medal w/ bronze "A" Device
American Campaign Medal	Asiatic-Pacific Campaign Medal w/ two 3/16" bronze stars	World War II Victory Medal
National Defense Service Medal	Navy Rifle Marksmanship Ribbon	Navy Pistol Marksmanship Ribbon
