= 1950 USS Missouri grounding =

USS Missouri grounding incident
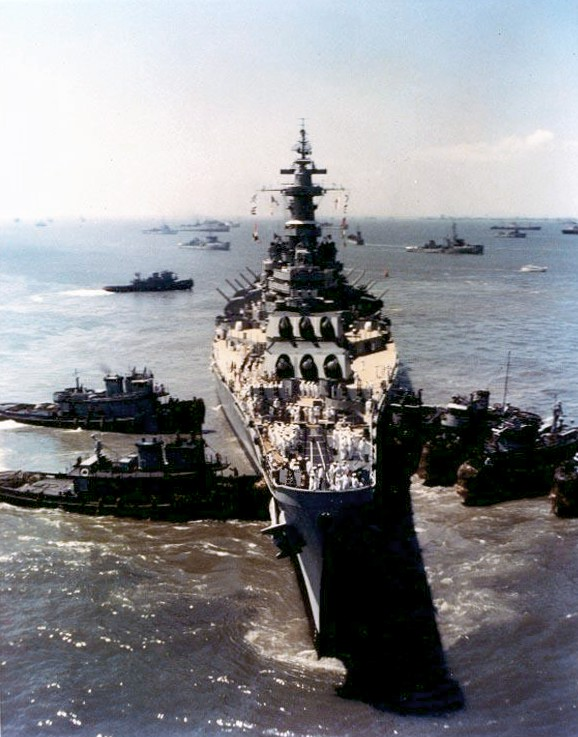
- Tugboats surround USS Missouri during an attempt to free her 21 January 1950
- Date: 17 January 1950
- Location: Thimble Shoal Light, near Old Point Comfort
- Cause: Negligence
- Outcome: Battleship hull damaged

The USS Missouri grounding occurred 17 January 1950 when the battleship USS Missouri (BB-63) ran aground while sailing out of Chesapeake Bay. No one was injured, but the battleship remained stuck for over two weeks before being freed from the sand. The ship was so damaged that she had to return to port and enter dry dock for repairs.

After the battleship was freed, a naval court of inquiry found Captain William D. Brown and a handful of other naval officers guilty of negligence. Brown was moved down 250 places on the promotion list, effectively ending his naval career.

Missouri was repaired and reentered service with the active fleet shortly afterward. She would go on to serve in the Korean War before being decommissioned in 1954. She entered the Puget Sound Reserve Fleet in Bremerton, Washington, where she remained until being reactivated in 1984 as part of the 600-ship Navy plan put forth by then President Ronald Reagan and his Navy Secretary John Lehman.

== Background ==
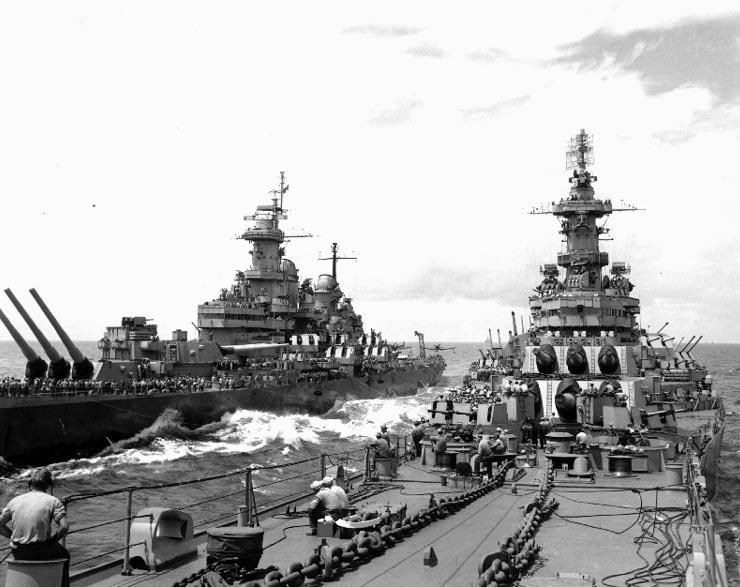
Missouri (at left) transferring personnel to Iowa, while operating off Japan on 20 August 1945.

Missouri was one of the Iowa-class "fast battleship" designs planned in 1938 by the Preliminary Design Branch at the Bureau of Construction and Repair. She was laid down at the Brooklyn Navy Yard on 6 January 1941, launched on 29 January 1944 and commissioned on 11 June. The ship was the third of the Iowa class, but the fourth and final Iowa-class ship commissioned by the United States Navy. The ship was christened at her launching by Mary Margaret Truman, daughter of Harry S. Truman, then a United States senator from Missouri.

Missouri was active in the Pacific Theatre of World War II, escorting the Fast Carrier Task Forces and shelling beachheads for Allied Army and Marine Corps personnel involved in amphibious operations against the Imperial Japanese forces. After the atomic bombings of Hiroshima and Nagasaki the Empire of Japan capitulated to Allied demands, signing the instrument of surrender to the allied powers aboard Missouri on 2 September 1945.

Between 1945 and 1950 the US fleet of battleships had been entirely decommissioned; however, Missouri was spared this fate due to the influence of now-President Truman, who refused to allow the battleship to be decommissioned, and against the advice of Secretary of Defense Louis Johnson, Secretary of the Navy John L. Sullivan, and Chief of Naval Operations Louis E. Denfeld, Truman ordered Missouri to be maintained with the active fleet partly because of his fondness for the battleship and partly because the battleship had been christened by his daughter. As a result, Missouri was involved in various training and flag waving exercises at home and abroad between World War II and the Korean War.

== Events leading to the accident ==
In October 1949, amid increasing political scrutiny, (Note: Although Missouri had fought against the Japanese in the Pacific Theatre of World War II she was rendered obsolete by the aircraft carrier, and this obsolescence extended past her time in World War II and into the Cold War with the rise of long-range bombers which could carry nuclear ordnance and ICBMs. When combined with the ongoing military drawdown of the armed services and the merger of the formerly independent Department of the Navy and Department of War into the newly created Department of Defense in accordance with the National Security Act of 1947 the Navy came under increasing attacks for being unneeded in an age when it was believed that the Army and Air Force could do the same jobs as the Marine Corps and Navy. This hostile disagreement between the services branches erupted into a war of words in 1949 when then Secretary of Defense Louis A. Johnson canceled USS United States, the first of the so called "supercarriers"; fallout from this incident ultimately compelled the United States Congress to hold hearings on the matter.) Missouri arrived at the Norfolk Naval Shipyard for three months of scheduled maintenance. During this period Captain Harold Page Smith was relieved by Captain William D. Brown. A graduate of Annapolis and veteran of 30 years, Captain Brown had amassed a distinguished record commanding submarines and destroyers, but had never commanded a ship the size of Missouri, and had not been to sea in a command capacity since World War II. Captain Brown formally assumed command of Missouri on 10 December, just ahead of the completion of maintenance work on the battleship. On 23 December, Brown took the battleship out for a brief trip around the Virginia Capes and returned to Norfolk on Christmas Eve. Her next scheduled departure was 17 January, at which time Missouri was to sail to Guantánamo Bay for maneuvers.

On 13 January, Brown received a request from the Naval Ordnance Laboratory for the Missouri to proceed through a channel in which the United States Navy had strewn acoustic cables as part of an ongoing project that aimed to identify ships by their propeller signatures. The request was entirely optional, but as the captain was preoccupied with the details of the upcoming sortie to Cuba he gave the letter little attention and instead referred the matter to his operations officer, Commander John R. Millett, who in turn referred the letter to the ship's navigator, Lieutenant Commander Frank G. Morris.

On 14 January, Captain Brown and his operations and navigating officers met to discuss the upcoming cruise to Cuba and the details surrounding this cruise, and also talk briefly about the acoustical test they were to run. The ship was to pass between two orange-and-white-striped buoys that marked the entrance and exit from the range. The range itself was located precariously close to the "danger bearing"—the shoal area in which the safe 50 to 60 feet (15 to 18 m) of water that could accommodate a ship shoaled to only 10 to 20 feet (3 to 6 m). To make matters worse, the range through which Missouri was to pass had originally been marked with five buoys, but this number had been reduced to two buoys two days prior to the arrival of Captain Brown. Morris was aware that three of the five buoys had been removed from the range, but had not received authorization to delete the non-existent buoys from the chart. Although informed of this during the conference, Captain Brown and Commander Millett left the conference under the mistaken belief that there were still five buoys marking the acoustical range.

== Grounding ==
At 7:25 am 17 January 1950 Missouri set sail for the Atlantic Ocean with harbor pilot R. B. McCoy at the helm. Because of the better view afforded on the forward mast structure, the battleship was sailed through the Chesapeake Bay from the eighth level of the battleship's forward mast structure. At the time she had a full complement of ammunition and water, and her fuel tanks were 95% full, which brought Missouri's total displacement to 57,000 tons; she drew 35 feet 9 inches (10.90 m) at her bow and 36 feet 9 inches (11.20 m) at her stern. At 7:49 am, near the Elizabeth River Channel Buoy 3, the pilot turned control of the battleship over to Captain Brown and departed for shore. The weather was clear and Missouri was now free to run through the acoustic channel. Missouri sailed toward two red markers that Commander George Peckham believed marked the shoal water in the channel.

With the departure of R. B. McCoy, Captain Brown assumed full command of Missouri. He ordered the battleship engines brought to two-thirds speed and ordered a course set for 053 on the recommendation of navigator, Lieutenant Commander Morris.

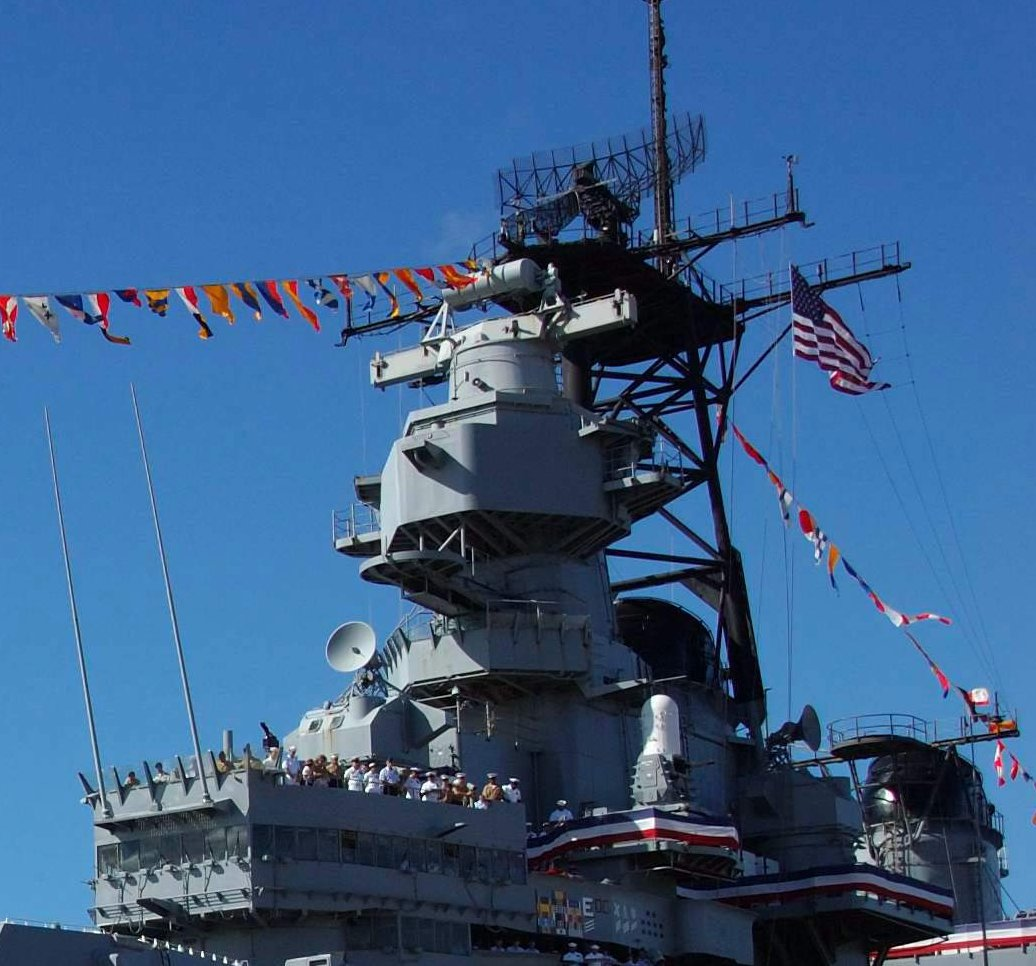
The tower aboard Missouri from which Captain Brown conned the battleship during the grounding accident. This was taken after Missouri's 1986 recommissioning, as is evidenced by the 20 mm Phalanx CIWS gun located just to the right of the bridge.

At 8:05 am, as Missouri sailed past Fort Wool, Captain Brown turned control of the ship (known in naval terms as the "conn" of the ship) over to the officer of the deck and departed for the chart house. His arrival at the chart house caused Ensign E. R. Harris, who had been tracking the battleship's course on the chart, to move away from the table, resulting in the interruption of the plot. Around the same time Captain Brown informed Commander Peckham that Missouri would soon run an acoustical range. This was the first time that the executive officer had heard about a planned acoustical range run.

Approximately two minutes after departing for the chart room, Captain Brown reemerged on the open bridge and reassumed the conn of the battleship. He summoned Lieutenants Hatfield and Arnold, Missouri's morning and forenoon officers of the watch, respectively, and informed them of the planned run through the acoustical range. As with Commander Peckham, this was the first time that either of these two men had heard anything about the planned acoustical test run. When Captain Brown noted their confused looks, he promptly informed the men to "Go get yourselves informed", at which point both officers reported to the chart room on level eight. There they learned of the impending run through the acoustical range by looking at the chart with the buoys marking the range; despite this, both remained confused over aspects of the planned run.

At 8:10 am Captain Brown ordered a course change to 060 degrees and informed the men that the conn for the battleship would remain on the eighth-level bridge until they cleared the course. This was unusual for Missouri, as the conn was usually shifted to the fourth-level bridge during the transit at the point when a ship passed Fort Wool and Old Point Comfort. The initial course change to 060 was altered to 058 as a result of a strong ocean current that swung Missouri too far to the right during the course correction.

It was at this point that the first indication that something was dangerously amiss during the transit occurred. The executive officer, who passed through the chart room while preparing for the shift change, noticed that Missouri was rapidly approaching the shoal water, and promptly told Morris "For God's sake watch it!" At the same time a discussion occurred on the eighth-level bridge as to whether it would be advisable for the battleship's speed to be increased to 15 knots. Morris and Millet differed in opinion on the idea; the former felt speed should be reduced 5 knots, and the latter felt that any steady speed held during the transition would be okay. Captain Brown therefore decided to increase speed to 15 knots, and the engine room replied by increasing power.

Around the same time, Lieutenant Arnold located a small buoy with orange-and-white stripes 1,000 yards (910 m) away. Initially this buoy was identified as one of the acoustical range markers as a result of the letter "B" painted on it, but this information was not properly relayed to the rest of the crew. Mistakenly believing that this was the marker for the right side of the range, both Captain Brown and the battleship's operations officer agreed to order the battleship to pass to the left of the marker. By then Missouri was sailing for the danger line marking the separation between the deep water of the channel into the shallow water of the shoals. This was made apparent when a pair of spar buoys marking the entrance to a shallow fishing channel appeared ahead of Missouri. Brown incorrectly identified these markers as the end of the acoustical range, but several of the quartermasters, as well as Commander Peckham, Lieutenant Arnold, and other officers knew this was an incorrect assumption. It was at this point the first recommendation to turn right was made by Morris, the navigator; Brown declined because of his mistaken belief that the markers for the fish channel were actually the end of the acoustical range. A similar recommendation from Commander Peckham also went unheeded.

Around the same time in Missouri's Combat Information Center (CIC) crew members manning the battleship's navigational radar system noticed that the radar returns indicated that Missouri was steaming for dangerous waters; however, the CIC crew did not report this information to the captain. Lieutenant John Carr, the officer on duty in the CIC at the time of the grounding, concluded that the radar equipment was likely not operating correctly. Carr later explained the decision not to report the radar information by stating, "the standard practice on board ship did not call for radar advice to the bridge in the absence of specific requests." He also pointed out that the fathometer, a water depth-reading instrument, was out of order and had not been repaired in the yard.

At 8:15 am Missouri crossed the danger bearing into the shoal water. At this time Commander Peckham sent a message to Captain Brown stating "Ship heading into Danger shoals. Recommend you come right immediately!", but this message was relayed by "talkers" (men charged with relaying messages for officers to different stations) and the talker who was supposed to pass Peckham's message to Brown had a tendency to mumble badly. At the same time Peckham was attempting to alert Brown of the impending grounding, Morris again approached Brown and recommended coming right to avoid the shoal water. Captain Brown did not recall being informed of this, and made no reply to Morris. At this point Morris took a bearing on Thimble Shoals, and alarmed at the impending grounding Morris frantically returned to the captain waving his arms and shouting "Come right! There's shoal water ahead!" A disbelieving Captain Brown dismissed Morris' pleas by stating that it was his belief that the navigator did not know where they were. To verify Morris' claims of impending shoal water, Brown asked Commander Millet to check Morris's position. As a precautionary move, Brown then ordered Quartermaster Travis, Missouri's helmsman, to alter course to 058, but this order came too late.

At 8:17 am, Missouri slid up on a shoal (or mud bar) and stuck to the ground. In a last-ditch effort to prevent the grounding, Peckham sent a message to Brown stating "Come right immediately! Twist ship!", (Note: This order, if followed, would have resulted in the battleship making a hard right turn, while the engine room would have reversed the starboard engines and set the port engines to full, which would have aided Missouri by bringing her full engine power into the turn as well. (Newell, p. 77)) but this effort was too little, too late; Missouri had already run aground. Her hull had traveled approximately 2,500 feet (760 m), which was very nearly the entire length of the shoal, raising the battleship several feet out of the water, and her engines were shut down after the bay sand began to clog the battleship's intakes in engineering. (Note: This swift response from the engineers aboard Missouri in the aftermath of the grounding earned the engineers commendations for their quick reaction. Had the engines not been shut down so swiftly, more serious damage to the battleship may have occurred; as it was, the loss of the engines eliminated the electrical power aboard the ship and caused the emergency diesel generators to switch on. The generators were unable to operate long though, owing to the presence of sand in the condensers. (Stillwell, p. 150)) She had come to rest on an almost even keel on the sandbar within plain sight of "Admirals Row", the historic homes along Dillingham Boulevard at Naval Station Norfolk occupied by 18 flag officers of the United States Navy stationed at Hampton Roads, and the homes of a similar number of high-ranking officers of the United States Army stationed at Fort Monroe.

== Salvage ==
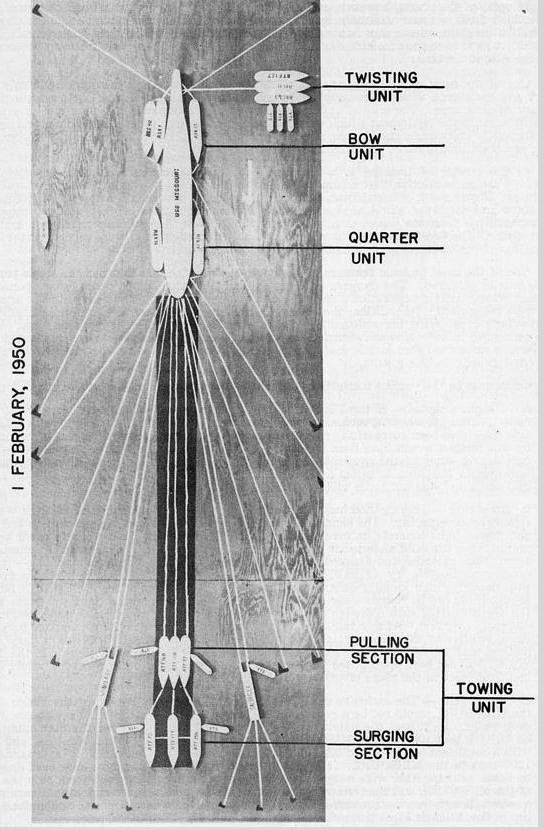
Configuration for final successful pull

By 8:30 am a request went out summoning all available tugs to the site of the grounding with the hope that they would be able to free the ship before any further damage occurred. An attempt made by Missouri's sailors on the day of the grounding met with failure, as did an initial attempt to pull Missouri back into deep water with sixteen tugboats. Before the tugs could lend any further assistance, the naval brass postponed the attempt, pending the outcome of further assessment. Missouri had traversed the shoal nearly 2,500 feet, and to compound her problem she had run aground during an unusually high tide. To add insult to injury, she had become the butt of a number of bad jokes among the American public, the Navy's rival service branches, and the Soviet Navy, which were quick to pounce upon the dreadnought's grounding as material for the naval publication Red Fleet.

Initially, high-ranking US Navy officials elected to contract a private salvage firm to free the battleship, but Admiral Allan E. Smith, at the time Commander, Cruisers, Atlantic, and the man who was responsible for issuing Missouri's orders disagreed with this plan. He reasoned that if the Navy got her on to the shoal, then they should be responsible for getting her off the shoal. Ultimately, he won his case for a US Navy salvage effort, but he was explicitly informed by officials at The Pentagon that his career would ride on his ability to successfully get Missouri back into deep water. To better organize the salvage effort, Smith and a number of men on his staff moved aboard Missouri to supervise her return to deep water. Smith's supervision also extended to answering the nearly 10,000 letters sent to the Navy from concerned citizens offering advice on how to get the battleship back into deep water.

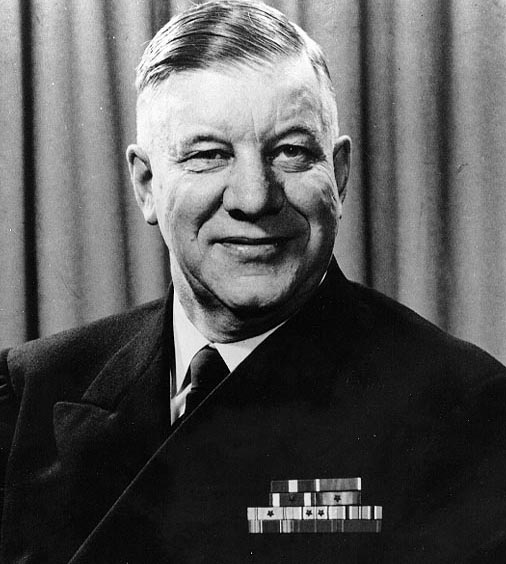
Admiral Wallin, seen here c. 1951–1953, was singled out for command of the Missouri salvage operation

Commanding this salvage effort was Rear Admiral Homer N. Wallin. Wallin was the Navy Yard Commandant at Norfolk, and as a captain he had been instrumental in repairing damage at Pearl Harbor after the 7 December 1941 air raid by the Imperial Japanese Navy that had brought the United States into World War II. In total the salvage team that Wallin commanded successfully resurrected 19 of the 21 ships initially declared total losses and helped to refit those ships to serve in the Second World War. Wallin initiated a five-point plan aimed at getting Missouri off the mud and back into the water:

- Remove as much weight as possible from the battleship,
- Lift the ship, (Note: This would later be accomplished with the use of pontoons. (Stillwell, p. 153))
- Remove as much sand as possible from around the battleship,
- Use the combined power of the area's tugboats to pull the battleship,
- Dredge the channel to provide deep water for Missouri to reenter the shipping lanes.

It would be later concluded that if Missouri had to go aground her locale was perfect; she had grounded in protected waters and in an area abundant with salvage equipment.

Because the grounding had occurred during an unusually high tide, a roughly comparable tide would be required to free her, projected for 2 February. With time as a factor, Wallin took charge of the operation and put his plan into motion. With the assistance of Admiral Smith, Wallin was able to assemble a large salvage force which included submarine rescue ships, special salvage ships, divers, and pontoons to give Missouri additional buoyancy when the time came for the tugs to move her.

On 19 January, Comber, an army dredge, arrived at the site of the Missouri grounding and began to clear Missouri's intended path. On 22 January, Comber was joined by the civilian-run dredge Washington in the dredging phase of Wallin's plan. Around this time Missouri's crew began offloading all non-essential items. Both 16-inch (406 mm) and 5-inch (127 mm) shells, powder, food, drink, and other materials were removed from the battleship and placed aboard barges. At the same time, the Cimarron-class fleet oilers Chemung and Pawcatuck began offloading Missouri's fuel. As the fuel was required to operate the generators aboard Missouri, its absence resulted in a shift from supplying the power Missouri required with her own generators to relying on the submarine rescue ships for power and water.

Originally, the weight-reduction phase had included removing the anchors from the battleship, but Wallin ordered one to be reattached to help shift Missouri's center of gravity forward to a narrower part of the battleship, thereby reducing the friction at her widest point. During this time, the Bureau of Ships offered valuable technical and salvage advice to both the civilian and military participants in the salvage effort.

On 31 January, an attempt was made to free Missouri with the assembled collection of tug boats and salvage ships. It was thwarted by an anchor from a previous wreck that had become embedded in Missouri's hull. The extreme force generated by the tugs caused several two-inch wire rope cables to break, and the failed attempt also revealed that Missouri needed to lose more weight. Changes included cutting the anchors and chains off the battleship—after they had been re-added at Wallin's request—and the inclusion of additional pontoons. A second attempt was tentatively scheduled for 1 February.

== Freeing ==
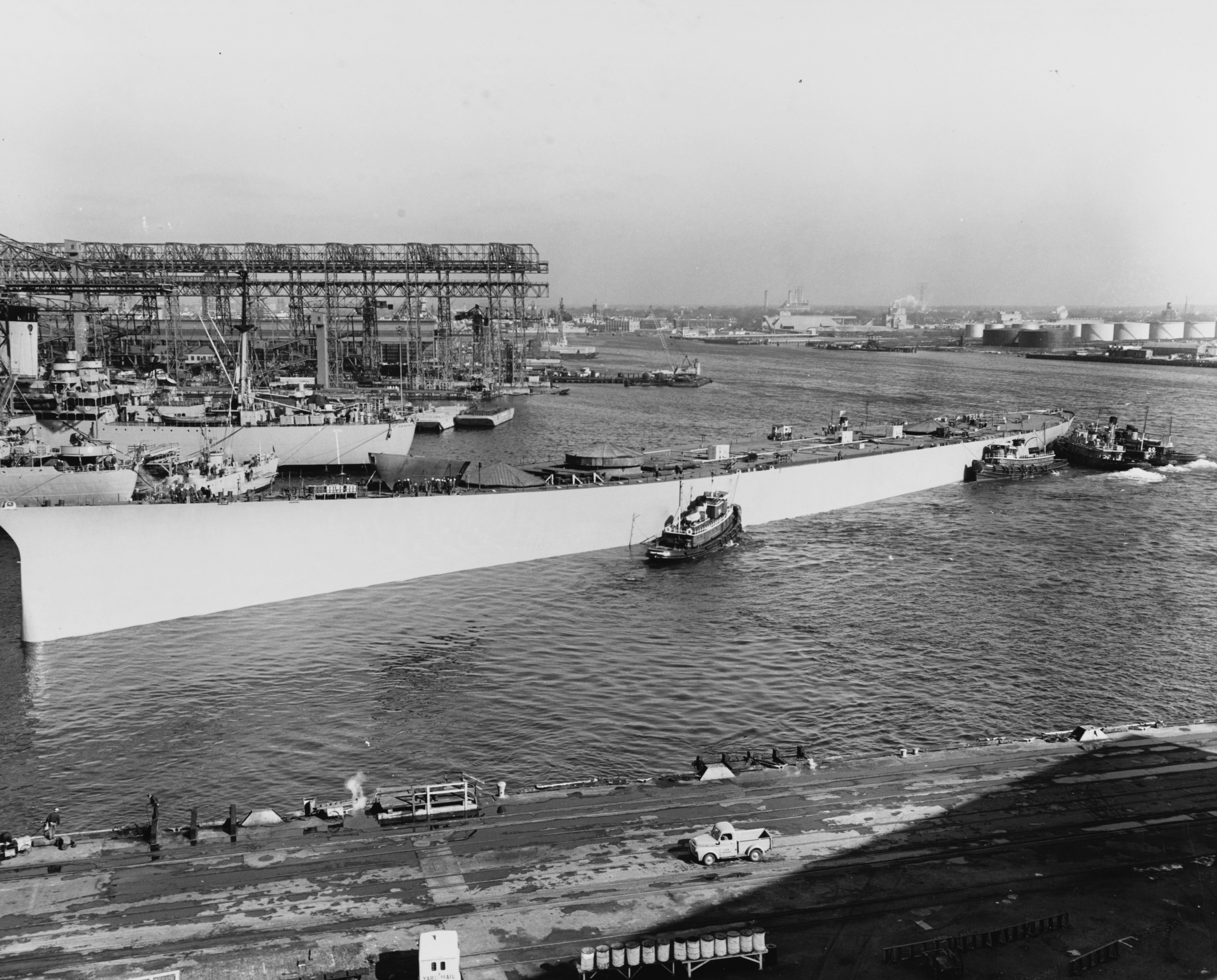
The hull of the incomplete battleship Kentucky is floated out of drydock to allow Missouri to enter drydock for repairs

On 1 February Missouri was finally freed with the assistance of 23 vessels. Five tug boats pulled alongside, six pulled astern, and three swung to the bow to facilitate movement. Additionally, two Gypsy-class salvage vessels, Salvager and Windlass, and seven yard tugs helped keep the other vessels in place. Kedge anchors were also used to expedite the process. About the time that Missouri began to move again, she suffered one last incident: while being towed off the shoal, she bumped into Windlass, wiping out a portion of Windlass's side railing. However, the damage was insignificant, and as the battleship slowly returned to the harbor, the band played "Missouri Waltz", "Anchors Aweigh", and "Nobody Knows the Trouble I've Seen". Crewmen also hoisted battle flags and hoisted signal flags which read "Reporting for Duty". A Norfolk harbor pilot was responsible for issuing the engine and rudder orders to the battleship, while Missouri's own navigator issued course orders for the battleship during the tow.

With an audience observing the process, Missouri finally returned to the deep water at 7:09 am. Following her liberation from the muddy shoal, Missouri was towed back to the naval yard where her incomplete sister ship Kentucky had been removed from dry dock to allow Missouri to undergo repairs, which—apart from structural inspection—included replacement of some of her double-bottom plating that had buckled and ruptured three fuel tanks.

== Aftermath ==
Captain Brown was court-martialed as a result of the incident, pleaded guilty, and was relieved of command of Missouri. As a result of his plea, he suffered the loss of 250 places on the list of captains awaiting ships. He spent the rest of his active duty time on shore duty. Four others were court-martialed; two were cleared of all charges, one received a letter of reprimand, and one was reduced on the promotion list.

Missouri was repaired and returned to fleet. She stayed in commission throughout the Korean War, and—after the cease-fire agreement—was decommissioned into the United States Navy reserve fleets, where she remained until the 1980s. Despite proof to the contrary, rumors continued to circulate that Missouri suffered permanent damage as a result of the grounding incident.

Thereafter, the ship was sometimes referred to as the "Muddy Mo," a takeoff on "Mighty Mo".

== Bibliography ==
- Bonner, Kit; Bonner, Carolyn (1998). "Collision & Grounding: USS Missouri BB-63". Great Naval Disasters: U.S. Naval Accidents in the 20th Century. Osceola, Wisconsin: MBI Publishing Company. pp. 24–33. ISBN 0-7603-0594-3.
- Newell, Gordon; Smith, Allan E. (1969). "USS Missouri Has Gone Half a Mile Inland". Mighty Mo: The USS Missouri: A Biography of the Last Battleship. Seattle, Washington: Superior Publishing Company. pp. 69–79. Library of Congress Catalogue Card Number 7287802.
- Newell, Gordon; Smith, Allen E. (1969). "How Do You Move the RCA Building?". Mighty Mo: The USS Missouri: A Biography of the Last Battleship. Seattle, Washington: Superior Publishing Company. pp. 80–106. Library of Congress Catalogue Card Number 7287802.
- Newell, Gordon; Smith, Allan E. (1969). "The Enemy Positions Are Pulverized". Mighty Mo: The USS Missouri: A Biography of the Last Battleship. Seattle, Washington: Superior Publishing Company. p. 106. Library of Congress Catalogue Card Number 7287802.
- Stillwell, Paul (1996). "Aground". Battleship Missouri: An Illustrated History. Annapolis, Maryland: Naval Institute Press. pp. 145–164. ISBN 1-55750-780-5.
