= USS Camden (AOE-2) =

Sacramento-class fast combat support ship

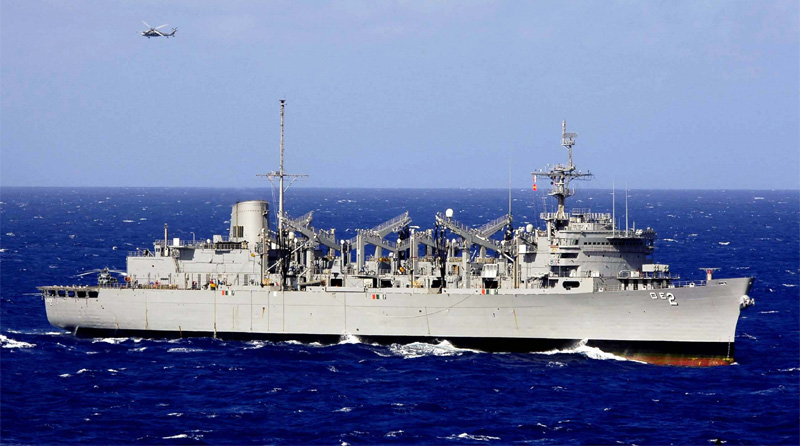
- USS Camden (AOE-2)

History

United States
- Name: USS Camden
- Namesake: Camden, New Jersey
- Awarded: 25 April 1963
- Builder: New York Shipbuilding
- Cost: Approx. $458 million
- Laid down: 17 February 1964
- Launched: 29 May 1965
- Acquired: 11 March 1967
- Commissioned: 1 April 1967
- Decommissioned: 14 October 2005
- Stricken: 14 October 2005
- Home port: Bremerton, Washington
- Identification: 05833
- Motto: Flexibility, Readiness, Endurance
- Nickname(s): The Powerful Pachyderm of the Pacific
- Honors and awards: Navy Unit Commendation x 4; Navy Meritorious Unit Commendation x 3; Navy Battle "E" Ribbon x 3; Navy Expeditionary Medal-Iran Indian Ocean x 3; Navy Expeditionary Medal-Persian Gulf x 2; National Defense Service Medal; Armed Forces Expeditionary Medal x 9; Vietnam Service Medal x 7; Southwest Asia Service Medal; Republic of Vietnam Campaign Medal
- Fate: Scrapped 2008

General characteristics
- Class & type: Sacramento-class fast combat support ship
- Displacement: 20,717 long tons (21,049 t) light; 53,138 long tons (53,991 t) full
- Length: 796 ft (243 m)
- Beam: 107 ft (33 m)
- Draft: 38 ft (12 m)
- Propulsion: 4 × 600 psi (4,100 kPa) at 856 °F (458 °C) V2M boilers; 2 × steam turbines; 2 × shafts; 2 × 23 ft (7.0 m) propellers; 100,000 shp (75 MW)
- Speed: 30 knots (56 km/h; 35 mph)
- Boats & landing craft carried: 2 × 26 ft (7.9 m) Motor Whale Boats; 2 × 33 ft (10 m) Personnel Boats
- Capacity: Fuel oil: 5,200,000 US gal (20,000,000 L); Aviation fuel (JP-5): 2,700,000 US gal (10,000,000 L); Dry/refrigerated stores: 675 t (675,000 kg); Ordnance: 3,000 t (3,000,000 kg)
- Complement: 27 officers, 587 enlisted
- Armament: 2 × 20 mm Phalanx CIWS Mark 15 guns; 1 × 8 cell NATO Sea Sparrow Mark 29 missile launcher; Super Rapid Blooming Off-Board Chaff (SRBOC) system
- Aircraft carried: 2 × CH-46 Sea Knight later switched to 2 x SH-60 Seahawk helicopters in 2004

USS Camden (AOE-2) was a Sacramento-class fast combat support ship, the second ship of the United States Navy named after the city of Camden, New Jersey. It combined the functions of three logistic support ships in one hull - fleet oiler (AO), ammunition ship (AE), and refrigerated stores ship (AF).

== History ==
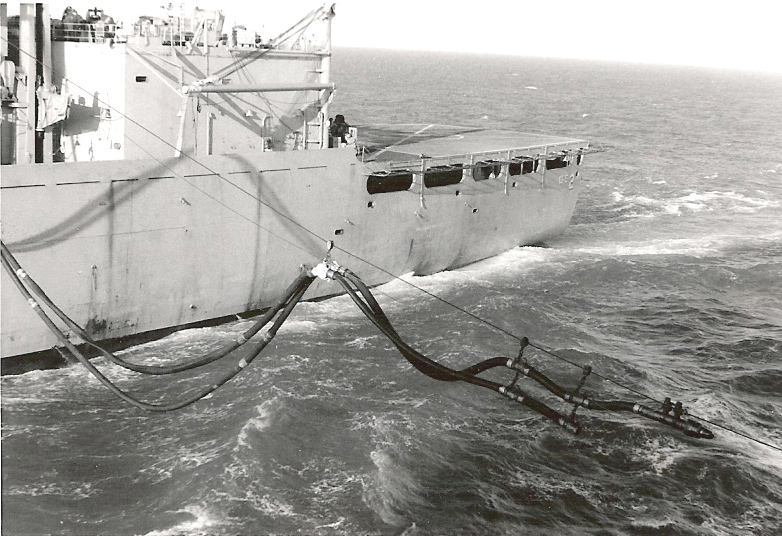
USS Camden refueling USS Chicago during the Vietnam War.

Camden was keeled on 17 February 1964, launched on 29 May 1965, and commissioned on 1 April 1967 as the second of four vessels in its class. It was the 542nd and final contract in the 68-year history of New York Shipbuilding, and the last vessel completed and launched at the shipyard. It was assigned to the Pacific Fleet in September 1967 and was initially homeported in Long Beach, California. On 26 November 1968 Camden suffered minor damages from a collision with the aircraft carrier USS Hancock. For their accomplishments during her first deployment to WestPac in 1968–1969, her crew was awarded the Meritorious Unit Commendation.

In August 1974, Camden moved to its new homeport at Naval Base Kitsap in Bremerton, Washington. The ship operated extensively up and down the West Coast of the United States and deployed frequently to the Western Pacific and Indian Oceans to support units of the Seventh Fleet. In 1980, Camden moved again to Bremerton for an overhaul.

On 20 July 1983 The New York Times reported that Camden, along with seven other vessels in the Ranger Carrier Battle Group, left San Diego on 15 July 1983 and were headed for the western Pacific when they were rerouted and ordered to steam for Central America to conduct training and flight operations in areas off the coasts of Nicaragua, El Salvador, and Honduras as part of major military exercises planned for that summer. The battle group comprised the carrier Ranger, the cruiser Horne, the guided missile destroyer Lynde McCormick, the destroyers Fletcher and Fife, the frigate Marvin Shields, the oiler Wichita and Camden.

On 17 May 1987 Camden was redirected to assist the damaged USS Stark after it was attacked by unfriendly fire. Camden's job was to unload all of the weapons on board Stark in case of further attack.

In 1991, Camden was deployed to resupply the aircraft carrier USS Nimitz and support ships, which were returning to the U.S. from duty in the Persian Gulf after taking part in Operation Desert Storm. On 15 August 1991, four airmen from the Helicopter Combat Support Squadron 11 based on Camden were reported missing and presumed dead after their Sea Knight helicopter crashed while resupplying ships in the around 100 miles (160 km) east Wake Island. Two ships were close by when the aircraft dropped into the water, and two helicopters were immediately launched for an air search. The ships in the area also launched whaleboats to assist in the search, which was ultimately unsuccessful. In 1992, CURV-III recovered the wreckage of the helicopter from a depth of 17,251 feet (5,258 m), setting the world record for deepest salvage at the time.

Following the repeal of the Combat Exclusion Law in 1993, Camden was one of the first US Navy ships to host female servicemembers, specifically two helicopter pilots including Captain Tracy Barkheimer.

In March 1996, Camden was awarded its third consecutive Battle "E" for demonstrating excellence in all warfare and mission categories.

In October 2000, Camden participated in Operation Determined Response, providing rescue assistance and hospitality services in support of USS Cole in the Yemeni port of Aden after the Cole was damaged in a terrorist attack.

In 2004, Camden won the Battle "E" again. This was the final year of Battle "E" eligibility for the Sacramento-class fast combat support ship.

In January 2005, Camden left on its final deployment, an eight-month world tour with USS Carl Vinson escorting that carrier to its new homeport in Norfolk, Virginia. Camden was decommissioned 14 October 2005 on Pier Delta at Naval Base Kitsap, Bremerton, Washington, and was disposed of by scrapping at Esco Marine, in Brownsville, Texas by 13 May 2008.

== Power plant ==
Camden's power plant was one of two built for the Iowa-class battleship USS Kentucky, which was cancelled in 1947 when 72.1 percent complete. The other Kentucky power plant was used to power USS Sacramento, the lead ship of her class.
