= Sacramento, Costa Rica =

Coordinates: 10°06′N 84°08′W

Sacramento de Heredia
- Village
- Nickname: Sacramento
- Motto: Welcome to Sacramento
- Interactive map of Sacramento de Heredia
- Province: Heredia
- Canton: Barva
- Established: Sometime in the 1920s (Finca de los Sanchez)

Government
  - Type: none

Area
  - Total: 20.0 km^{2} (7.7 sq mi)
  - Land: 18.0 km^{2} (6.9 sq mi)
  - Water: 2.0 km^{2} (0.77 sq mi) %5%
- Elevation: 2,200 m (7,200 ft)

Population (2010)
  - Total: 200 approx.
  - Density: 3.5/km^{2} (9.1/sq mi)
- Time zone: UTC-8 (Pacific (PST))
  - Summer (DST): UTC-7 (PDT)
- Postal code: none
- Area codes: 2, 5

Sacramento de Heredia is a small town in the district of San Jose de la Montana, Barva, Heredia, Costa Rica. It is home to the Braulio Carrillo National Park and the Bar y Restaurante Sacramento and is a popular tourist location. No census is available due to the fact there is no structured organization in the town, and the fact the population changes frequently, but approximates estimate at 200.

== Economy ==
Sacramento's economy is largely based around the sole commercial entity, and popular weekend spot, the Bar Sacramento. From there, tourists often visit the Braulio Carrillo National Park up the road. Most of the populace is self-employed in the agricultural business.
