= Sacramento City =

Sacramento City refers to any one of several things that represents the city of Sacramento:

- Sacramento City College
- Sacramento City Council
- Sacramento City Hall
- Sacramento City Library
- Sacramento City Unified School District

== See also ==
- Sac City (disambiguation)
