= Sacramento (disambiguation) =

Sacramento is the capital city of the U.S. state of California.

Sacramento may also refer to:

== Places ==
=== Brazil ===
- Sacramento, Minas Gerais

=== Costa Rica ===
- Sacramento, Costa Rica

=== Mexico ===
- Sacramento, Coahuila
- Sacramento River (Mexico)

=== Portugal ===
- Sacramento (Lisbon), a Portuguese parish

=== United States ===
- Sacramento County, California
- Sacramento, Kentucky
- Sacramento, Nebraska
- Sacramento, New Mexico
- Sacramento, Pennsylvania
- Sacramento, Wisconsin
- Sacramento River, California
- Sacramento Valley, California

=== Uruguay ===
- Colonia del Sacramento

== Other ==
- Sacramento (film), a 2024 film
- Sacramento (magazine), a lifestyle magazine based in Sacramento, California
- "Sacramento" (song), by Deep Dish, 2005
- "Sacramento" (A Wonderful Town), a song by Middle of the Road, 1971
- Dylan Sacramento (born 1995), Canadian soccer player
- USS Sacramento, three ships of the United States Navy
- "Sacramento", a song by Cherry Ghost from their 2014 album Herd Runners
- SS Asbury Park, vessel formerly known as the SS City of Sacramento

== See also ==
- Sacramento Kings, a professional basketball team based in Sacramento, California
- Sacramento City (disambiguation)
