= USS Seattle (AOE-3) =

Sacramento-class fast combat support ship

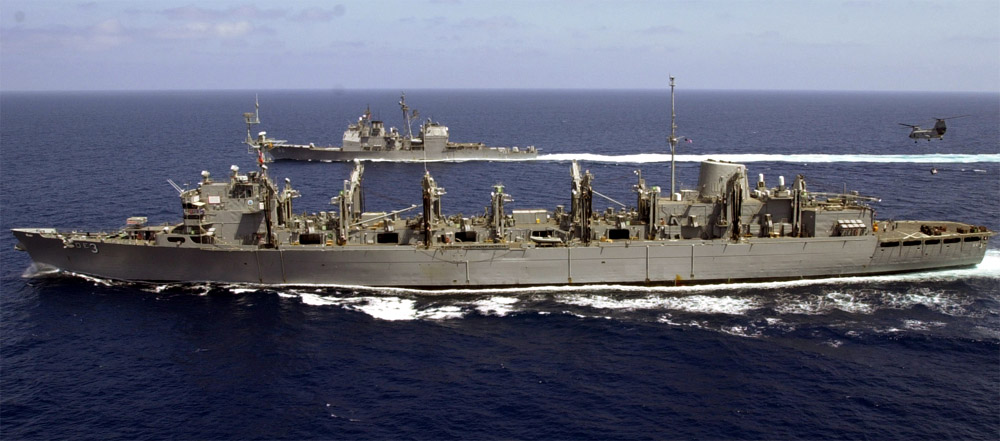
- USS Seattle (AOE-3)

History

United States
- Name: USS Seattle
- Namesake: Seattle, Washington
- Laid down: 1 October 1965
- Launched: 1 March 1968
- Commissioned: 5 April 1969
- Decommissioned: 15 March 2005
- Stricken: 15 March 2005
- Motto: "Beans, Bullets & Oil"
- Fate: Scrapped at ESCO Marine, Brownsville, TX. Scrapping complete 26 January 2007

General characteristics
- Class & type: Sacramento-class fast combat support ship
- Displacement: 18,884 long tons (19,187 t) light; 54,000 long tons (54,867 t) full
- Length: 796 ft (243 m)
- Beam: 107 ft (33 m)
- Draft: 38 ft (12 m)
- Propulsion: 2 × steam turbines, 2 × shafts, 100,000 shp (75 MW)
- Speed: 30 knots (56 km/h; 35 mph)+
- Capacity: Fuel Oil: 5.2 m gal (19.7 m L); Aviation fuel (JP-5): 2.7 m gal (10.2 m L)
- Complement: 34 officers and 602 enlisted
- Armament: 2 × 20 mm Phalanx CIWS Mark 15 guns; 1 × 8 cell NATO Sea Sparrow Mark 29 missile launcher; 1 × 25 mm automatic cannon; 4 × 0.5 in (12.7 mm) machine guns
- Aircraft carried: 2 × CH-46A/D Sea Knight helicopters

The second USS Seattle (AOE-3), a Sacramento-class fast combat support ship, was laid down on 1 October 1965, at the Puget Sound Naval Shipyard, Bremerton, Washington; launched on 2 March 1968; sponsored by Mrs. William M. Allen, chairman of the board of the Children's Orthopedic Hospital Association, Seattle; and commissioned on 5 April 1969.

After fitting out, Seattle departed Puget Sound Naval Shipyard on 24 September 1969, en route to Norfolk. Seattle visited Long Beach, San Diego, Acapulco, the Panama Canal, and New Orleans, arriving at Norfolk, her designated home port, on 22 November.

== 1970 ==
Seattle left home port on 2 January 1970, for Guantanamo Bay and shakedown training. On 13 January, Seattle took attack carrier, America, alongside for refueling. She departed again on 19 January for more exercises and a visit to Port-au-Prince, Haiti, before returning to Guantanamo on 26 January.

Following additional exercises and battle problems, Seattle steamed for Mayport, Florida, and thence proceeded to Norfolk, arriving on 12 February.

On 26 February, Seattle was struck by a yard tug, puncturing a tank, and spilling black oil for almost two hours. The oil was quickly skimmed off the water, and no adverse reaction resulted from the mishap.

Seattle departed Norfolk on 27 August for her first overseas deployment. She entered her first European port, Lisbon, Portugal, on 6 September. On 8 September, she anchored off Rota, Spain. Passing through the Straits of Gibraltar the next day, Seattle loaded cargo onto Concord and then proceeded to the eastern Mediterranean Sea via Augusta, Sicily. The Jordanian Crisis had brought matters close to a boil, and Seattle served as the primary logistic support ship for Saratoga and her escorts. Toward the end of the month, Seattle was one of 12 ships reviewed by the president Richard Nixon.

Seattle continued her support of Saratoga in the eastern Mediterranean until 20 October, when she arrived in Athens, Greece.

Leaving Athens on 29 October, Seattle replenished ships until 9 November, when she pulled into Augusta, Sicily, for another one-day fuel lift. She then proceeded to Taranto, the Italian Navy's largest base, arriving on 12 November.

Seattle departed Taranto on 16 November and continued replenishment of 6th Fleet ships. She spent from 25 November to 1 December in Naples. From 8 to 14 December, she was anchored in Barcelona, Spain; and ended the year at Villefranche, France.

== 1971 ==
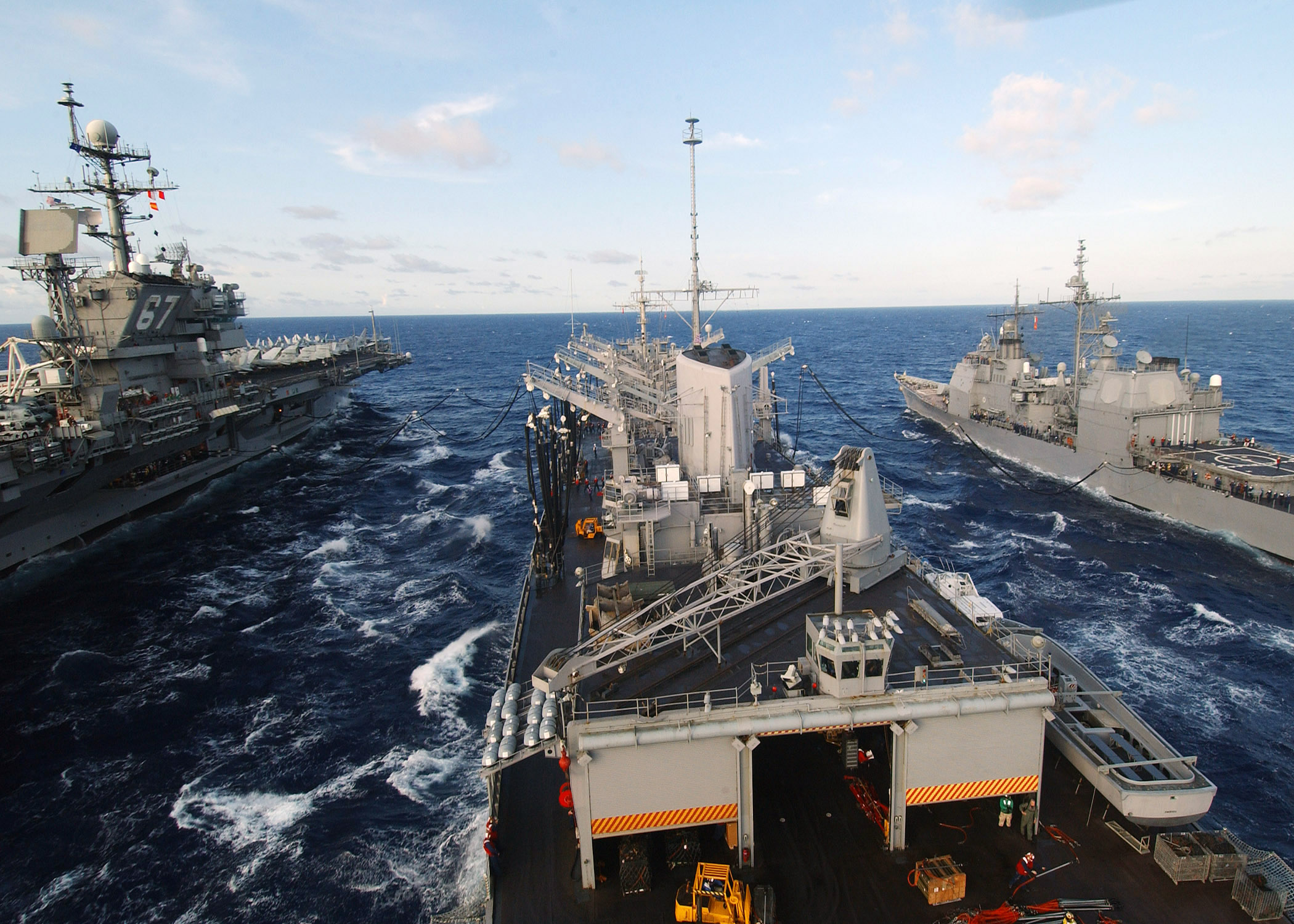
USS Seattle conducting dual underway replenishment

Seattle got underway on 6 January 1971, for operations in the vicinity of southeast Sicily. On 17 January, she anchored in Naples, remaining there until 22 January. She operated in the Ionian Sea, the Algiers-Provencal Basin, and off Barcelona until 20 February, when she got underway for operations en route to Norfolk, arriving on 1 March.

On 10 August, Seattle departed for Puerto Rico, arriving at Roosevelt Roads on 13 August. She operated around Puerto Rico, the Virgin Islands, Guantanamo, and Haiti before returning to Norfolk on 11 October.

On 1 December, Seattle steamed out of Craney Island, Virginia, for a six-month deployment to the Mediterranean. The fast combat support ship arrived at Rota, Spain, on 9 December, and got underway on the following day for Augusta, Sicily, arriving on 16 December. On 19 December, she was en route to Naples, where she spent Christmas in port. On 28 December, Seattle ended her stay in Naples and was underway to Barcelona, arriving on New Year's Eve. At the completion of a seven-month Mediterranean cruise, Seattle returned to Norfolk on 29 June 1972. She operated out of Norfolk for four months, then departed, on 24 October, for an unscheduled deployment to the U.S. 6th Fleet. She participated in "Bystander" operations in the western Mediterranean and in exercise "National Week XIV" before returning to Norfolk on 19 December.

== 1972–73 ==
Seattle spent the remainder of 1972 at Norfolk and the first six months of 1973 in operations from that port. In June, she began another voyage to the "middle sea." This tour of duty lasted until December, with Seattle arriving in Norfolk on 1 December. Missing is the history 1973 of the USS Seattle AOE-3 in helping resupply the Aircraft Carriers used to resupply the aircraft being flown to Israel. "Stepping Stones" The AOE-3 would steam at a high speed of 27 knots to resupply the US Navy Carrier Groups in the Western Mediterranean Sea, the middle, and Eastern groups. Frequently the Russians would get in the way requiring us to change course, however, one day, the Russian was in the way and he had to move quickly seeing the black smoke coming from our stack. After refueling and rearming the 3 different groups, we would sail to Augusta Bay, Sicily and be refuelled by one of the old slow US Navy Tankers and the 27 knots to the West, Central and East to resupply the Carriers again. We repeated this round-robin refuel and rearm for several hours as the planes flying in from Lajes could not make it all the way to Israel. "Stepping Stones" During the 1973 Arab-Israeli war, Washington used the Lajes airbase as a stepping stone in mounting an arms airlift to Israel. Lisbon then was hit by the Arab oil embargo.

== 1990-1999 ==
On the first 48 hrs. after the assault on Kuwait by Iraqi forces under Saddam Hussein, the Seattle received immediate orders to be deployed from its new Homeport recently changed from Naval Station Norfolk to Naval Weapons Station Earle, New Jersey to incorporate and provide support with the fleets sent underway at first to exert military pressure to political negotiations but later, when the government of Saddam entrenched, to provide continued cover during Operation Desert Shield. During the course of operations, the Seattle would take a crucial and important part, while no substantial bases and ports existed yet in the Persian Gulf, in the earlier and later actions in the buildup to the Operation Desert Storm during the conflict of the First Persian Gulf War from the first weeks of August to the end of April next year, after the successful retaking of Kuwait and surrender of Iraq. Under its new captain, Wilbur Trafton, Vietnam veteran Naval Pilot, the Seattle was assigned an extra wing of Air crews and helicopters to provide faster and continued air cargo supply, around the clock, besides its main operations of replenishment while at sea to multiple ships on its starboard and port sides even while underway at fast speed. Most of the main ammunition and other supplies for the Kennedy and Saratoga Carriers task Force to provide Air cover on the assault to liberate Kuwait and pressure on Iraq itself done by these two American carrier battle groups and supply of Allies countries vessels was done from this AOE ship. During the 7 1/2-month period of its active duty back and forth in the Persian Gulf and Red Sea theatre of operations, the Seattle was mostly well covered by the defense systems of the carriers and battle groups, but on two separate occasions Iraqi Forces spotted the vessel and tried to strike it with Scud missiles while away replenishing itself in allied ports (Jeddah, Saudi Arabia & Haifa, Israel), in order to hinder the fleets main source of provisions and thus, their continued presence and air raids on them. Returning to New Jersey and later a period of extensive repairs at the Philadelphia Naval Shipyards.

== Last years ==
Seattle accompanied the John F. Kennedy carrier battle group on deployment to the Persian Gulf in June 2004. On 12 August 2004, Seattle rescued twelve crew of the Indonesian flagged cargo ship Edha II – delivering the survivors to Umm Qasr Port, Iraq. On 14 December 2004, she returned to Norfolk.

Seattle decommissioned on 15 March 2005.

As of March 2013 the captain's gig of Seattle resides at Nauticus in Norfolk, VA on display at the pier's end.
