= Sacramento-class fast combat support ship =

Class of United States Navy logistics ships

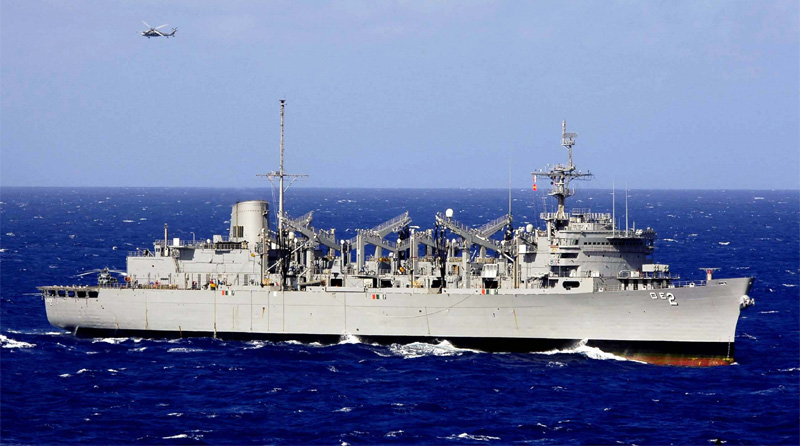
- USS Camden (AOE-2)

Class overview
- Name: Sacramento
- Builders: Puget Sound Naval Shipyard, New York Shipbuilding
- Operators: United States Navy
- Preceded by: N/A
- Succeeded by: Supply class
- In commission: 1964–2005
- Completed: 4
- Retired: 4

General characteristics
- Type: Fast combat support ship
- Displacement: 53,000 long tons (54,000 t)
- Length: 795 ft (242 m) (overall)
- Beam: 107 ft (33 m) (extreme)
- Draft: 39 ft (12 m)
- Installed power: 100,000 shp (75,000 kW)
- Propulsion: 4 boilers producing 600 psi (4,100 kPa) at 856 °F (458 °C); super-heated steam driving 2 × turbines, producing 100,000 hp (75,000 kW) at 4,829 rpm
- Speed: 26 knots (48 km/h; 30 mph)
- Capacity: 177,000 US bbl (5,600,000 US gal) fuel, 2150 tons ammunition, 500 tons dry stores, 250 tons refrigerated stores.
- Complement: 24 officers, 576 enlisted
- Sensors & processing systems: Mark 56 fire-control system
- Armament: NATO Sea Sparrow missiles; 2 × Phalanx close-in weapons systems
- Aircraft carried: CH-46E Sea Knight

The Sacramento-class fast combat support ships were a class of four United States Navy supply ships used to refuel, rearm, and restock ships in the United States Navy in both the Atlantic and Pacific Oceans.

== History ==
The idea of combining the capabilities of a fleet oiler (AO), ammunition ship (AE), and refrigerated stores ship (AF) had been conceived during the Second World War by Admiral Arleigh Burke, later Chief of Naval Operations, who sought to create a single ship that would perform the functions of three vessels while simultaneously integrating into a carrier battle group. This was deemed necessary because World War II replenishments had to be scheduled well in advance due to communications problems and were subject to change due to weather or combat related reasons. On top of that the Underway Replenishment Groups of that time were slow and unwieldy.

After experimenting with this "replenishment oiler" concept with the German war prize Dithmarschen (placed in service as USS Conecuh (AOR-110)), the US Navy's solution to these problems was to create a multi-product station ship, which resulted in the construction of the Sacramento class. The Sacramentos had been designed to carry more fuel and ammunition than the largest ammunition ships then in service with the US Navy. The AOEs were also designed to be much faster than previous auxiliaries at 26 knots, giving them the ability to operate in company with a carrier battle group rather than in a separate, slower replenishment group. The first two ships each received one-half of the powerplants removed from the unfinished Iowa-class battleship Kentucky, while the remaining two received new construction machinery. All four had General Electric turbines.

To fulfill the same role in the less demanding Anti-Submarine Support Aircraft Carrier (CVS) groups, the navy built the similar, but smaller and slower, Wichita-class AORs.

Construction of the unnamed AOE-5 was cancelled in 1968. There are no Sacramento-class ships in service with the Navy, the last one being retired in 2005.

The ships that now fulfill this role for the U.S. Navy are the Supply-class fast combat support ships. Those ships are not commissioned ships of the Navy; rather they are operated by the Military Sealift Command.

== Ships ==
Ship name	Hull no.	Builder	Laid down	Launched	Commissioned	Decommissioned	Fate	NVR Page
USS Sacramento	AOE-1	Puget Sound Naval Shipyard	30 June 1961	14 September 1963	14 March 1964	1 October 2004	Struck 1 October 2004, Sold for scrap	AOE1
USS Camden	AOE-2	New York Shipbuilding	17 February 1964	29 May 1965	1 April 1967	14 October 2005	Struck 14 October 2005, Sold for scrap	AOE2
USS Seattle	AOE-3	Puget Sound Naval Shipyard	1 October 1965	1 March 1968	5 April 1969	15 March 2005	Struck 15 March 2005, Sold for scrap	AOE3
USS Detroit	AOE-4	Puget Sound Naval Shipyard	29 November 1966	21 June 1969	28 March 1970	17 February 2005	Struck 2 February 2005, Sold for scrap	AOE4
