= USS Detroit (AOE-4) =

Sacramento-class fast combat support ship

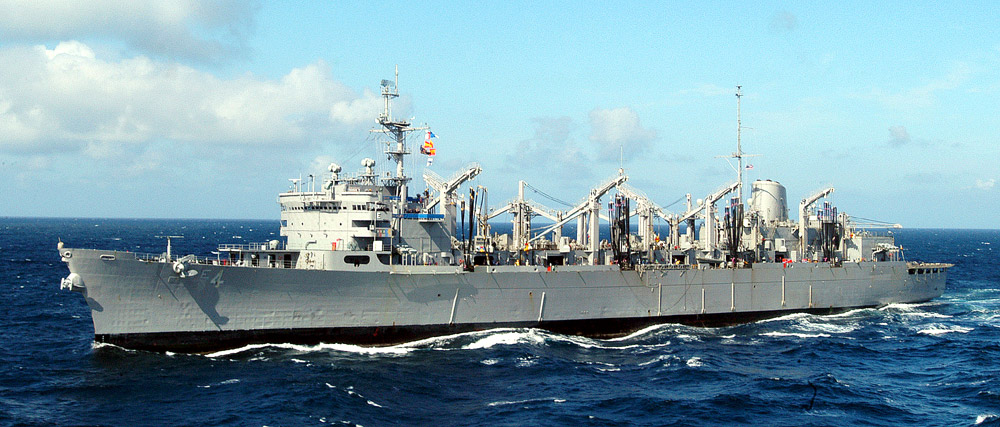
- USS Detroit (AOE-4)

History

United States
- Name: USS Detroit
- Namesake: Detroit, Michigan
- Ordered: 29 December 1965
- Builder: Puget Sound Naval Shipyard, Bremerton, Washington
- Laid down: 29 November 1966
- Launched: 21 June 1969
- Commissioned: 28 March 1970
- Decommissioned: 17 February 2005
- Motto: Superare Optimum; ("To Surpass the Finest")
- Fate: Scrapped at ESCO Marine, Brownsville, TX. Scrapping complete November 3, 2006

General characteristics
- Class & type: Sacramento-class fast combat support ship
- Displacement: 18,884 long tons (19,187 t) light; 57,000 long tons (57,915 t) full
- Length: 796 ft (243 m)
- Beam: 107 ft (33 m)
- Draft: 38 ft (12 m)
- Propulsion: 4 × steam boilers, 600 psi; 2 × steam turbines; 2 × shafts; 100,000 shp (75 MW)
- Speed: 34 knots (63 km/h; 39 mph)
- Complement: 34 officers and 602 enlisted
- Armament: 2 × 20 mm Phalanx CIWS Mark 15 guns; 1 × 8 cell NATO Sea Sparrow Mark 29 missile launcher
- Aircraft carried: Two CH-46E Sea Knight or MH-60S Seahawk helicopters

USS Detroit (AOE-4) was the fourth and last Sacramento-class fast combat support ship built for the United States Navy. She was laid down on 29 November 1966 by Puget Sound Naval Shipyard, Bremerton, Washington; launched 21 June 1969; and commissioned on 28 March 1970. She is the fifth United States Navy ship named after Detroit, Michigan, the largest city in the state of Michigan, and the river of the same name.

Detroit served for 35 years operating primarily with the U.S. 6th Fleet in the Mediterranean Sea and Persian Gulf regions.

== Service history ==
=== 1970–1980 ===
After her initial shakedown cruise, Detroit departed Bremerton for her first operational home port, Newport, Rhode Island, rounding the horn of South America en route. In March 1971, she was involved in a minor collision with a US Navy oiler off the coast of South Carolina. Shortly thereafter, Detroit deployed for six months of extended operations with the 6th Fleet, returning to Newport in December 1971. In April 1972 the Detroit escorted USS Saratoga CV-60 to the southern tip of Africa on her way to support the war in Vietnam. Detroit refueled Saratoga then returned to home port. Detroit made her second deployment with 6th Fleet to the Mediterranean on 1 December 1972, returning to Newport in July of the following year. On 12 December 1973, while the ship was undergoing repairs and upkeep in Newport, Detroit suffered an explosion in her after engine room exhaust stack which caused extensive material damage.

A shore establishment realignment led to Detroit's home port shift to Norfolk, Virginia in January 1974. Detroit sailed from Norfolk 14 July 1974, en route to her third Mediterranean deployment in support of 6th Fleet operations. In addition to her normal taskings, she participated in contingency operations related to the Cyprus crisis, completing this task in December 1974 before returning to Norfolk.

Detroit sailed for her fourth Mediterranean deployment on 19 August 1975 and completed over 200 replenishments before returning to Norfolk on 28 January 1976.

On 13 July 1976, Detroit sailed north to commence her first shipyard overhaul at Bath Iron Works in Maine. The NATO Sea Sparrow missile system and new communications capabilities were added prior to her return to Norfolk in July 1977. Detroit sailed from Norfolk on her fifth Mediterranean deployment on 4 April 1978, returning on 26 October 1978. She and her CH-46 helicopter detachment from Helicopter Combat Support Squadron Six (HC-6) conducted 232 underway and vertical replenishments during this deployment, serving in a Task Group led by USS Forrestal(CV-59). After another five-month Mediterranean deployment in 1979, Detroit returned to Norfolk for a short six-month turn-around in preparation for her seventh Mediterranean deployment, commencing on 14 July 1980. A Suez Canal transit followed National Week exercises, and the new routine became the support of U.S. 7th Fleet’s Indian Ocean Battle Group operating in the vicinity of the Persian Gulf. Returning through the Suez, Detroit proceeded to service 6th Fleet units prior to visiting Lisbon, Portugal, in late November. Detroit returned to Norfolk on 11 December 1980.

=== 1981–1989 ===
On 10 June 1981 Detroit ran aground when she veered from the dredged channel and ran aground in shallow water in Hampton Roads while the ship was entering port. She was refloated four days later after fuel and weapons were removed. There was no apparent damage to ship or injuries to the crew, but the commanding officer was relieved of command for the incident. Detroit departed Norfolk on 25 June 1981 for her eighth Mediterranean deployment. She serviced 6th Fleet and NATO units and participated in the missile exercises in the Gulf of Sidra, when two Libyan aircraft were shot down by F-14 Tomcats from USS Nimitz (CVN-68). Detroit returned to Norfolk on 8 November 1981.

In January 1982, Detroit began her second shipyard overhaul at Norfolk Shipbuilding and Dry Dock Company’s Berkeley Yard in Chesapeake, Virginia. The focus of this overhaul was on the engineering plant and the crew’s living quarters. Her defensive capability was also upgraded by the addition of two 20 mm Phalanx CIWS Mark 15 guns. Detroit left the yard in January 1983.

On 20 October 1983, Detroit departed for deployment with the 6th Fleet. While in the Mediterranean, Detroit was the principal combat logistics force ship supporting U.S. and Allied units of the Multi-National Peacekeeping Force, in Beirut, Lebanon. Throughout the height of the crisis, Detroit provided logistical support to two carrier battle groups, the New Jersey battle group and the deployed Marine Amphibious Ready Group. On 9 January 1984 Detroit suffered a fuel fire in her forced-draft blower while moored at Souda Bay, Crete. Some crew members were treated for smoke inhalation. When she returned to Norfolk on 2 May 1984, Detroit had completed 301 replenishments, a new ship’s record.

In February 1985, Detroit completed an extensive three-month repair availability. From July through October 1985, she participated in fleet exercises in the Caribbean Sea, as well as in "Ocean Safari 85" operating above the Arctic Circle in Norway's Vestfjord. During these operations, Detroit encountered a severe storm consisting of extreme cold and heavy seas. As a result, Detroit suffered the loss of a large section of main deck railing, several deck fixtures and the ship’s solid brass bell. Detroit put in for repairs in Dunoon, Scotland before continuing operations. In August 1985, Detroit successfully completed the first Operational Propulsion Plant Examination given to an AOE by the Commander-in-Chief, Atlantic Fleet (CINCLANTFLT) Propulsion Examination Board.

In March 1986, Detroit departed Norfolk for her tenth deployment with the 6th Fleet in the Mediterranean. She supported three carrier operations off the coast of Libya in March and April 1986. In September 1986, she returned to Norfolk. Beginning in the fall of 1986 the Detroit was once again sent in for an overhaul following her deployment. Starting in Virginia at Norfolk shipbuilding, she went through what was supposed to be a rapid turn around, with primary work on her engines. Following the departure, with numerous delays, she headed for Guantanamo Bay, Cuba for exercises and crew training. While there she suffered a major malfunction to her engines that would hamper her from 1987 - 1990. She was sent to Philadelphia for more work on her engines that lasted from 1987 -1988. Upon her return to Norfolk, she suffered a fatality in her engine room with a sailor being scalded with live steam. The summer of 1988 found Detroit back in the European theater, participating in Exercise Teamwork 88 replenishing U.S. and NATO allies in the Norwegian fjords.

After officially changing homeports in October 1989, Detroit was underway in support of law enforcement operations in the Caribbean Sea.

=== 1990–1999 ===
In May 1990, Detroit arrived at Naval Weapons Station Earle, Leonardo, New Jersey where she was homeported until decommissioning in 2005.

In August 1990, Detroit deployed to the Mediterranean for the 11th time since commissioning, but was diverted to the Red Sea in response to Iraq's invasion of Kuwait. She remained on station in the Red Sea through the remainder of the year.

On 17 January 1991, Operation Desert Storm commenced with Detroit as one of two fast combat support ships on station. Detroit's crew worked non-stop for the remaining three months of what ultimately became a nine-month deployment. Detroit commenced a six-month dry docked phased maintenance availability in May 1991 at Philadelphia Naval Shipyard.

In May 1992, Detroit returned to 6th Fleet in support of MED 2-92. This deployment proved to be remarkably successful for Detroit and her crew. Detroit participated in the insertion and retrieval of United States Army and Navy Special Forces during the Exercise Ellipse Bravo, and rescue efforts to the TCG Muavenet, a Turkish warship, after it was struck by a missile from the USS Saratoga.

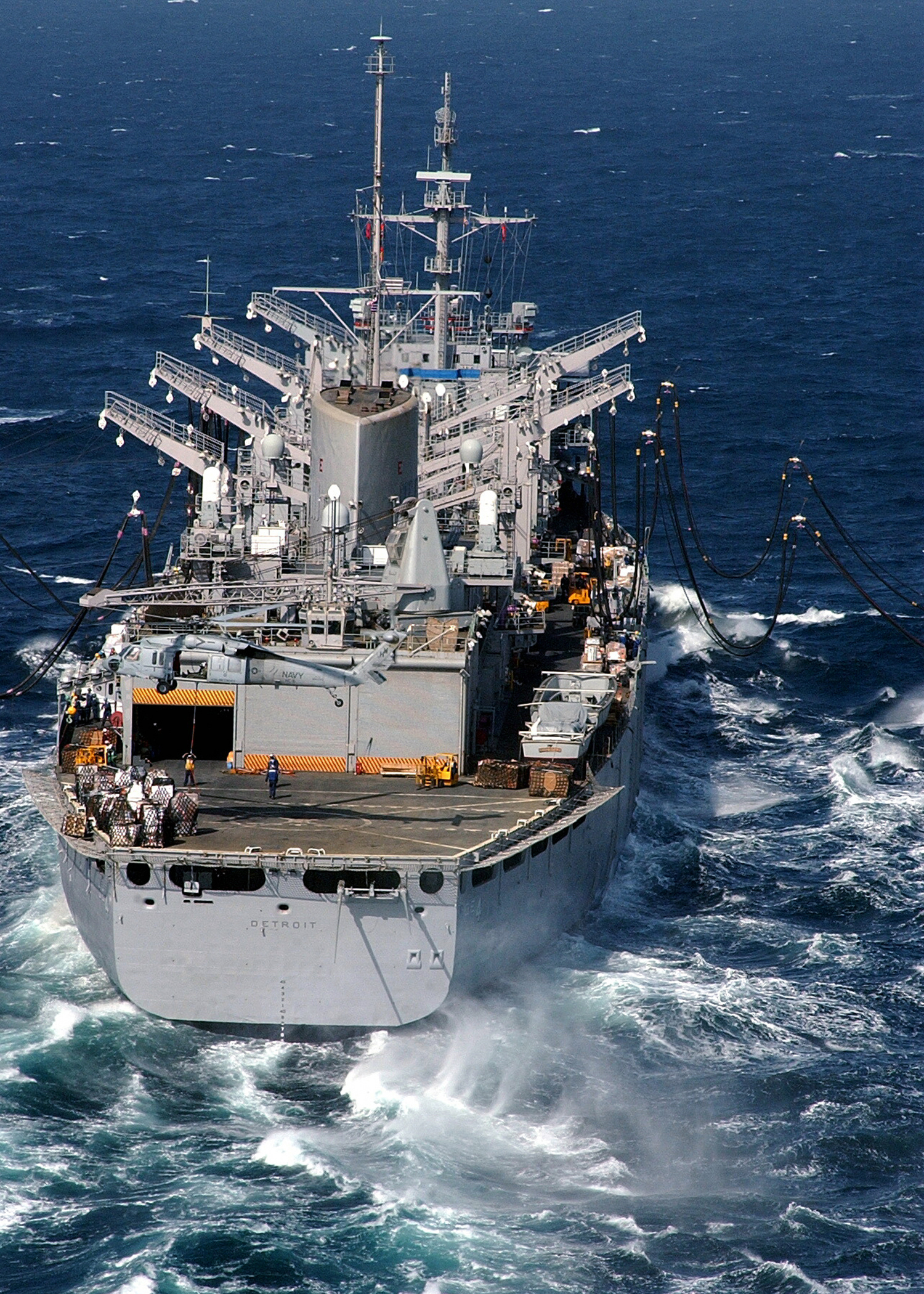
USS Detroit during a dual underway replenishment

Detroit returned to Philadelphia Naval Shipyard for a dry docked phased maintenance availability in July 1993. Shipyard repairs were completed in January 1994 and the ship immediately commenced work-ups for her next deployment.

On 20 October 1994, Detroit was underway for her 13th Mediterranean deployment. Prior to arriving in the Mediterranean, the ship was tasked to take station in the Arabian Sea in support of U.S. Naval Forces. Detroit returned to the 6th Fleet in December 1994. She remained in the Mediterranean and Adriatic Seas, providing logistics support for the remainder of the deployment.

On 22 November 1996, Detroit deployed with the Theodore Roosevelt battle group for her 14th Mediterranean deployment. Detroit performed operations in the Adriatic Sea, as well as transiting the Suez Canal, joining the U.S. 5th Fleet in support of Operation Southern Watch. Additionally, she participated in exercise "Inspired Siren 2-97" and a variety of other multi-national exercises. Detroit returned to Earle, New Jersey on 22 May 1997. She was awarded a Navy Unit Commendation during this deployment.

From July through November 1997, Detroit underwent a four-month phased maintenance availability, which extended the life of her propulsion plant at least another ten years. Detroit earned the Commander, Naval Surface Force, U.S. Atlantic Fleet 1997 Battle Efficiency Award and the 1997 Chief of Naval Operations Ship-Helo Safety Award.

Upon completion of the basic phase of training in preparation for her next deployment in support of the Enterprise battle group Detroit then known as the "Dirty D" deployed for her 15th Mediterranean/Persian Gulf Deployment in November 1998. Responding to a national crisis, she sped her way from Earle, New Jersey to the Persian Gulf to complete the fastest transit in combat logistics force history. Detroit was key in Operation Desert Fox by providing ammunition, combat stores, fresh fruits and vegetables, and fuel to battle group units participating in the operation. On Thanksgiving Day, Detroit had the pleasure of hosting the Chief of Naval Operations for a brief visit while in port at Jebel Ali. During the deployment, Detroit was notified that she was awarded four individual "E’s" for excellence during 1998 in supply and logistics, mission area excellence, engineering and damage control, and operations and communications - a clean sweep in all mission areas. In May 1999, Detroit returned to her homeport.

On 8 November 1999, Detroit began a four-month docking phased availability at Philadelphia Naval Shipyard.

=== 2000–2005 ===
On 27 August 2000, Detroit was involved in a collision with USS Nicholson (DD-982) approximately 100 miles off the Virginia Capes. Damage to both ships was minor.

Detroit deployed with the Enterprise battle group to the Persian Gulf 2 October 2003 and returned to her homeport 1 March 2004. The USS Detroit was proclaimed as the Grand Champion of Fleet Week 2004 in New York City, New York on May 30, 2004. The Culinary Competition was held on board the USS Intrepid at the Sea, Air and Space Museum – Technology Hall. On Memorial Day, 2004, NBC Studios invited the, “Fighting Tiger,” for a - first ever in history - worldwide showing on television during the TODAY Show. The hosts were Ms. Anne Curry and Ms. Katie Couric. TEAM MEMBERS for USS DETROIT (AOE-4), CAPTAIN – CS1 (SW) Nimely, SOUS - CS2 (SW) Augustin, MAITRE’ DI - CS3 (SW) McAloon, TOURNANT - MM3 Davis, CREW – PCSN Stanbery, Mrs. Stanbery and EXECUTIVE CHEF – CSCS (SW/SS) Mongiello. Executive Chef JUDGES from Manhattan restaurants Craig Agans & William Gallagher of Becco, Salvatore Calisi of Osteria Stella, Cesare Casella of Beppe, Silverio Chavez of Bice, Junnajet Hurapan of Hue, Reginald Leveque of Mirelles, Giancarlo Quadalti of Celeste and Bianca, Claude Solliard of Seppis and Cyrille Wendling of L’Avenue. SPECIAL Judges were Michael Stern – President and CEO of the Fisher Center, Ralph Slane – V.P. of the NY Navy League, RADM Jeffrey Cassias of COMSUBGRU 10 and Colonel Thomas Cariker of SPAMGTF-10.

Detroit was decommissioned on 17 February 2005. She was towed by USNS Apache to the inactive ships maintenance facility at Philadelphia, Pennsylvania.

Detroit was brought to Port of Brownsville, Texas for final disposal in October 2005. The remains of the ship were sent to a scrap heap in Mexico.

== Ship's crest ==
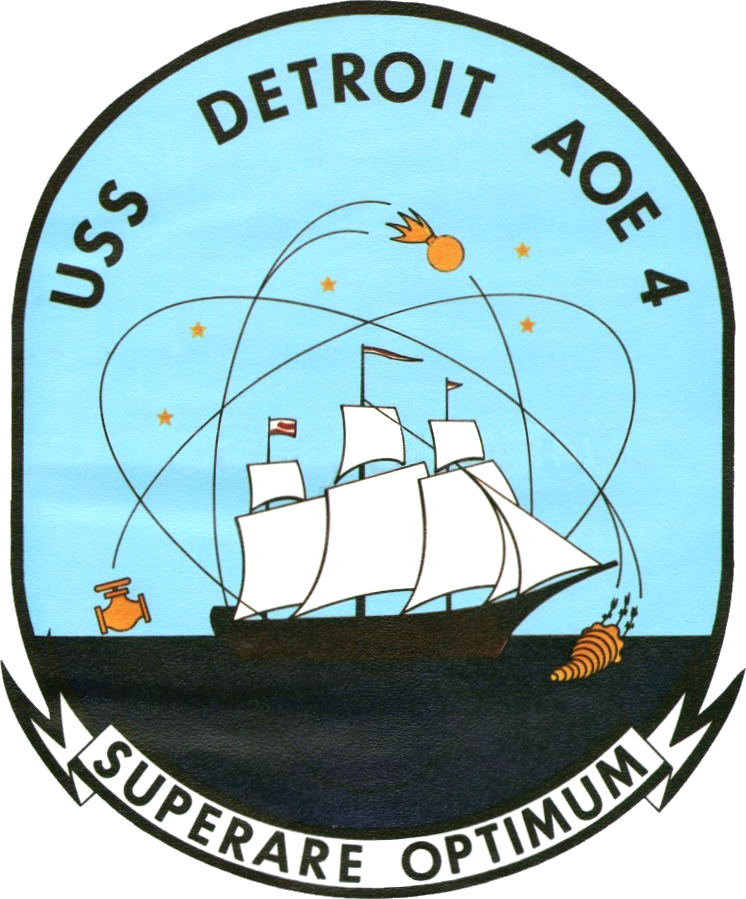
Crest of Detroit

Detroit's emblem was constructed by a member of the ship's pre-commissioning crew. This was the rationale:

1. A profile of the first Detroit
2. A flaming mine to symbolize ordnance
3. A wheat-filled cornucopia to symbolize provisions
4. A fuel valve to symbolize petroleum products
5. Electron paths to symbolize the nuclear era
6. Five stars to represent the five ships named Detroit named in honor of the City of Detroit, Michigan
7. The ship's motto, Superare Optimum; "To Surpass the Finest."

The first Detroit was a 19-gun sloop captured from the British in the Battle of Lake Erie during the War of 1812. Her black hull and white sails are set against a background of light blue sky and deep blue sea. The symbols for ordnance, provisions, and petroleum products are set along the electron paths that symbolize the modern nuclear age. These symbols reflect the mission of the fast combat support ship: to support naval forces at sea in the theater of operations.

== Awards ==
Detroit was awarded the following awards during her career:

- 3 × Navy Unit Commendations
- 2 × Meritorious Unit Commendations
- 3 × Navy "E" Ribbons
- 2 × Navy Expeditionary Medals
- 3 x National Defense Service Medals
- 7 × Armed Forces Expeditionary Medals
- 3 × Southwest Asia Service Medals
- 1 × Kosovo Campaign Medal
- 2 × Armed Forces Service Medals
- Sea Service Deployment Ribbon (multiple)
- 1 × NATO Medal
- 1 × Secretary of the Navy Letter of Commendation
- 1 × Chief of Naval Operations Ship-Helo Safety Award
