= Chinese ship Chaganhu =

Type 901 combat support ship

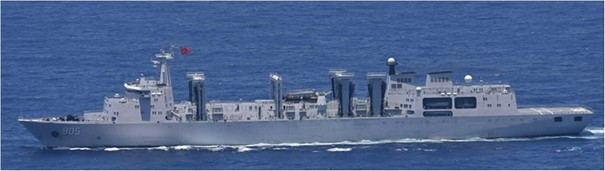
- Chaganhu underway on 9 June 2025

History

China
- Name: Chaganhu; (查干湖)
- Namesake: Chagan Lake
- Builder: Huangpu Shipyard, Guangzhou
- Launched: June 2017
- Commissioned: 12 February 2019
- Identification: Pennant number: 905
- Status: Active

General characteristics
- Class & type: Type 901 fast combat support ship
- Displacement: 45,000 tons
- Length: 240 m (787 ft 5 in)
- Beam: 31 m (101 ft 8 in)
- Draft: 10.8m
- Propulsion: 4 × QC280 gas turbines; Total output: 112 MW (150,000 hp)
- Speed: 25 kn (46 km/h; 29 mph)
- Sensors & processing systems: Type 347 radar, ZGJ-1B electro-optical system, and ZFJ-1A fire control system
- Armament: 4 x 30 mm H/PJ-13, helicopter pad

Chaganhu (905) is a Type 901 fast combat support ship of the People's Liberation Army Navy.

== Development and design ==
The Type 901 integrated supply ships are the latest generation of super large ocean-going integrated supply ship (fast combat support ship) of the Chinese People's Liberation Army Navy. Compared with the earlier Type 903 integrated supply ship, its replenishment equipment has been greatly improved and improved in performance, which can provide the future Chinese aircraft carrier fleet with replenishment tasks under more complex conditions. Since the top speed of this class of supply ship reaches 25 knots, it will be able to flexibly deploy with the aircraft carrier fleet.

The Type 901 is estimated to have a 45,000 ton displacement and a beam of 31.5 metres. The ship is powered by four QC280 gas turbines, each delivering 28 MW, for maximum speed of about 25 kt; the speed is necessary to keep up with carriers. The Type 901 is more than twice the size of the preceding Type 903A and significantly faster.

The Type 901 appears to be designed with similar missions to the Supply-class fast combat support ship which is to keep large surface action groups supplied.

== Construction and career ==
She was launched in June 2017 at Huangpu Shipyard in Guangzhou and commissioned on 12 February 2019 into the South Sea Fleet.

In late January 2023, the PLAN far sea joint training formation, consisting of the landing helicopter dock Hainan, the Type 052D destroyer Hohhot, the guided missile frigate Liuzhou and the fast combat support ship Chaganhu, set sail from Zhanjiang, Guangdong to conduct an extended ("far sea") training cruise in the South China Sea, the Western Pacific and other waters. The cruise lasted a total of 30 days and covered more than 9,000 nautical miles. This was the first time that Hainan was reported publicly as conducting a "far sea" training cruise.
