= List of ships named Camden =

Several ships have been named Camden:

- Camden, of 300 tons (bm), was launched at Liverpool in 1760 under another name. She first appeared in Lloyd's Register (LR) as Camden in 1776, after having been named Mary and James, and immediately before that Montego Bay. Between 1780 and 1784 she made two voyages as a slave ship in the triangular trade in enslaved people. She had embarked 1,232 captives and she arrived in the West Indies with 1,119, for a 9% mortality rate. Then between 1784 and 1786 she made one voyage as a whaler in the British southern whale fishery. She then became the Greenland whaler Leviathan, in the British northern whale fishery. Between 1786 and 1793 Leviathan made eight annual whaling voyages; damages in 1791 cost her that season. In 1794 she became a West Indiaman, and then a transport. Towards the end of 1796 a French privateer captured her.
- Camden, of 48 tons (bm), was built in 1794 at Cork. She made one voyage as a sealer and was lost on the coast of Patagonia in March 1826.
- Camden (1799 ship) was a merchant ship built upon the River Thames. She made two voyages transporting convicts from England to Australia. She was wrecked in 1836.
- Camden (1813 ship) was built at Whitby and served as a general trader for much of her career, though in 1820-21 she made one voyage to Bombay for the British East India Company (EIC). Between 1833 and 1837 she was a Greenland whaler out of the Whitby whale fishery. She was last listed in 1850.

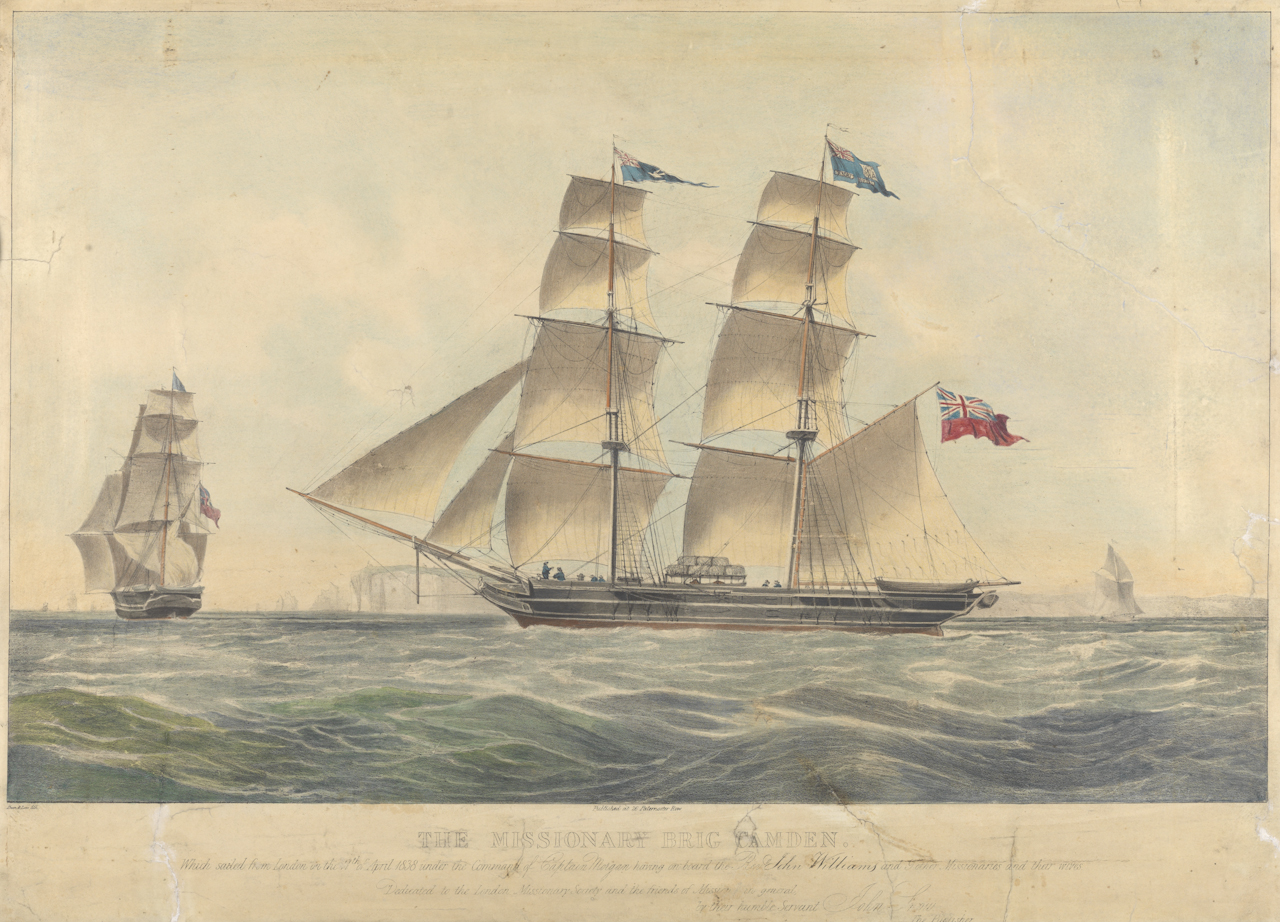
The missionary brig Camden (1838); National Maritime Museum (Greenwich)

- Camden (1819 ship), of 192 or 194 tons (bm), was a Post Office Packet Service Falmouth packet, launched at Falmouth. In 1838 she was sold out of the packet service. She then began sailing in the South Seas for the London Missionary Society. From 1844, under new ownership, she began trading between England, Ireland, and the Continent. She was wrecked circa 1846.

== See also ==
- USS Camden - two ships
