= Ji Di =

Chinese research vessel

History

China
- Name: Ji Di
- Operator: State Oceanic Administration North Sea Branch
- Port of registry: Qingdao, China
- Builder: Guangzhou Shipyard International (Guangzhou, China)
- Yard number: 21110017
- Launched: 29 December 2023
- Completed: 22 May 2024
- Identification: IMO number: 9970351; Call sign: BPNU5
- Status: In service

General characteristics
- Type: Research vessel
- Tonnage: 4,539 GT; 1,361 NT; 1,763 DWT
- Displacement: 5,600 t (5,500 long tons)
- Length: 89.95 m (295 ft)
- Beam: 17.8 m (58 ft)
- Draft: 5.5 m (18 ft)
- Ice class: Polar Class 6
- Installed power: Four main diesel generators
- Propulsion: Diesel-electric; two ABB Azipod units (2 × 3.2 MW)
- Speed: 15 knots (28 km/h; 17 mph)
- Range: 14,000 nautical miles (26,000 km; 16,000 mi)
- Endurance: 80 days
- Crew: 60

Ji Di (simplified Chinese: 极地; traditional Chinese: 極地; lit. 'Polar') is a Chinese icebreaking research vessel built in 2024 for the State Oceanic Administration North Sea Branch.

Concurrently with Ji Di, Guangzhou Shipyard International built a slightly bigger Polar Class 4 research vessel, Tan Suo San Hao, which was delivered in December 2024.

== Design ==
Ji Di is 89.95 metres (295 ft) long overall and has a beam of 17.8 metres (58 ft) and draft of 5.5 metres (18 ft). The 5,600-tonne (5,500-long-ton) vessel has accommodation for 60 persons, operational range of 14,000 nautical miles (26,000 km; 16,000 mi), and can remain at sea for 80 days.

Ji Di has a diesel-electric propulsion system with four main diesel generators and two 3.2-megawatt (4,300 hp) ABB Azipod azimuth thrusters. The ship's speed in open water is 15 knots (28 km/h; 17 mph) and it can break 1-metre (3.3 ft) level ice at a speed of 1.5 to 2 knots (2.8 to 3.7 km/h; 1.7 to 2.3 mph).

Ji Di is built to Polar Class 6, the second-lowest ice class defined in the International Association of Classification Societies (IACS) Unified Requirements for Polar Class Ships, which is intended for summer and autumn operation in medium first-year ice between 70 and 120 cm (28 and 47 in) in thickness that may contain small inclusions of old sea ice that has survived at least one summer without melting completely.

== History ==
The ship's construction was awarded to Guangzhou Shipyard International, a subsidiary of the China State Shipbuilding Corporation, in March 2022 and the construction began shortly afterwards. It was floated out on 29 December 2023 and completed on 22 May 2024.

Ji Di, Chinese for "polar", entered service with the State Oceanic Administration North Sea Branch on 24 June 2024. In August, the ship left for its first voyage to the Arctic.
