= Tan Suo San Hao =

Chinese research vessel

- Shipyard's visualization of Tan Suo San Hao

History

China
- Name: Tan Suo San Hao
- Operator: Institute of Deep-sea Science and Engineering
- Port of registry: Sanya, China
- Builder: Guangzhou Shipyard International (Guangzhou, China)
- Cost: ¥800 million
- Yard number: 22110017
- Launched: 20 April 2024
- Completed: 26 December 2024
- Identification: IMO number: 1024637; Call sign: BPPW8
- Status: In service

General characteristics
- Type: Research vessel
- Tonnage: 8,892 GT; 2,667 NT; 3,100 DWT
- Displacement: 9,300 t (9,200 long tons)
- Length: 104 m (341 ft)
- Beam: 19.7 m (65 ft)
- Draft: 6.7 m (22 ft)
- Ice class: Polar Class 4
- Installed power: 4 × Wärtsilä 6L32 (4 × 3,000 kW)
- Propulsion: Diesel-electric; two ABB Azipod DI1400 units (2 × 4.5 MW)
- Speed: 16 knots (30 km/h; 18 mph)
- Range: 15,000 nautical miles (28,000 km; 17,000 mi)
- Crew: 32 crew; 48 scientists

Tan Suo San Hao (simplified Chinese: 探索三号; traditional Chinese: 探索三號; lit. 'Discovery Three') is a Chinese icebreaking research vessel operated by the Institute of Deep-sea Science and Engineering of the Chinese Academy of Sciences. The vessel entered service in December 2024.

Concurrently with Tan Suo San Hao, Guangzhou Shipyard International built a slightly smaller Polar Class 6 research vessel, Ji Di, which entered service in June 2024.

== Design ==
Tan Suo San Hao measures 104 metres (341 ft) in length overall and 19.7 metres (65 ft) in beam, draws 6.7 metres (22 ft) of water, and displaces 9,300 tonnes (9,200 long tons). The vessel has a multidisciplinary scientific outfit with accommodation for 32 crew and up to 48 scientists as well as ability to deploy China's deep-sea research submersibles Striver, Deep Sea Warrior, and Jiaolong. A 6 by 4.8 metres (20 by 16 ft) moon pool allows deploying and recovering autonomous underwater vehicles in ice-covered waters.

Tan Suo San Hao's diesel-electric propulsion system consists of four 3,000-kilowatt (4,000 hp) six-cylinder Wärtsilä 6L32 main diesel generators that power the ship's two 4.5-megawatt (6,000 hp) ABB Azipod DI1400 azimuth thrusters. This will give the vessel a maximum speed of 16 knots (30 km/h; 18 mph) in open water and enables it to break 1.2-metre (3.9 ft) level ice with a 20-centimetre (7.9 in) snow cover at a continuous speed of 2 knots (3.7 km/h; 2.3 mph) in both ahead and astern directions.

Tan Suo San Hao is built to Polar Class 4, an ice class intended for year-round operation in thick first-year ice which may contain small inclusions of old sea ice that has survived at least one melting season without melting completely.

== History ==
=== Development and construction ===
Tan Suo San Hao is claimed to be the first research vessel of its kind developed indigenously in China. The ¥800 million ship has been jointly funded by the People's Government of Hainan, Sanya Yazhou Bay Science and Technology City, and the vessel's operator, Institute of Deep Sea Science and Engineering of the Chinese Academy of Sciences.

The construction of the vessel began with a steel cutting ceremony at Guangzhou Shipyard International, a subsidiary of the China State Shipbuilding Corporation, on 25 June 2023. The vessel, named Tan Suo San Hao, was floated out on 20 April 2024. The vessel completed the final series of sea trials in October 2024.

=== Career ===
Tan Suo San Hao was delivered on 26 December 2024.
