= Chinese replenishment ship Gaoyouhu =

Type 903A replenishment ship

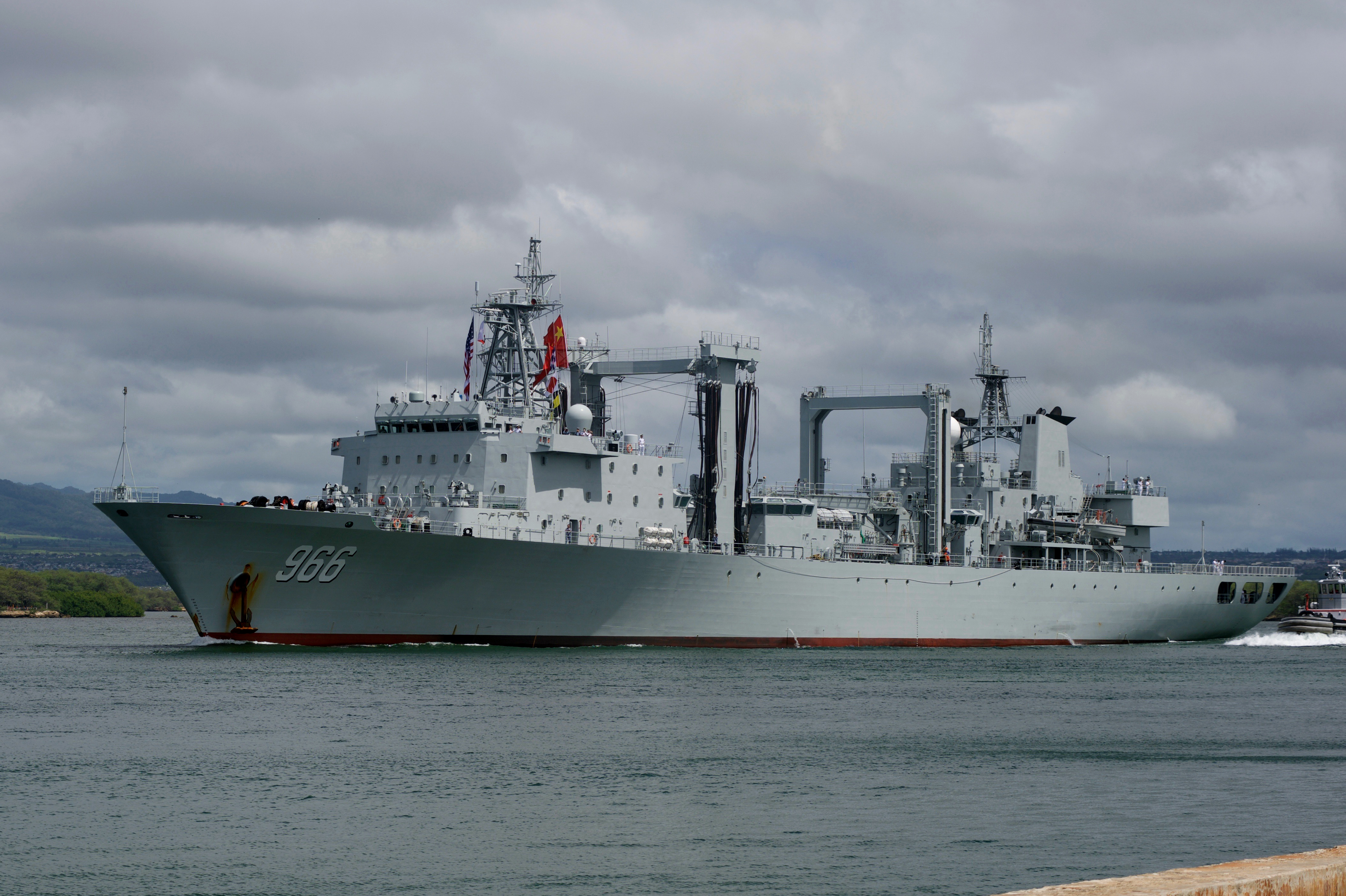
- Gaoyouhu in Pearl Harbor on 5 August 2016

History

China
- Name: Gaoyouhu; (高邮湖)
- Namesake: Gaoyou Lake
- Builder: Huangpu, Guangzhou
- Launched: 20 December 2014
- Commissioned: 29 January 2016
- Identification: Pennant number: 904 (Formerly 966)
- Status: Active

General characteristics
- Class & type: Type 903A replenishment ship
- Displacement: 23,400 tonnes
- Length: 178.5 m (586 ft)
- Beam: 24.8 m (81 ft)
- Draught: 8.7 m (29 ft)
- Propulsion: Two diesels; 24,000 hp (m) (11.9MW) sustained; 2 shafts
- Speed: 20 knots (37 km/h; 23 mph)
- Range: 10,000 nmi (19,000 km; 12,000 mi) at 14 knots (26 km/h; 16 mph)
- Capacity: 10,500 tons of fuel oil; 250 tons of fresh water; 680 tons of cargo and ammunition
- Complement: 130
- Armament: 4 x H/PJ76F twin 37 mm
- Aviation facilities: Hangar; Helipad

Gaoyouhu (904) is a Type 903A replenishment ship of the People's Liberation Army Navy.

== Development and design ==
Type 903 integrated supply ship (NATO called Fuchi-class supply ship) is a new large-scale integrated supply ship of the Chinese People's Liberation Army Navy, designed by Zhang Wende. The later improved model is called 903A. The difference with 903 is that the displacement has increased from 20,530 tons to 23,000 tons.

All 9 ships have been built and are in service. The ship is a new generation of large-scale ocean-going integrated supply ship in China. Its supply equipment has been greatly improved compared to the earlier Type 905 integrated supply ship. It can be used for supply operations in horizontal, vertical, vertical, and sideways. It has two sides, three directions, and four stations. At the same time, the replenishment capability can complete fleet replenishment tasks in more complex situations. And the speed is higher than that of the Qinghaihu built with merchant ships as the standard, with a maximum speed of 20 knots, which can accompany fleet operations. The commissioning of this class of supply ship indicates that the People's Liberation Army Navy has a stable ocean-going combat capability, and this was proved in the subsequent Somalia escort missions. The 903 type integrated supply ship used some Russian equipment in the early stage, and later it was fully localized. This type of supply ship has undergone a comprehensive upgrade of electronic equipment, and has high formation communication capabilities, automatic statistics of materials, and the ability to report to formation command ships.

In the late 1990s, China's integrated supply ship Similan built for the Thai Navy's light aircraft carrier formation is generally considered to be an attempt by China to build a modern integrated supply ship. In the following years, China has learned experience and lessons. Improved on the basis of the Similan, and finally the Type 903 integrated supply ship was designed and finalized by the China State Shipbuilding Corporation.

== Construction and career ==
She was launched on 20 December 2014 at Huangpu Shipyard in Guangzhou and commissioned on 29 January 2016 into the East Sea Fleet.

Gaoyouhu, Hengshui and Xi'an participated in RIMPAC from June 30 to 4 August 2016.

She appeared in Exercise AMAN-2025 with her pennant number changed from 966 to 904.

== Gallery ==
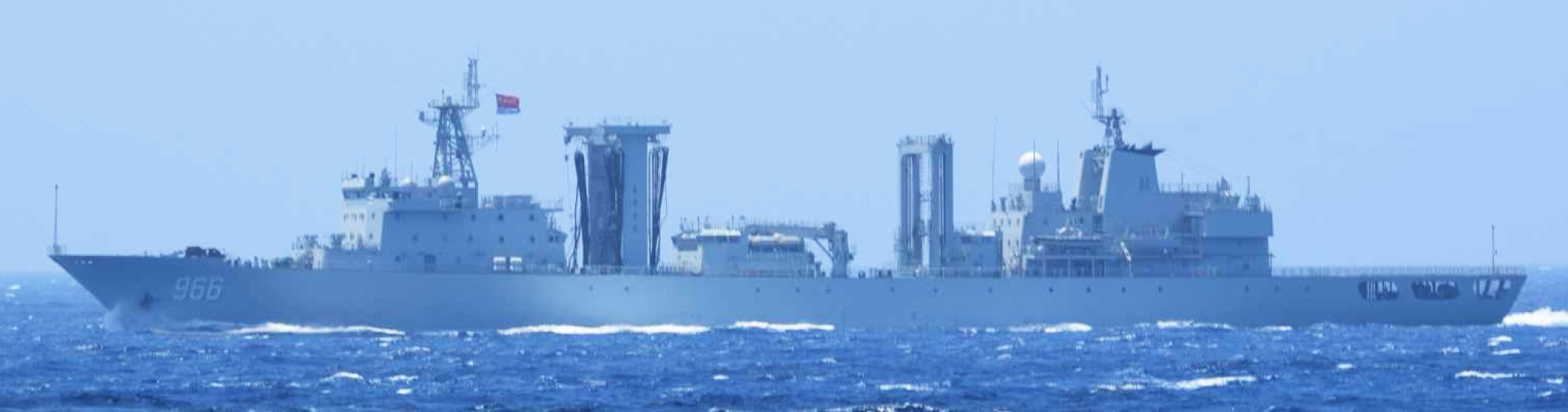
Gaoyouhu underway on 8 April 2016.

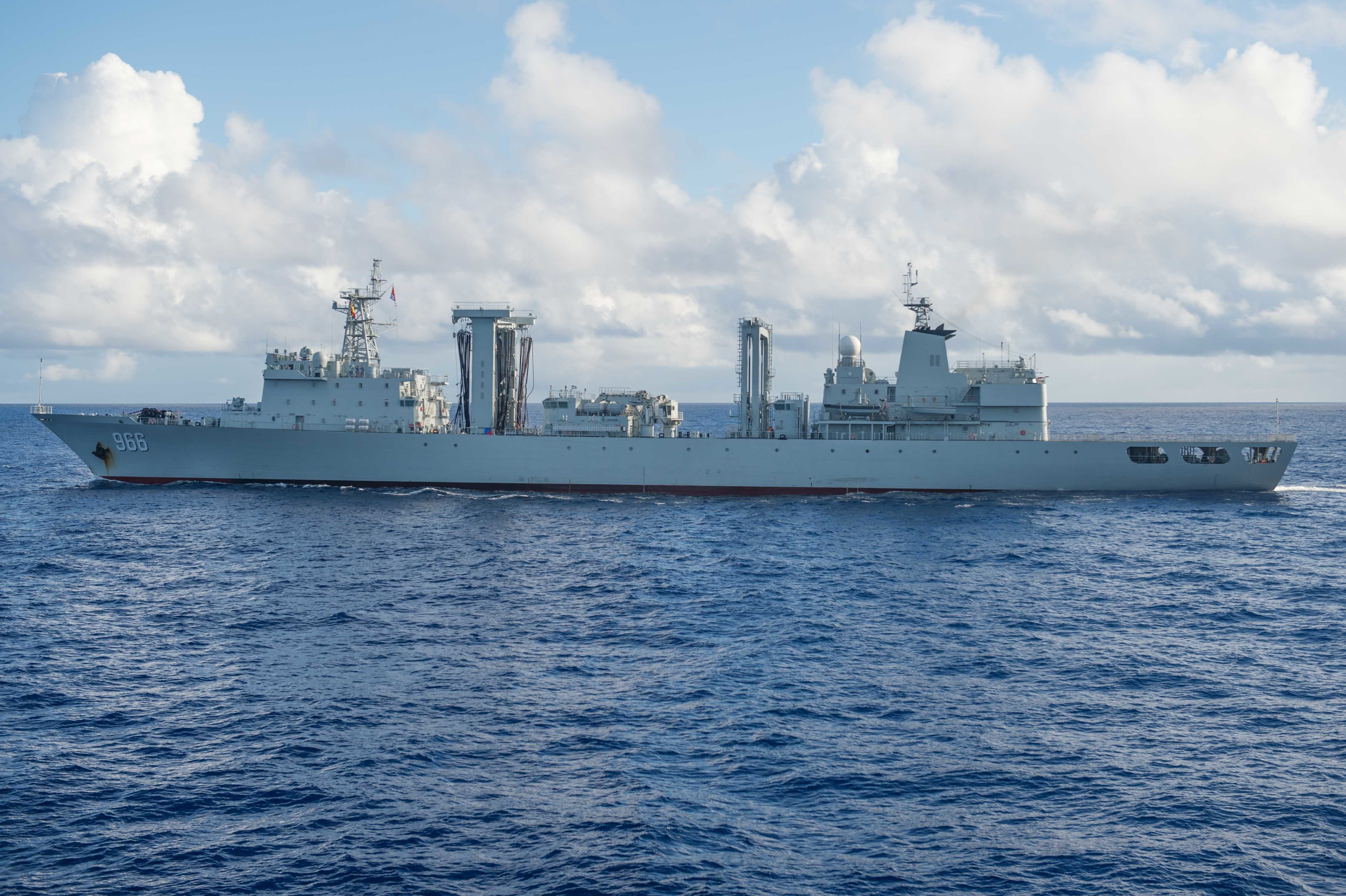
Gaoyouhu during RIMPAC on 15 July 2016.

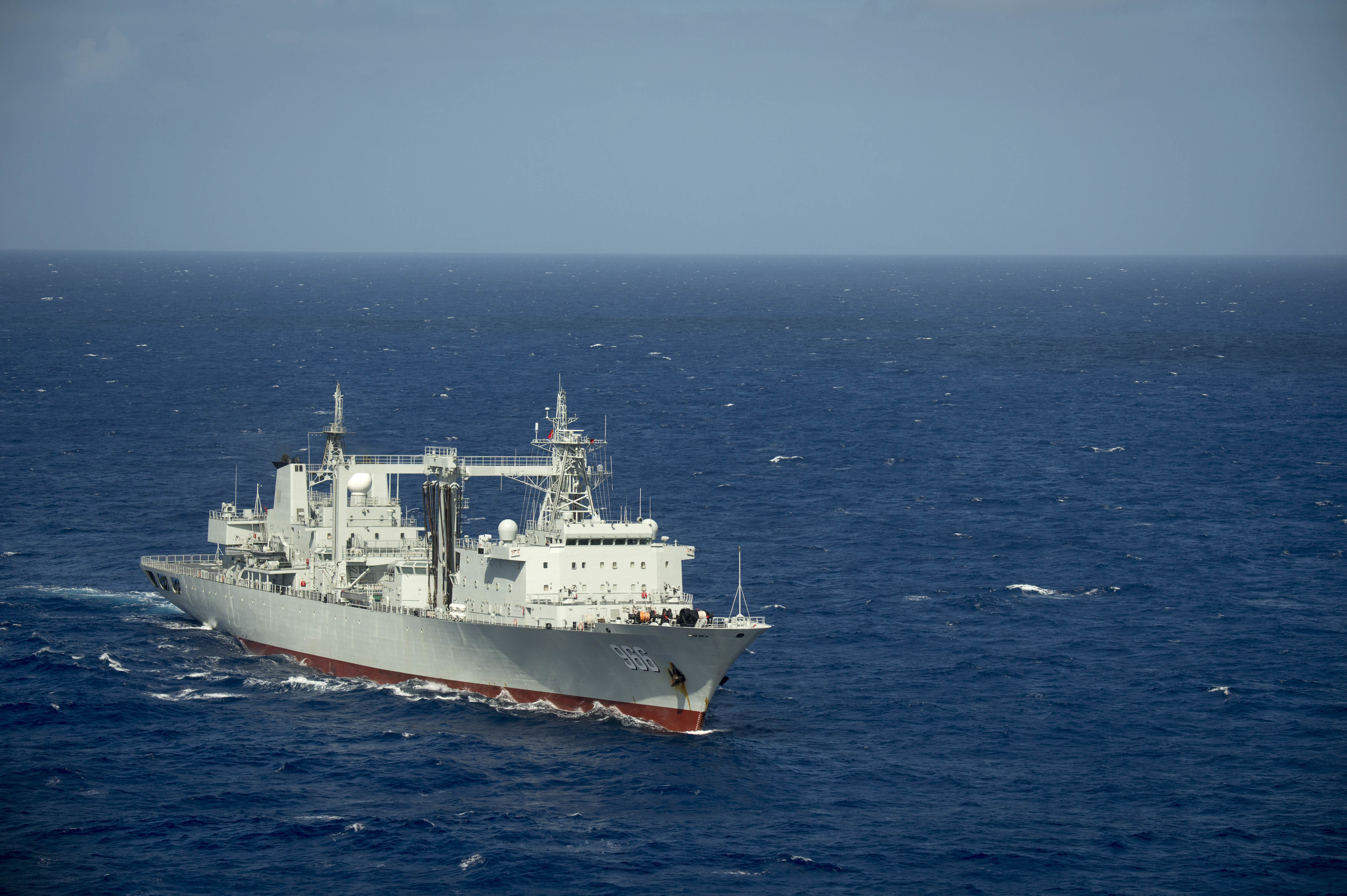
Gaoyouhu during RIMPAC on 28 July 2016.

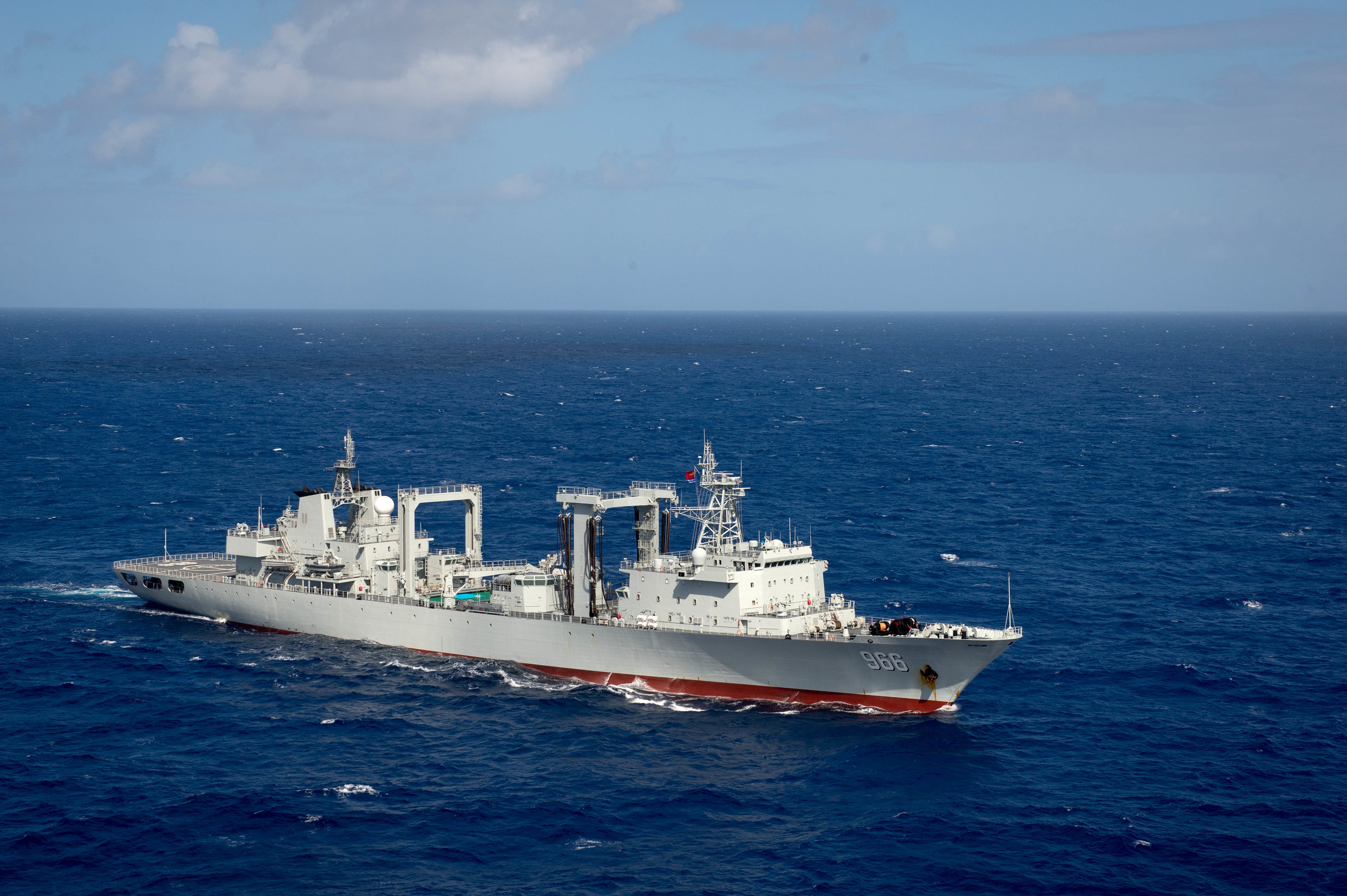
Gaoyouhu during RIMPAC on 28 July 2016.

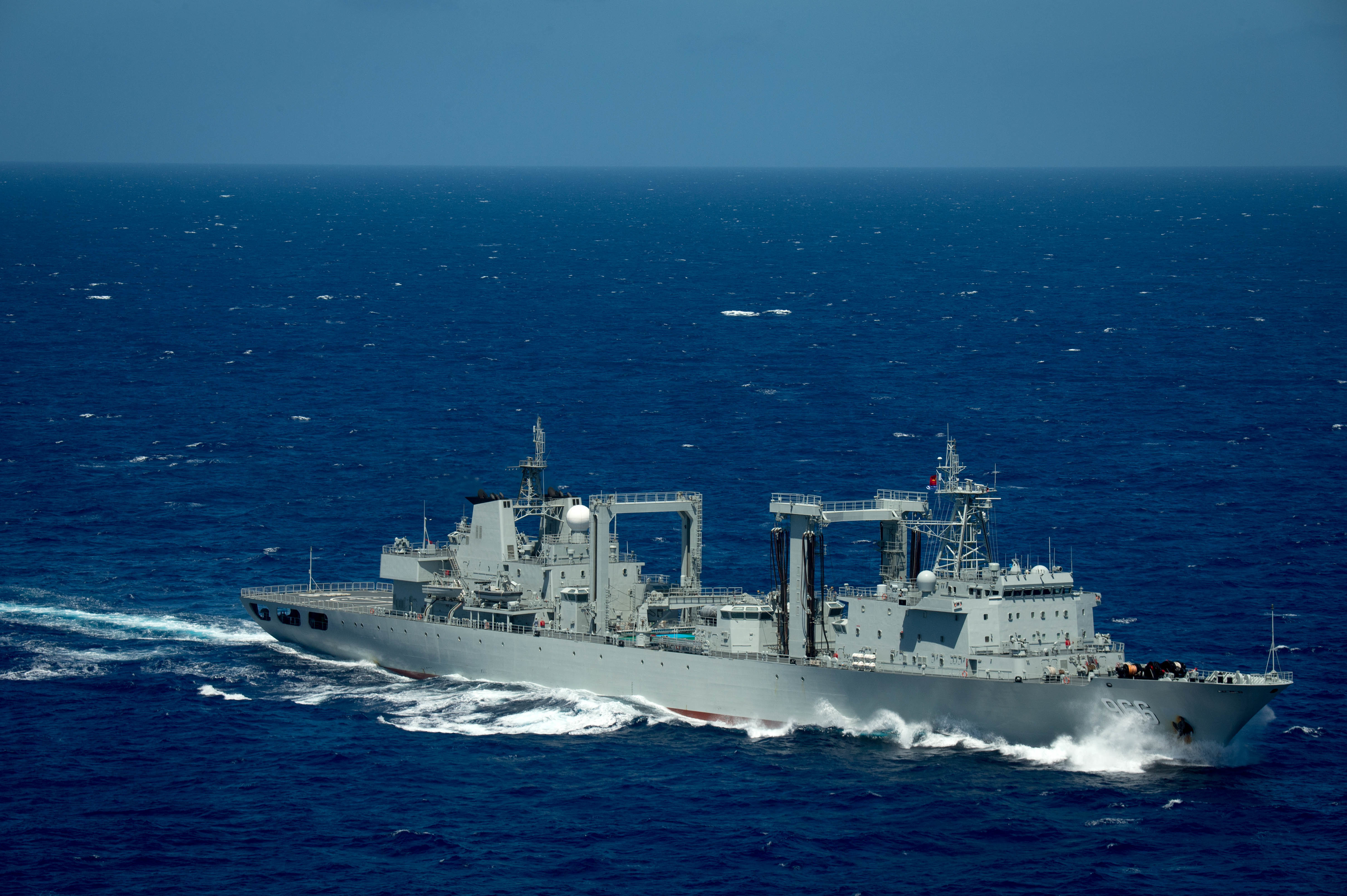
Gaoyouhu during RIMPAC on 28 July 2016.

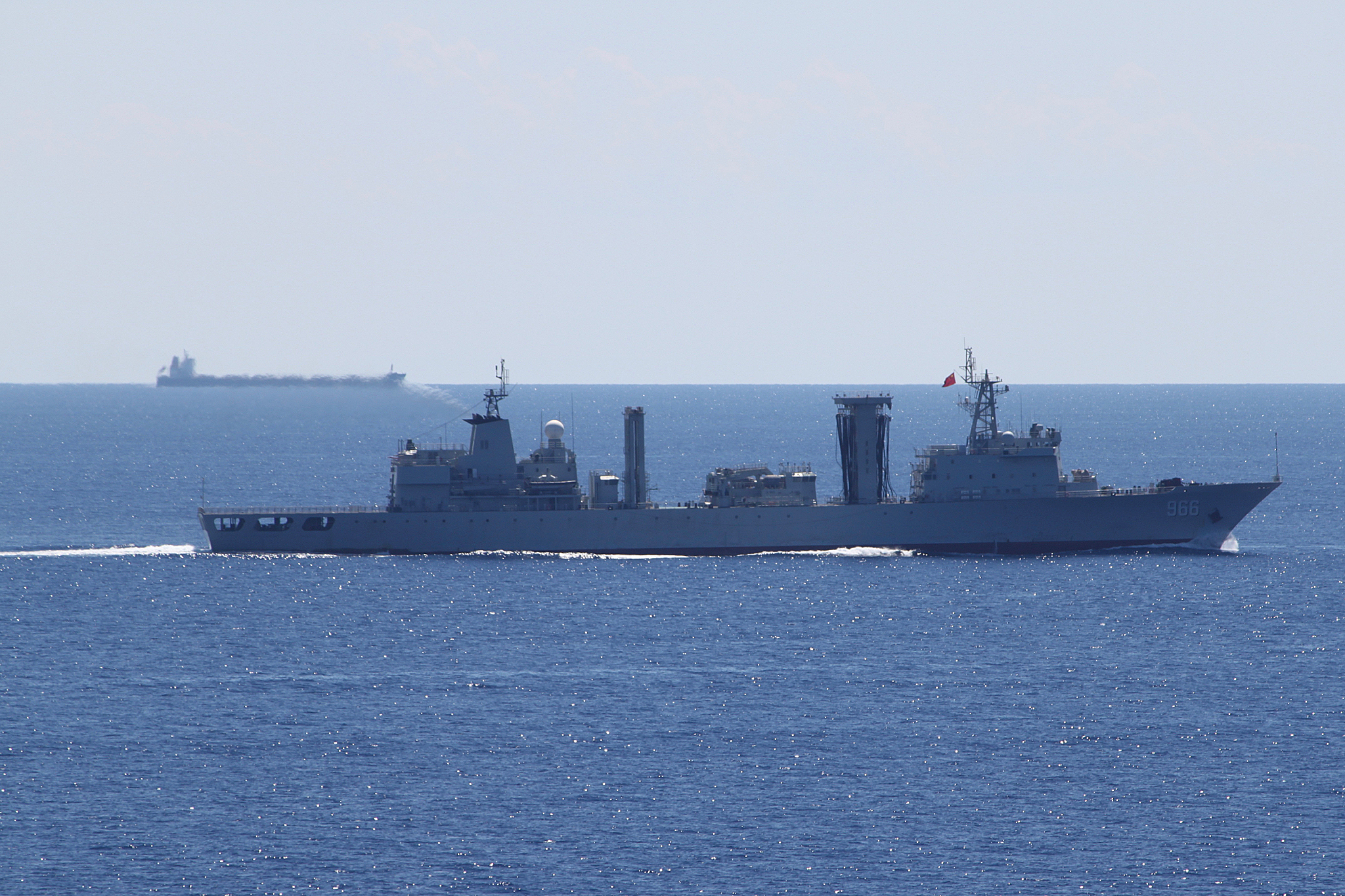
Gaoyaohu underway on 6 September 2017.

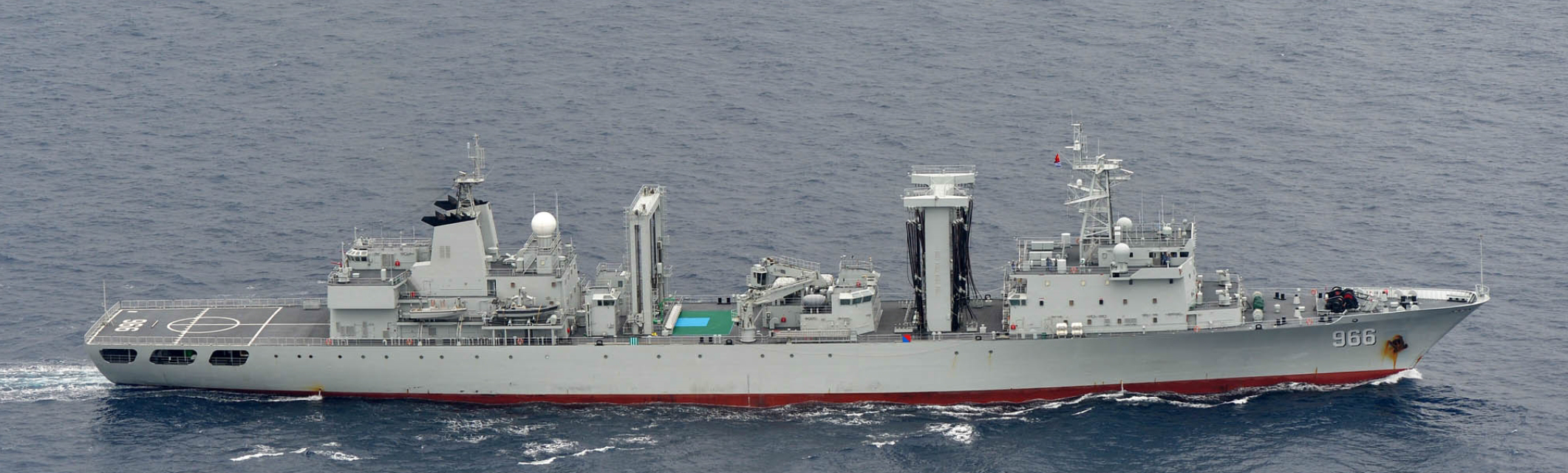
Gaoyouhu underway on 8 August 2018.

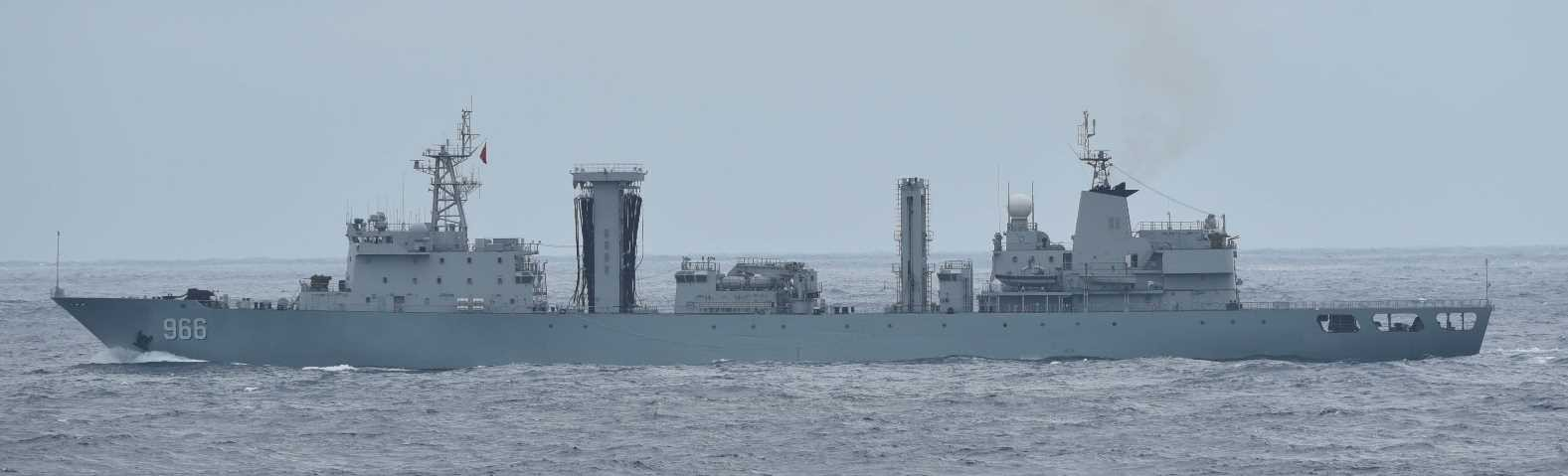
Gaoyouhu underway on 5 April 2019.

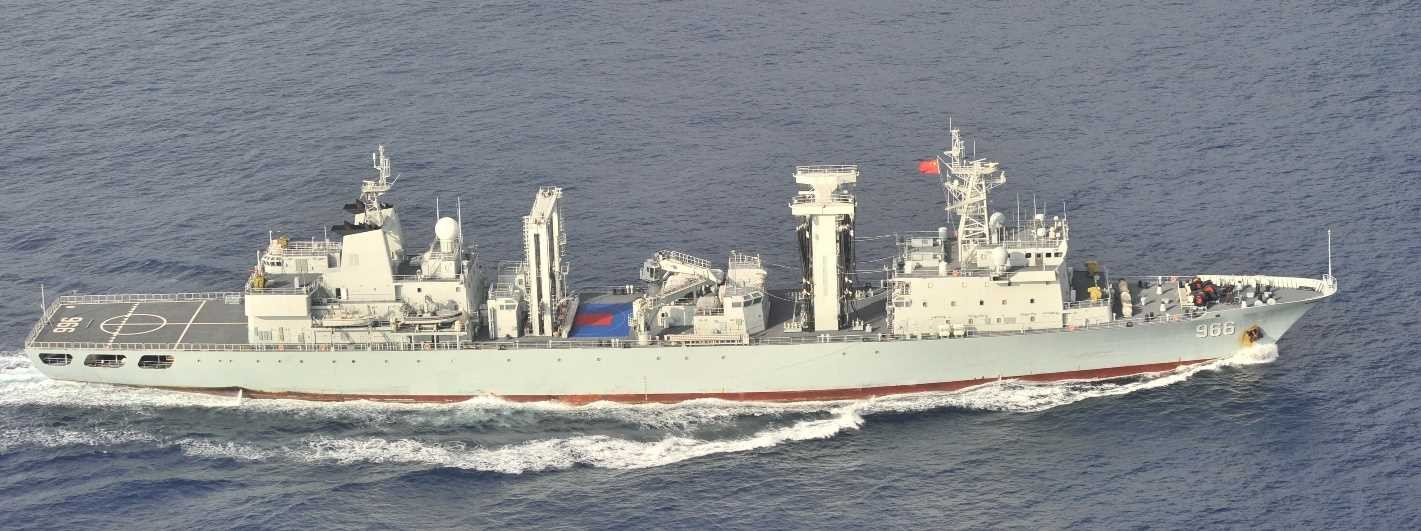
Gaoyouhu underway on 28 October 2019.
