= Type 901 fast combat support ship =

Type 901 replenishment ship

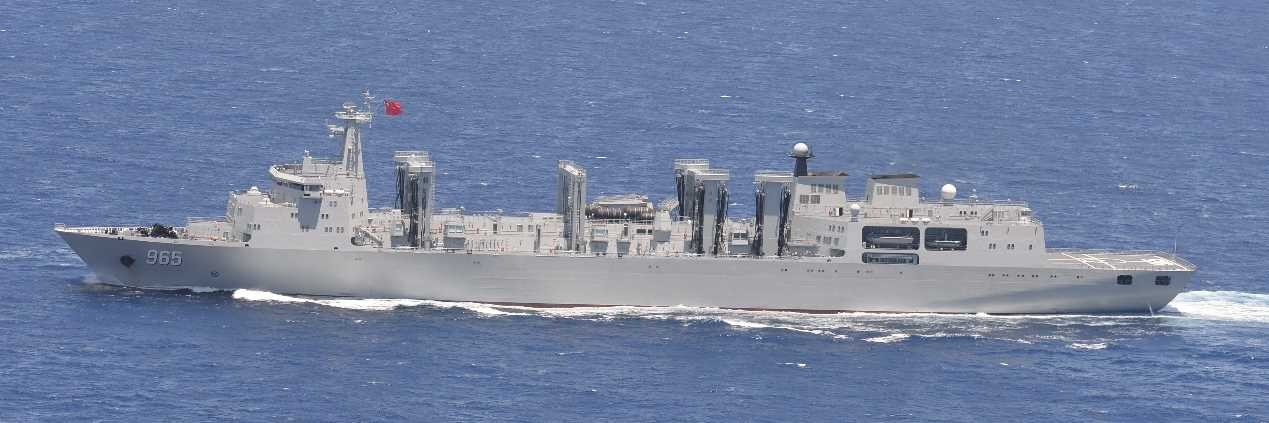

Class overview
- Builders: Guangzhou Shipyard
- Operators: People's Liberation Army Navy
- Preceded by: Type 903A Fuchi class
- Planned: 4
- Building: 2
- Completed: 2
- Active: 2

General characteristics
- Type: Fast combat support ship
- Displacement: 45,000 tons
- Length: 240 m (787 ft 5 in)
- Beam: 31 m (101 ft 8 in)
- Draft: 10.8m
- Propulsion: 4 × QC280 gas turbines; Total output: 112 MW (150,000 hp)
- Speed: 25 kn (46 km/h; 29 mph)
- Sensors & processing systems: Type 347 radar, ZGJ-1B electro-optical system, and ZFJ-1A fire control system
- Armament: 4 x 30 mm H/PJ-13, helipad

The Type 901 comprehensive supply ship (Chinese: 901型综合补给舰, NATO reporting name: Fuyu-class AOE, also known as the Hulunhu class) is a class of fast combat support ships of the Chinese People's Liberation Army Navy.

== Design ==
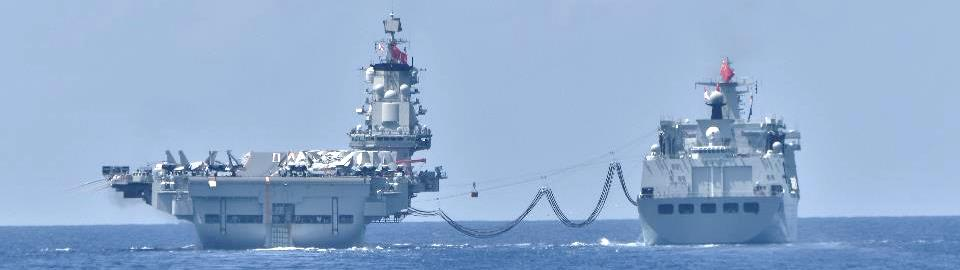
Type 901 and Liaoning conducting underway replenishment

The Type 901 is estimated to have a 45,000 ton displacement and a beam of 31.5 m (103 ft). The ship's propulsion is powered by four QC280 gas turbines, each delivering 28 MW (38,000 hp), for maximum speed of about 25 kn (46 km/h; 29 mph); the speed is necessary to keep up with aircraft carriers. The Type 901 is more than twice the size of the preceding Type 903A and significantly faster.

The Type 901 appears to be designed with similar missions to the Supply-class fast combat support ship which is to keep large surface action groups supplied.

== Ships of the class ==
Name	Namesake	Hull No.	Builder	Laid down	Launched	Commissioned	Fleet	Status
Hulunhu (Chinese: 呼伦湖)	Hulun Lake	901 (Ex-965)	Guangzhou Shipyard International Co.Ltd.		December 2015	1 September 2017		Active
Chaganhu (Chinese: 查干湖)	Chagan Lake	905 (Ex-967)	Guangzhou Shipyard International Co.Ltd.		2017	December 2018		Active
			Guangzhou Longxue	Before March 2026				Under construction

== See also ==
- Type 905 replenishment tanker
- Type 908 replenishment ship
- Sacramento-class fast combat support ship
- Supply-class fast combat support ship
- HSL-class fleet support ship
