= USNS Arctic =

Supply-class fast combat support ship

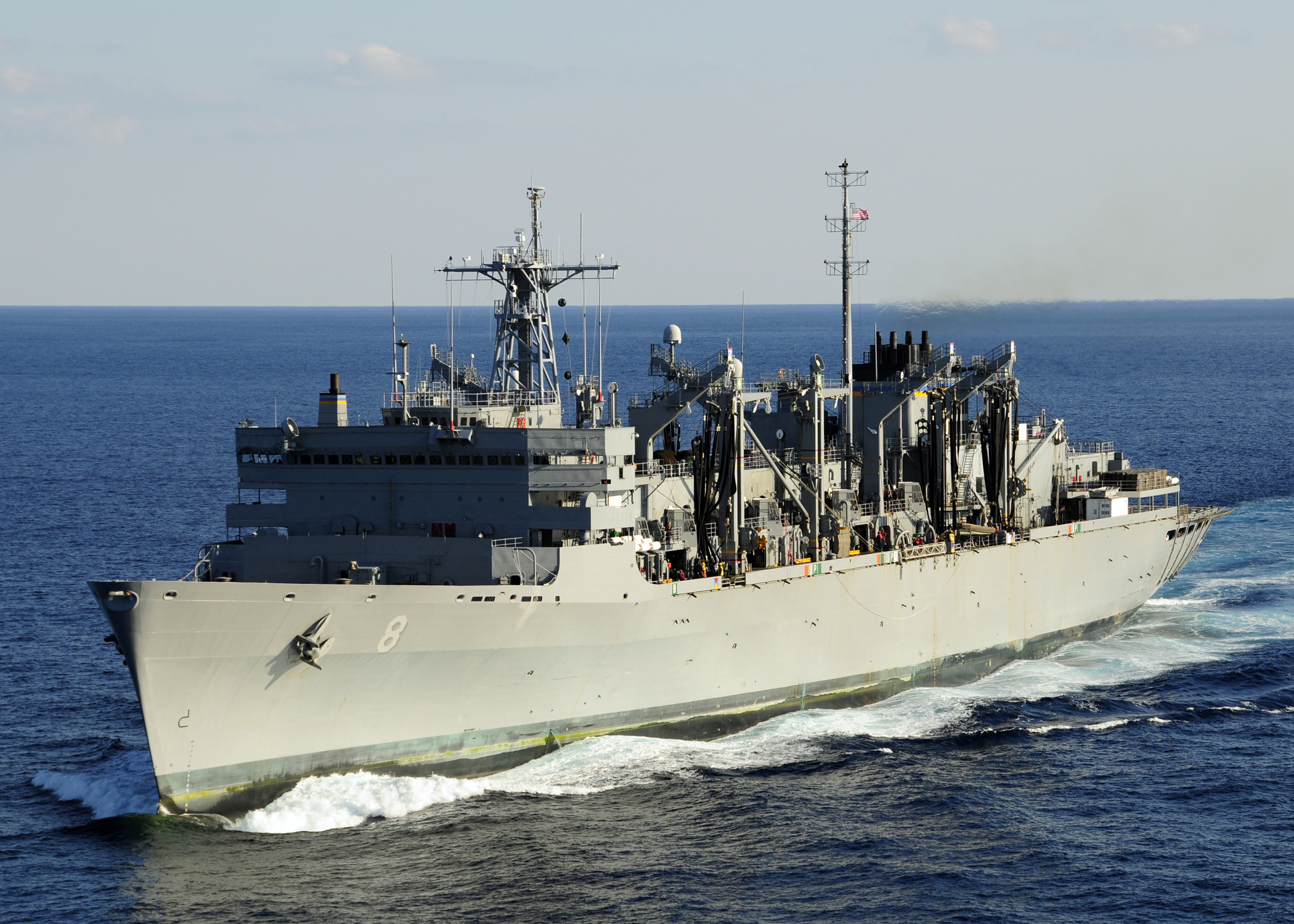
- USNS Arctic

History

United States
- Ordered: 6 December 1989
- Builder: National Steel and Shipbuilding
- Laid down: 2 December 1991
- Launched: 30 October 1993
- Commissioned: 11 September 1995
- Decommissioned: 14 June 2002
- In service: 14 June 2002
- Identification: IMO number: 8644034; MMSI number: 338995000; Callsign: NDRO
- Status: In active service, as of 2025

General characteristics
- Class & type: Supply class
- Displacement: 48,800 long tons (49,600 t)
- Length: 754.6 ft (230.0 m)
- Beam: 107 ft (33 m)
- Draught: 39 ft (12 m)
- Installed power: 105,000 hp (78 MW)
- Propulsion: four General Electric LM 2500 gas turbine engines, Two Propellers
- Speed: 26 knots (48 km/h; 30 mph)
- Complement: 176 civilians, 59 military
- Aircraft carried: Two CH-46E Sea Knight or MH-60S Seahawk helicopters

USNS Arctic (T-AOE 8), formerly USS Arctic (AOE-8), is the third ship in the Supply class of fast combat support ships and is the fifth supply ship to carry the name of the region surrounding the North Pole.

Arctic was built by National Steel and Shipbuilding Company in San Diego, California.

Since decommissioning on 14 June 2002, Arctic has been operated by the Military Sealift Command, homeported in Earle, New Jersey. As a U.S. Naval Ship, Arctic is mostly civilian crewed and no longer carries the weapons systems she previously (as USS Arctic) was equipped with. One of these systems was the Phalanx CIWS.

Arctic has the speed to keep up with the carrier strike groups. She rapidly replenishes Navy task forces and can carry more than 177,000 barrels (28,100 m^{3}) of oil; 2,150 tons of ammunition; 500 tons of dry stores; and 250 tons of refrigerated stores. She receives petroleum products, ammunition, and stores from shuttle ships and redistributes these items simultaneously to carrier strike group ships. This reduces the vulnerability of serviced ships by reducing alongside time.

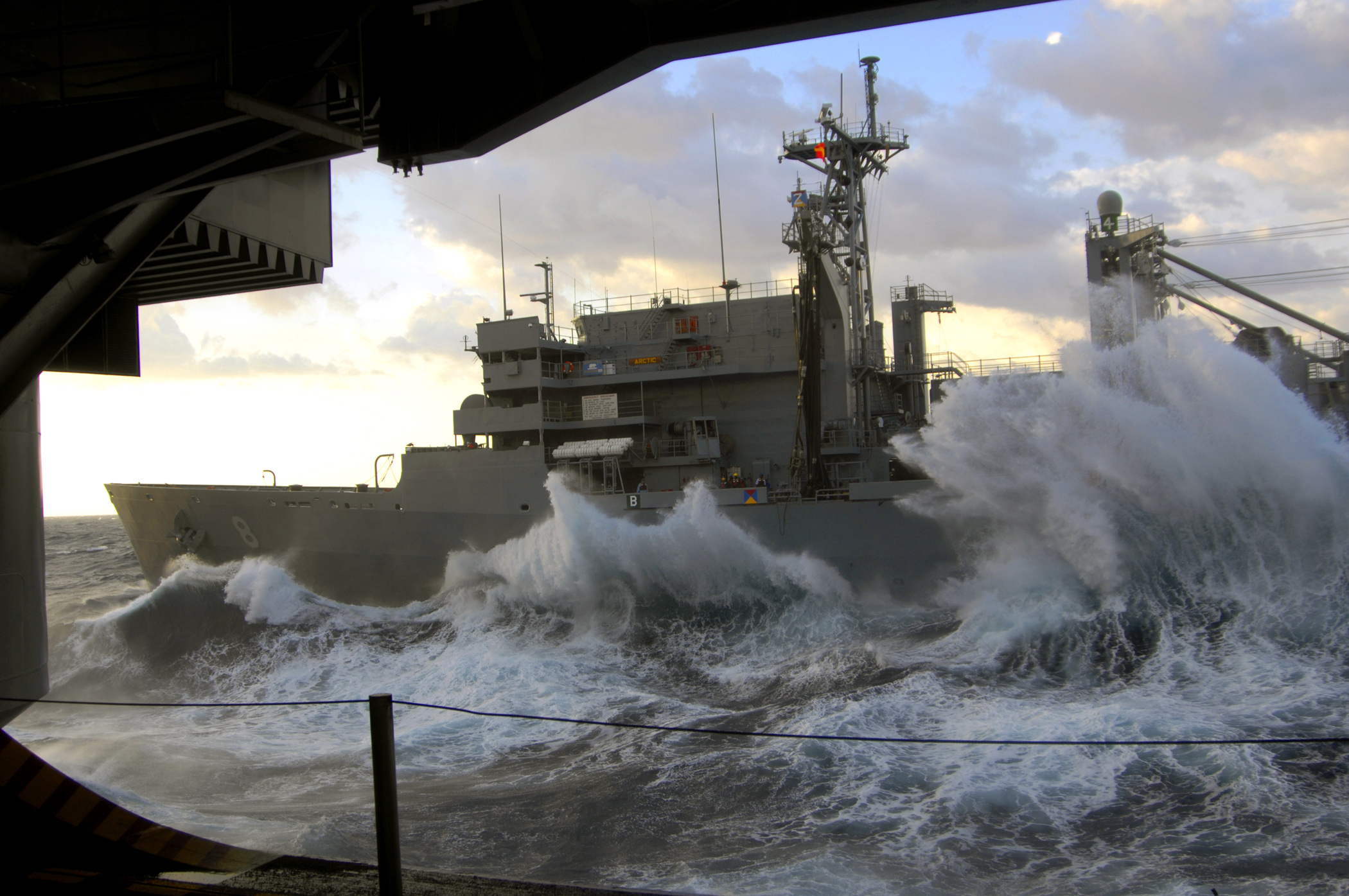
USNS Arctic as she sails alongside Nimitz-class aircraft carrier USS Harry S. Truman.

Like other fast combat support ships, she is part of MSC's Naval Fleet Auxiliary Force.

USNS Arctic's cargo capacities:

- Diesel Fuel Marine (DFM): 1,965,600 US gallons (7,441 m^{3})
- JP-5 fuel: 2,620,800 US gallons (9,921 m^{3})
- Bottled gas: 800 bottles
- Ordnance stowage: 1,800 tons
- Chill and freeze stowage: 400 tons
- Water: 20,000 US gallons (76 m^{3})

USNS Arctic's refueling rigs can pump fuel at a rate of 3,000 US gallons (11 m^{3}) per minute.

== US Army helicopter crash ==
On October 22, 2009, a United States Army UH-60 Black Hawk helicopter from the 3rd Battalion, 160th Special Operations Aviation Regiment crashed into the ship during a joint training exercise involving fast roping about 20 miles (32 km) off Fort Story, Virginia. The crash killed a soldier, Staff Sergeant James R. Stright, 29, and injured eight other service members.
