= USNS Supply =

Supply-class fast combat support ship

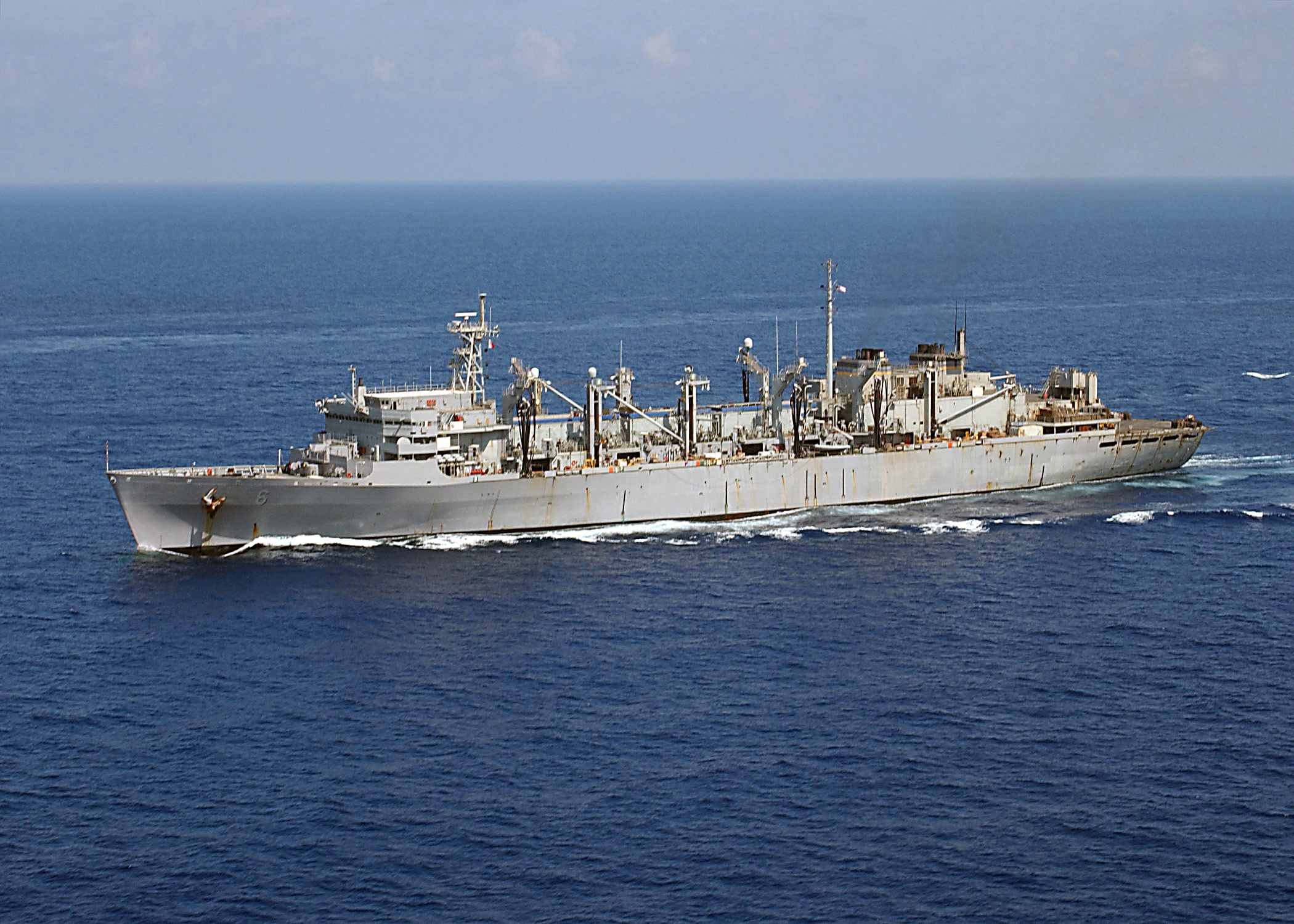

History

United States
- Ordered: 22 January 1987
- Builder: National Steel and Shipbuilding
- Laid down: 24 February 1989
- Launched: 6 October 1990
- Commissioned: 26 February 1994
- Decommissioned: 13 July 2001
- In service: 13 July 2001
- Identification: IMO number: 8644199; MMSI number: 338947000; Callsign: NACO
- Status: in active service

General characteristics
- Class & type: Supply class
- Displacement: 48,800 long tons (49,600 t)
- Length: 754.6 ft (230.0 m)
- Beam: 107 ft (33 m)
- Height: 39 ft (12 m)
- Installed power: 105,000 hp (78 MW)
- Propulsion: four General Electric LM 2500 gas turbine engines, Two Propellers
- Speed: 26 knots (48 km/h; 30 mph)
- Complement: 176 civilians, 59 military
- Aircraft carried: Two CH-46E Sea Knight or MH-60S Seahawk helicopters

USNS Supply (T-AOE-6), ex-USS Supply (AOE-6), is the lead ship of the Supply-class fast combat support ships. She was commissioned in 1994 and decommissioned in 2001, after which she was transferred for service with the U.S. Military Sealift Command.

== Operational history ==
=== U.S. Navy service ===
Supply was laid down on 24 February 1989 and was launched on 6 October 1990. She was commissioned in the United States Navy as USS Supply (AOE-6) on 26 February 1994 at Naval Air Station, North Island in San Diego, California. After her initial outfitting in San Diego, she sailed to Norfolk, Virginia via the Panama Canal and Caribbean Sea, arriving on 7 August 1994.

=== Military Sealift Command service ===
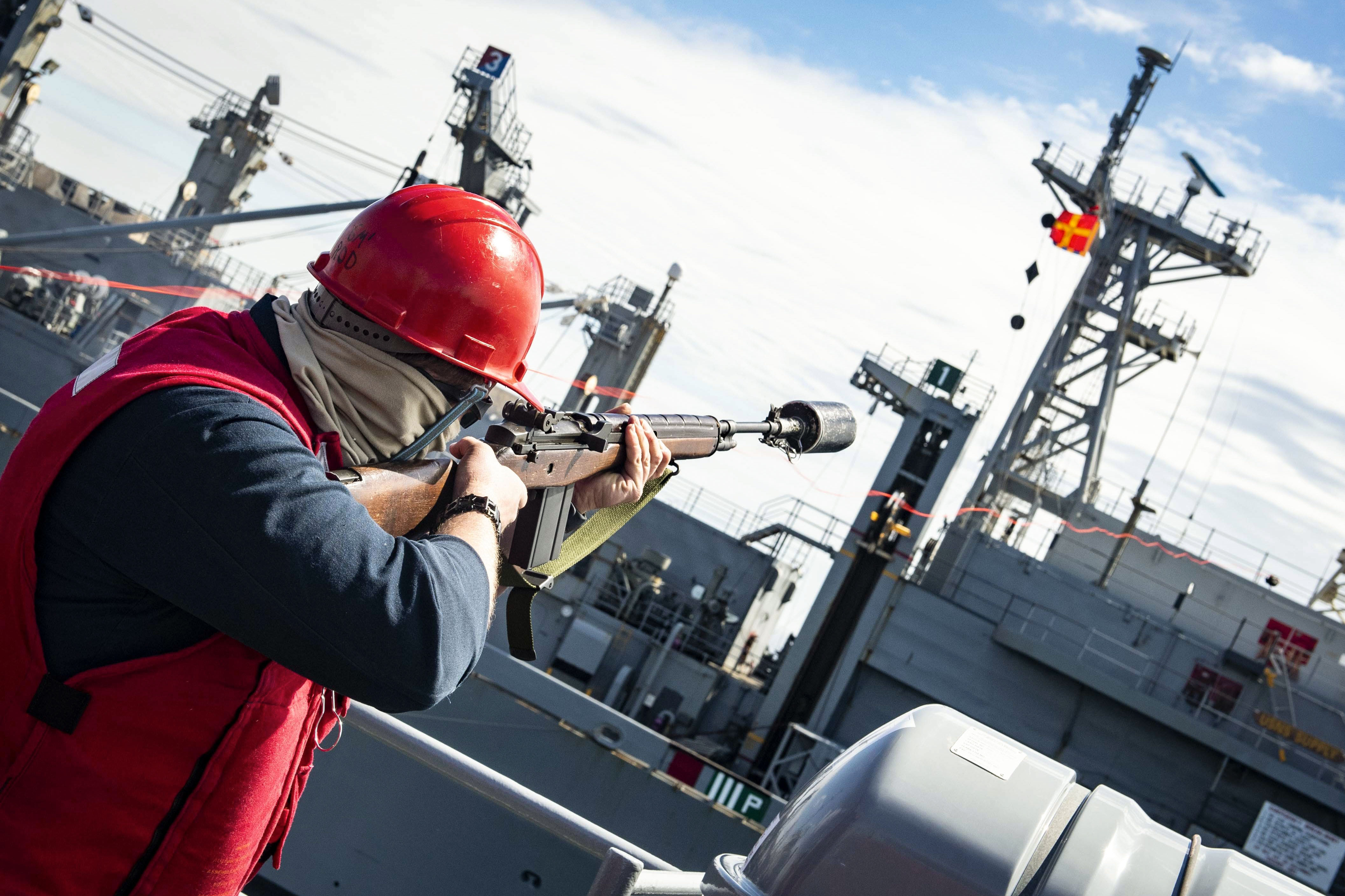
A sailor fires a supply line to USNS Supply in the Baltic Sea on 16 June 2020

After service in the U.S. Navy from 1994 through 2001 as USS Supply (AOE-6), she was decommissioned and her weapons systems were removed, then she was transferred on 13 July 2001 to the Military Sealift Command, which designated her USNS Supply (T-AOE-6). Like other fast combat support ships, she is part of MSC's Naval Fleet Auxiliary Force.

In 2014, Supply put into BAE Systems Southeast Shipyards in Mobile, Alabama for repairs.

In late 2018, Supply was to undergo additional repairs and maintenance, with a contract awarded to a shipyard in Boston, Massachusetts.

On 6 May 2022, Supply conducted an underway replenishment (UNREP) with cruiser USS San Jacinto (CG-56).

On 4 September 2024, Supply was awarded the Navy Unit Commendation for her support of the USS Dwight D. Eisenhower (CVN-69) Carrier Strike Group during Operation Prosperity Guardian, in which the crew of the Supply provided tens of thousands of pallets of critical supplies and millions of gallons of fuel.

On 11 February 2026, Supply collided with destroyer USS Truxtun (DDG-103) during an UNREP in the Caribbean Sea. Two sailors received minor injuries but were reportedly in stable condition, and both ships were able to continue safely after the collision.

== Al Qaeda target ==
USNS Supply was allegedly the target of Al Qaeda in the Indian Subcontinent (AQIS) in 2014. AQIS claimed through Twitter and other social media forums that the AQIS attack on Pakistan Navy frigate PNS Zulfiquar was intended to attack USS Supply (sic). AQIS report contradicts the official Pakistan Navy account of the attack which states that the frigate was attacked by AQIS at the Naval Dockyard in Karachi. AQIS claims that PNS Zulfiqar crew were involved in the attempt to take over the ship at sea for attacking USS Supply and its unnamed naval escort.
