= Chinese tanker Hua Chuan =

Chinese tanker

History

PRC
- Commissioned: March 2013

General characteristics
- Type: Oiler
- Displacement: 6,000 long tons (6,100 t)
- Length: 110 m (360 ft 11 in)
- Beam: 17.6 m (57 ft 9 in)
- Propulsion: Marine Diesel
- Speed: 14.2 kt
- Electronic warfare & decoys: None
- Armament: Unarmed
- Armour: None
- Aircraft carried: None
- Aviation facilities: None

Hua Chuan (华川) tanker is the first military/civilian dual use oil tanker built in the People’s Republic of China (PRC) for the People's Liberation Army Navy (PLAN). Built by Guangzhou Shipyard, the 6000 ton tanker first entered service in March 2013, and is usually deployed for civilian use in general. When activated for military use, it acts as a replenishment oiler (AOR), a mission it first performed on October 25, 2014, thus proving the design was successful. Specification:

- Length: 110 meter
- Beam: 11.6 meter
- Tonnage: 6000 ton
- Speed: 14.2 kt

Name (English)	Name (Han 中文)	Tonnage (t)	Commissioned	Status
Hua Chuan	华川	6000	March 2013	Active
