= Carrier battle group =

Type of naval fleet with an aircraft carrier

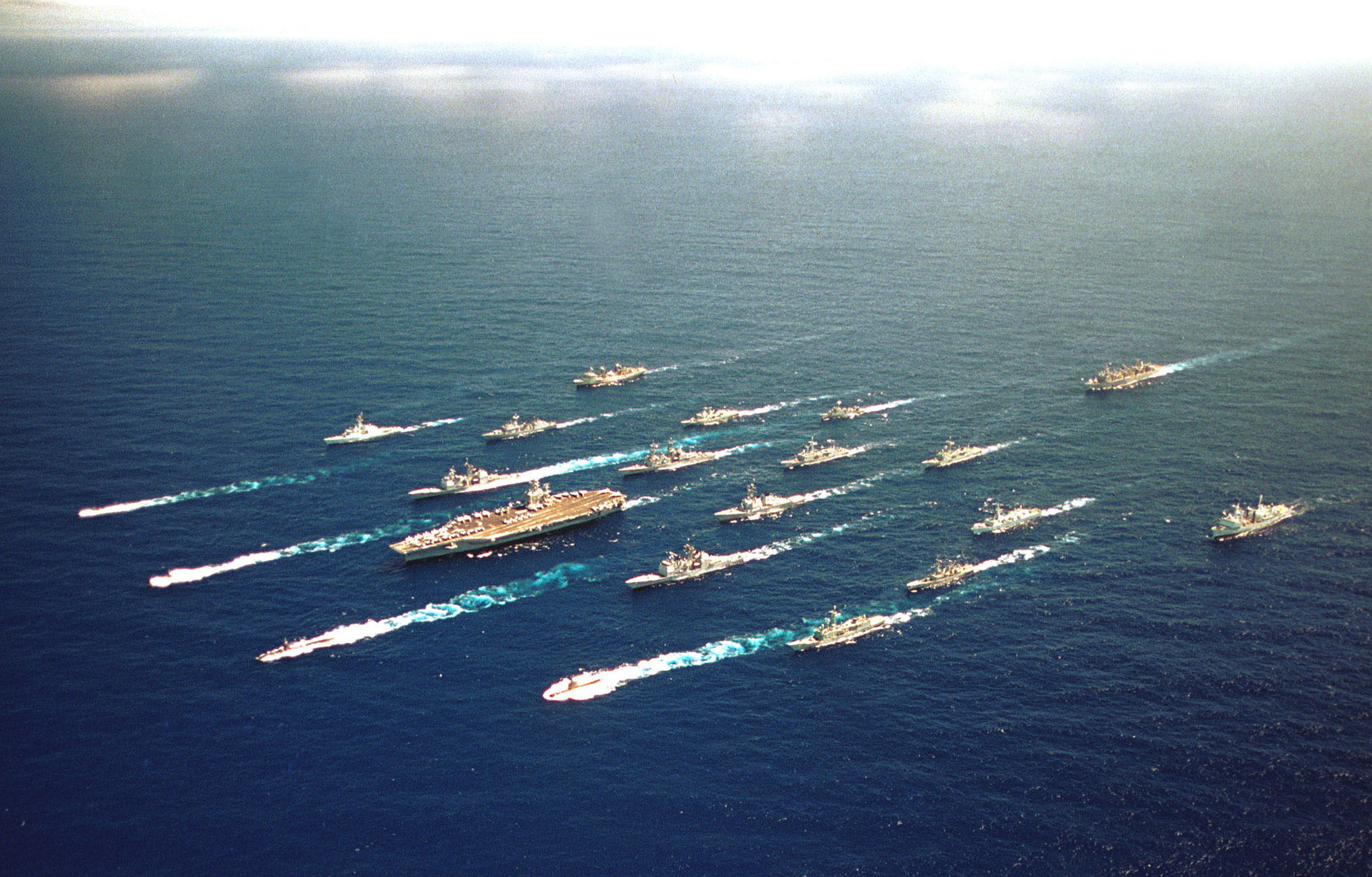
The USS Abraham Lincoln carrier battle group during the 2000 RIMPAC exercise

A carrier battle group (CVBG) is a naval fleet consisting of an aircraft carrier capital ship and its large number of escorts, together defining the group. The CV in CVBG is the United States Navy hull classification code for an aircraft carrier.

The first naval task forces built around carriers appeared just prior to and during World War II. The Imperial Japanese Navy (IJN) was the first to assemble many carriers into a single task force, known as the Kido Butai. This task force was used with devastating effect in the Japanese attack on Pearl Harbor. The Kido Butai operated as the IJN's main carrier battle group until four of its carriers were sunk at the Battle of Midway. In contrast, the United States Navy deployed its large carriers in separate formations, with each carrier assigned its own cruiser and destroyer escorts. These single-carrier formations would often be paired or grouped together for certain assignments, most notably the Battle of the Coral Sea and Midway. By 1943, however, large numbers of fleet and light carriers became available, which required larger formations of three or four carriers. These groups eventually formed the Fast Carrier Task Force, which became the primary battle unit of the U.S. Third and Fifth Fleets.

With the construction of the large "supercarriers" of the Cold War era, the practice of operating each carrier in a single formation was revived. During the Cold War, the main role of the CVBG in case of conflict with the Soviet Union would have been to protect Atlantic supply routes between the United States and its NATO allies in Europe, while the role of the Soviet Navy would have been to interrupt these sea lanes, a fundamentally easier task. Because the Soviet Union had no large carriers of its own, a situation of dueling aircraft carriers would have been unlikely. However, a primary mission of the Soviet Navy's attack submarines was to track every allied battle group and, on the outbreak of hostilities, sink the carriers. Understanding this threat, the CVBG expended enormous resources in its own anti-submarine warfare mission.

== Carrier battle groups in crises ==
In the late 20th and early 21st centuries, most uses of carrier battle groups by the United States as well as that of other Western nations have been in situations where their use has been uncontested by other comparable forces. During the Cold War, an important battle scenario was an attack against a CVBG using numerous anti-ship missiles.

=== 1956 Suez Crisis ===
British and French carrier battle groups were involved in the 1956 Suez Crisis.

=== 1971 Indo-Pakistan war ===
During the Indo-Pakistani War of 1971, India used its carrier strike group centered on INS Vikrant to impose a naval blockade on East Pakistan. Air strikes were carried out initially on shipping in the harbors of Chittagong and Cox's Bazar, sinking or incapacitating most ships there. Further strikes were carried out on Cox's Bazar from 60 nautical miles (110 km) offshore. On the evening of 4 December, the air group again struck Chittagong harbor. Later strikes targeted Khulna and the Port of Mongla. Air strikes continued until 10 December 1971.

=== 1982 Falklands War ===
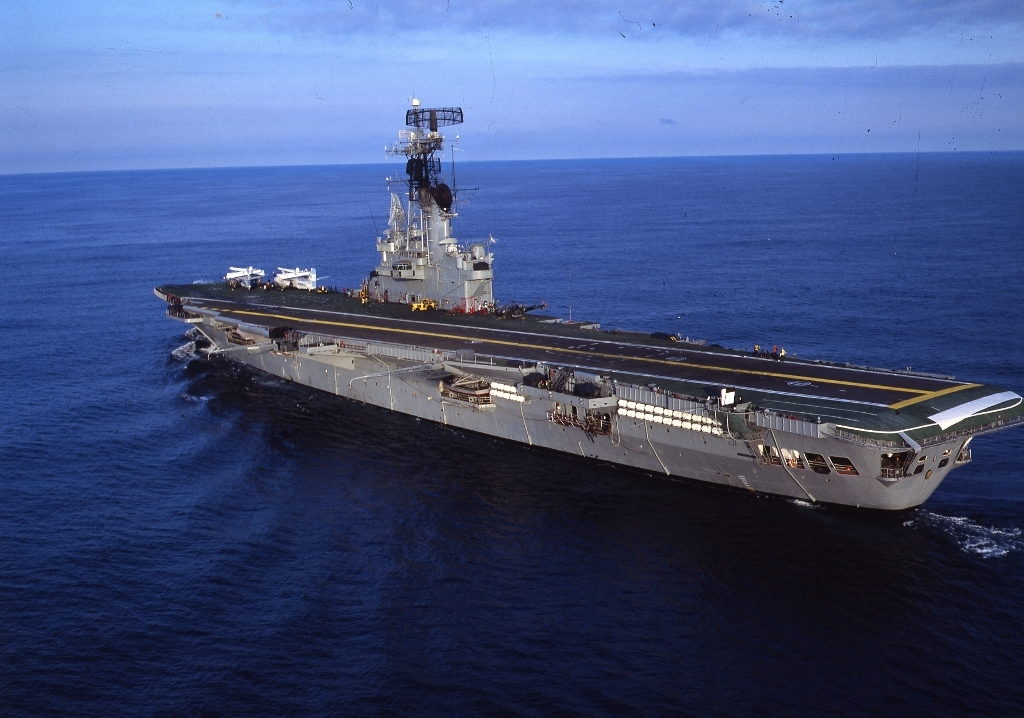
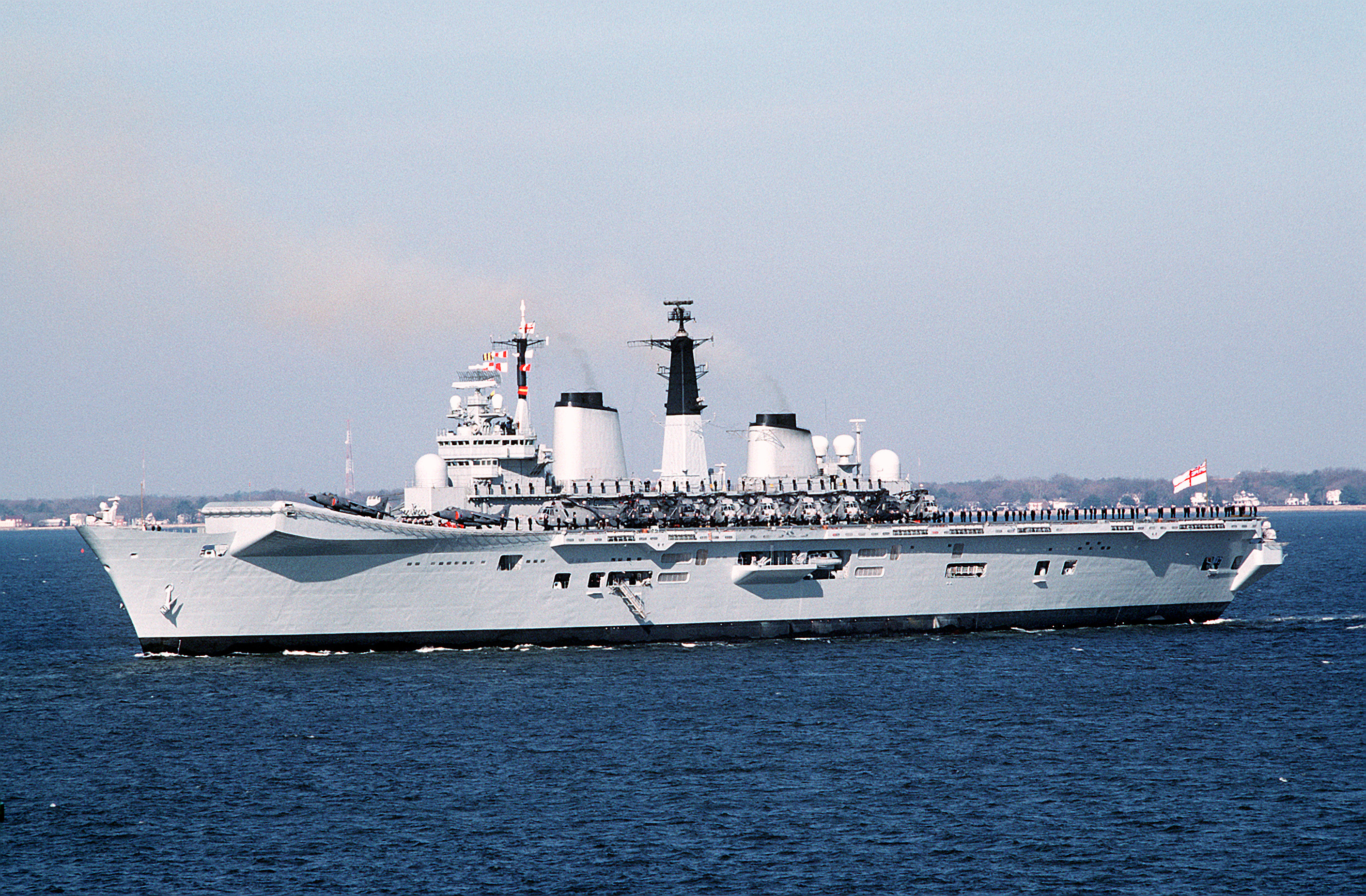
Both ARA Veinticinco de Mayo and HMS Invincible took part in the Falklands War.

The first attempted use of anti-ship missiles against a carrier battle group was part of Argentina's efforts against British armed forces during the Falklands War. This was the last conflict so far in which opposing belligerents employed aircraft carriers, although Argentina made little use of its sole carrier, ARA Veinticinco de Mayo, which was originally built in the United Kingdom as HMS Venerable and later served with the Royal Netherlands Navy (1948–1968).

=== Lebanon ===
The United States Sixth Fleet assembled a force of three carrier battle groups and a battleship during the Lebanese Civil War in 1983. Daily reconnaissance flights were flown over the Bekaa Valley and a strike was flown against targets in the area resulting in loss of an A-6 Intruder and an A-7 Corsair.

=== Gulf of Sidra ===
Carrier battle groups routinely operated in the Gulf of Sidra inside the "Line of Death" proclaimed by Libya resulting in aerial engagements in 1981, 1986 and 1989 between U.S. Navy Tomcats and Libyan Su-22 aircraft, SA-5 surface-to-air missiles and MiG-23 fighters. During the 1986 clashes, three carrier battle groups deployed to the Gulf of Sidra and ultimately two of them conducted strikes against Libya in Operation El Dorado Canyon.

=== 2011 military intervention in Libya ===
During the international military intervention in the 2011 Libyan civil war, the French Navy deployed its aircraft carrier, Charles de Gaulle, off Libya. The Charles de Gaulle was accompanied by several frigates as Forbin, Dupleix, Aconit, the replenishment tanker Meuse and two Rubis-class nuclear attack submarines.

== Applications ==
=== China ===
China plans to set up several carrier battle groups in the future. At present China's two aircraft carriers, Liaoning and Shandong, use Type 055 destroyers for area air defence with anti-submarine warfare, Type 052C or Type 052D destroyers for air defence, Type 054A frigates for anti-submarine and anti-ship warfare, one to two Type 093 nuclear attack submarines, and one Type 901 supply ship. China has built a third carrier, which just entered service in 2025, and a nuclear-powered fourth carrier supposed to be under construction and expected to be completed by the late 2035s.

=== France ===
The only serving French carrier is the Charles de Gaulle, which also serves as the flagship of the French Navy. The carrier battle group of the Force d'Action Navale is known as the Groupe Aéronaval (GAN) and is usually composed, in addition to the aircraft carrier, of:

- a carrier air wing (Groupe Aérien Embarqué, GAE, in French), a complement composed of about 40 aircraft:
  - Rafale F3 (up to 30)
  - E-2C Hawkeye (2)
  - SA365 Dauphin (3) for RESCO and EC725 Caracal for CSAR (2)
- one Rubis-class submarine
- two anti-submarine destroyers (currently FREMM ASM or Georges Leygues class)
- one or two anti-air destroyers (Horizon or Cassard class)
- one stealth frigate in forward patrol (usually a La Fayette class)
- one supply ship (currently a Durance-class tanker)

This group is commanded by a rear admiral (contre-amiral) on board the aircraft carrier. The commanding officer of the air group (usually a capitaine de frégate—equivalent to commander) is subordinate to the commanding officer of the aircraft carrier, a senior captain. The escort destroyers (called frigates in the French denomination) are commanded by more junior captains.

France also operates three Mistral-class amphibious assault ships. While incapable of operating fixed-winged aircraft, they function as helicopter carriers and form the backbone of France's amphibious force. These ships are typically escorted by the same escorts Charles De Gaulle uses.

=== India ===
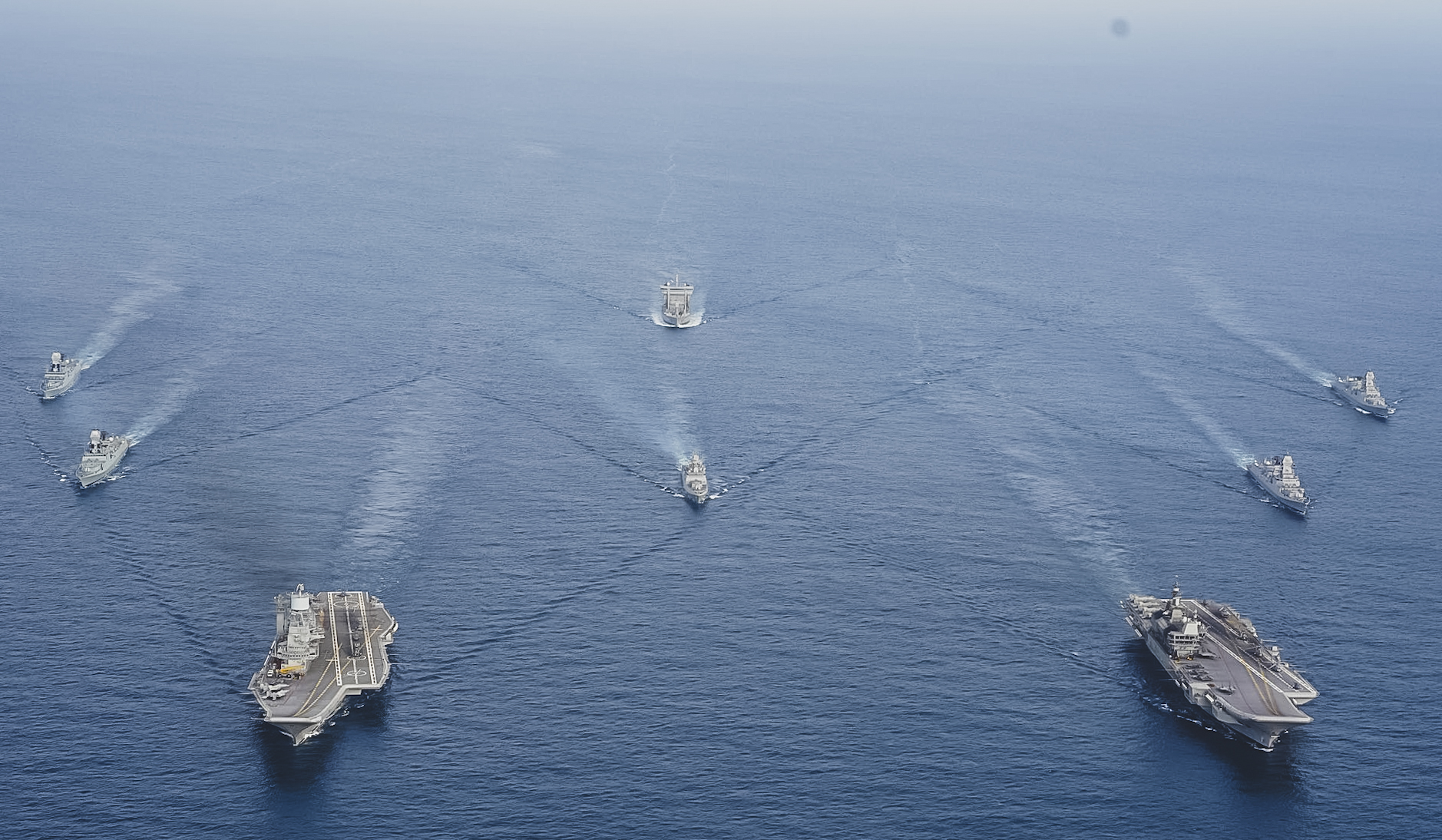
Indian Navy's aircraft carriers INS Vikramaditya (left) and INS Vikrant (right) during a twin-carrier demonstration in the Arabian Sea.

The Indian Navy has operated all types of aircraft carriers including CATOBAR configured Vikrant (1961), STOVL configured Viraat and STOBAR configured Vikramaditya and Vikrant (2013) and CBGs centered on them. The Indian Navy has been operating carrier battle groups since 1961, with its first carrier battle group formed around the now decommissioned Vikrant (1961). Viraat was an updated Centaur-class light carrier originally built for the Royal Navy as HMS Hermes, which was laid down in 1944 and commissioned in 1959. It was purchased by India in May 1987, and was decommissioned in March 2017. India commissioned Vikramaditya in 2013 followed by the new Vikrant (2013) in 2022. Vikramaditya is the modified Kiev-class aircraft carrier Admiral Gorshkov, Vikrant is the first indigenous aircraft carrier built in India. India plans to have three carrier battle groups by 2035, each centered on Vikrant (2013), Vikramaditya and Vishal, another planned carrier. As of 2023, the Indian Navy operates two carrier battle groups centred on Vikramaditya and Vikrant.

The Indian Navy's carrier battle group centred on Viraat consisted of two destroyers, usually of the Delhi class (previously Rajputs), two or more frigates, usually of the Brahmaputra, Godavari or Nilgiri classes, and one support ship.

The Carrier Battle Group (CBG) led by Vikramaditya includes Kolkata-class destroyers, Talwar-class frigates and the support ship INS Deepak among others. While the independent CBG of Vikrant is expected to consist of Visakhapatnam-class destroyers, Nilgiri-class frigates, Kamorta-class corvettes and the support ship INS Shakti.

=== Italy ===
The CVS–ASW (Aircraft Carrier with Anti-Submarine Warfare) Italian aircraft carrier Giuseppe Garibaldi was Italy's first carrier. The battle group based at Taranto called COMFORAL was formed by the carrier Giuseppe Garibaldi, two Durand de la Penne-class destroyers, two support ships (Etna and Elettra), and three amphibious/support ships (San Giusto, San Marco and San Giorgio).

After 2010, the Italian battle group will be formed by the new Cavour, 5–6 new warships (including Orizzonte-class destroyers and frigates), one new support ship, some minehunters and new submarines (the COMFORAL will be a reserve group).

=== Russia ===
Admiral Kuznetsov has been observed sailing together with a Kirov-class battlecruiser (CBGN), Slava-class cruiser (CG), Sovremenny-class destroyer (ASuW), Udaloy-class destroyer (ASW) and Krivak I/II FFG (ASW). During Admiral Kuznetsov's deployment to Syria in November 2016 on her first combat tour, the carrier was escorted by a pair of Udaloy-class destroyers and a Kirov-class battlecruiser en route, while additional Russian Navy warships met her off Syria.

Admiral Kuznetsov is designed specifically to sail alone and carries greater firepower than her U.S. counterparts. This includes 12x SS-N-19 'Shipwreck' (long range, high speed, sea-skimming) SSMs, 24 x VLS units loaded with 192 SA-N-9 'Gauntlet' SAMs, and 8 x Kashtan CIWS with dual 30 mm guns, and 8 × AK-630 CIWS. Compared to the 4 × Phalanx CIWS and 4 × Sea Sparrow launchers, each with 8 missiles carried by the Nimitz class, Admiral Kuznetsov is well armed for both air-defence and offensive operations against hostile shipping.

=== United Kingdom ===
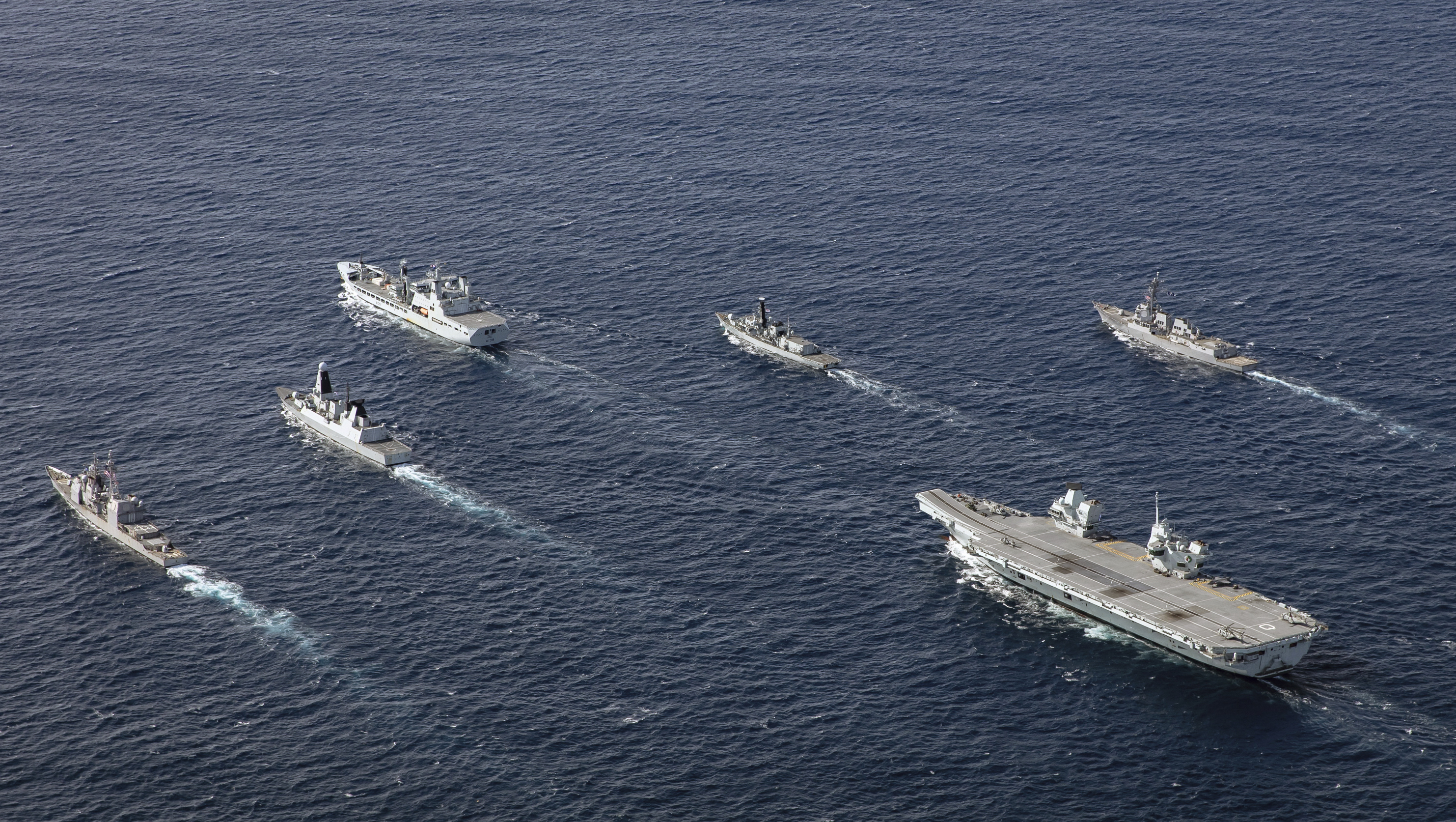
HMS Queen Elizabeth and her Carrier Strike Group during Exercise Westlant 19.

As one of the pioneers of aircraft carriers, the Royal Navy has maintained a carrier strike capability since the commissioning of HMS Argus in 1918. However, the capability was temporarily lost between 2010 and 2018, following the retirement of the Invincible-class aircraft carrier and Harrier GR9s. During this period, the Royal Navy worked to regenerate its carrier strike capability based on the Carrier-Enabled Power Projection (CEPP) concept by ordering two Queen Elizabeth-class aircraft carriers and the F-35B Lightning aircraft to operate from them. To maintain its skills and experience, the Royal Navy embedded personnel and ships with partner navies, in particular the United States Navy.

In 2017, the first Queen Elizabeth-class aircraft carrier, HMS Queen Elizabeth, entered service followed by her sister ship, HMS Prince of Wales, in 2019. The first carrier strike group took to sea in September 2019 as part of an exercise known as Westlant 19. HMS Queen Elizabeth and her air group of F-35B Lightning jets operated alongside two surface escorts and a fleet tanker off the east coast of the United States. The deployment was in preparation for the first operational deployment in 2021, which is expected to involve HMS Queen Elizabeth alongside four Royal Navy escorts, two support ships and a submarine.

Under current plans, a Royal Navy carrier strike group will typically comprise a Queen Elizabeth-class aircraft carrier, two air defence destroyers, two anti-submarine frigates, a submarine, solid stores ship and a fleet tanker. However, the composition varies depending on the operational tasking. While Queen Elizabeth's initial deployment will be as part of an all-British carrier group, it is envisaged in the longer term that the UK's carriers will usually form the centre of a multi-national operation – in 2018, it was announced that the British and Dutch governments had come to an agreement that would see escort vessels of the Royal Netherlands Navy operating as part of the UK Carrier Strike Group. Command of the UK carrier strike group is the responsibility of Commander United Kingdom Carrier Strike Group. A June 2020 National Audit Office report however provided a critical review of the forthcoming Carrier Strike Group, especially noting the delay to the Crowsnest system.

=== United States ===
==== Carrier strike group ====
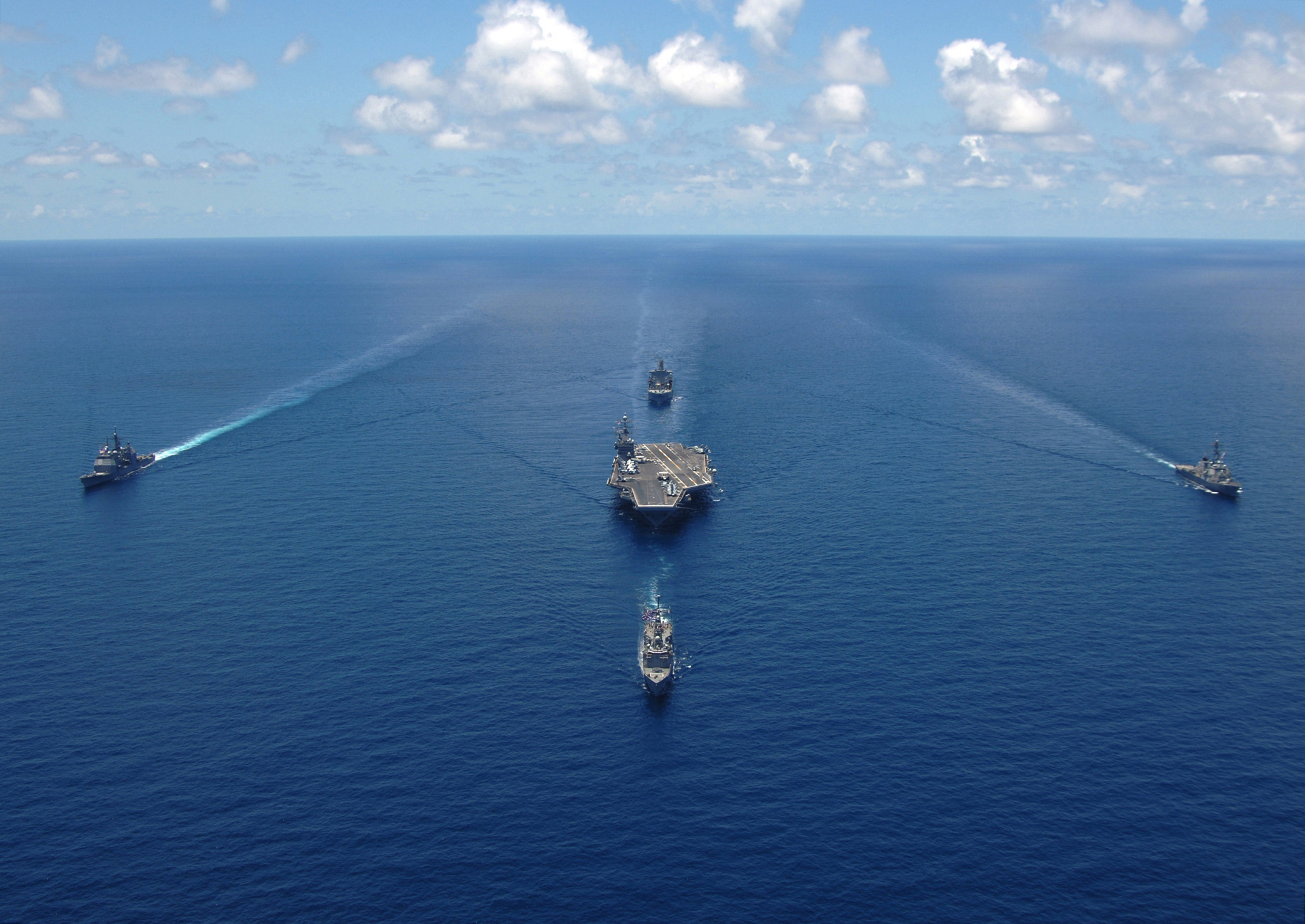
USS George Washington Carrier Strike Group sails in formation for a strike group photo in the Caribbean Sea 29 April 2006. Such a formation, referred to derisively as the "bullseye" formation, would not be used in combat.

In modern United States Navy carrier air operations, a carrier strike group (CSG) normally consists of one aircraft carrier, one guided missile cruiser (for air defense), two LAMPS-capable warships (focusing on anti-submarine and surface warfare), and one to two anti-submarine destroyers or frigates. The large number of CSGs used by the United States reflects, in part, a division of roles and missions allotted during the Cold War, in which the United States assumed primary responsibility for blue-water operations and for safeguarding supply lines between the United States and Europe, while the NATO allies assumed responsibility for less costly brown- and green-water operations. The CSG has replaced the old term of carrier battle group (CVBG or CARBATGRU). The US Navy maintains 11 carrier strike groups, 10 of which are based in the United States and one that is forward deployed in Yokosuka, Japan.

==== Expeditionary strike group ====
An expeditionary strike group is composed of an amphibious assault ship (landing helicopter assault/landing helicopter dock), a dock landing ship, an amphibious transport dock, a Marine expeditionary unit, AV-8B Harrier II or, more the newer Lockheed Martin F-35B Lightning II aircraft, CH-53E Super Stallion and CH-46E Sea Knight helicopters or, more recently, MV-22B tiltrotors. Cruisers, destroyers and attack submarines are deployed with either an Expeditionary Strike Group or a Carrier Strike Group.

==== Battleship battle group ====
During the period when the American navy recommissioned all four of its Iowa-class battleships, it sometimes used a similar formation centered on a battleship, referred to as a battleship battle group. It was alternately referred to as a surface action group. The battleship battle group typically consisted of one modernized battleship, one Ticonderoga-class cruiser, one Kidd-class destroyer or Arleigh Burke-class destroyer, one Spruance-class destroyer, three Oliver Hazard Perry-class frigates and one auxiliary ship such as a replenishment oiler.

==== Surface action group ====
A surface action group is "a temporary or standing organization of combatant ships, other than carriers, tailored for a specific tactical mission".

== Underway replenishment ==
Since its origins, the viability of the carrier battle group has been dependent on its ability to remain at sea for extended periods. Specialized ships were developed to provide underway replenishment of fuel (for the carrier and its aircraft), ordnance, and other supplies necessary to sustain operations. Carrier battle groups devote a great deal of planning to efficiently conduct underway replenishment to minimize the time spent conducting replenishment. The carrier can also provide replenishment on a limited basis to its escorts, but typically a replenishment ship such as a fast combat support ship (AOE) or replenishment oiler (AOR) pulls alongside a carrier and conducts simultaneous operations with the carrier on its port side and one of the escorts on its starboard side. The advent of the helicopter provides the ability to speed replenishment by lifting supplies at the same time that fueling hoses and lines are delivering other goods.

== Debate on future viability ==
There is debate in naval warfare circles as to the viability of carrier battle groups in 21st century naval warfare. Proponents of the CVBG argue that it provides unmatched firepower and force projection capabilities. Opponents argue that CVBGs are increasingly vulnerable to arsenal ships and cruise missiles, especially those with supersonic or even hypersonic flight and the ability to perform radical trajectory changes to avoid anti-missile systems. It is also noted that CVBGs were designed for Cold War scenarios, and are less useful in establishing control of areas close to shore. It is argued however that such missiles and arsenal ships pose no serious threat as they would be eliminated due to increasing improvement in ship defenses such as Cooperative Engagement Capability (CEC), DEW technology and missile technology.

Additionally, carrier battle groups proved to be vulnerable to diesel-electric submarines owned by many smaller naval forces. Examples are the German U24 of the conventional 206 class which in 2001 "sank" USS Enterprise during the exercise JTFEX 01-2 in the Caribbean Sea by firing flares and taking a photograph through its periscope or the Swedish Gotland which managed the same feat in 2006 during JTFEX 06-2 by penetrating the defensive measures of Carrier Strike Group 7 undetected and snap several pictures of USS Ronald Reagan.

However, carriers have been called upon to be first responders even when conventional land-based aircraft were employed. During Desert Shield, the U.S. Navy sortied additional carriers to augment the on-station assets, eventually maintaining six carriers for Desert Storm. Although the U.S. Air Force sent fighters such as the F-16 to theater in Desert Shield, they had to carry bombs with them as no stores were in place for sustained operations, whereas the carriers arrived on scene with full magazines and had support ships to allow them to conduct strikes indefinitely.

The Global War on Terror has shown the flexibility and responsiveness of the carrier on multiple occasions when land-based air was not feasible or able to respond in a timely fashion. After the 11 September terrorist attacks on the U.S., carriers immediately headed to the Arabian Sea to support Operation Enduring Freedom and took up station, building to a force of three carriers. Their steaming location was closer to the targets in Afghanistan than any land-based assets and thereby more responsive. The USS Kitty Hawk was adapted to be a support base for special operations helicopters. Carriers were used again in Operation Iraqi Freedom and even provided aircraft to be based ashore on occasion and have done so periodically when special capabilities are needed. This precedent was established during World War II in the Battle of Guadalcanal.

Regardless of the debate over viability, the United States has made a major investment in the development of a new carrier class—the Gerald R. Ford-class aircraft carriers (formerly designated CVN-X, or the X Carrier)—to replace the existing Nimitz-class aircraft carriers. The new Ford-class carriers are designed to be modular and are easily adaptable as technology and equipment needed on board changes.

== See also ==
- Amphibious ready group
- Naval tactics

== Bibliography ==
- Lightbody, Andy; Poyer, Joe (1990). The Complete Book of U.S. Fighting Power. New York: Crown Publishers. ISBN 978-0-51703-298-5.
- Morua, Michael L. (21 March 2000). "The Carrier Battle Group Force: An Operator's Perspective" (PDF). Engineering the Total Ship (ETS) 2000 Symposium. Gaithersburg, Maryland: National Institute of Standards & Technology. ADA376409. Archived (PDF) from the original on 1 December 2012.
