= Type 903 replenishment ship =

Auxiliary Chinese naval vessel

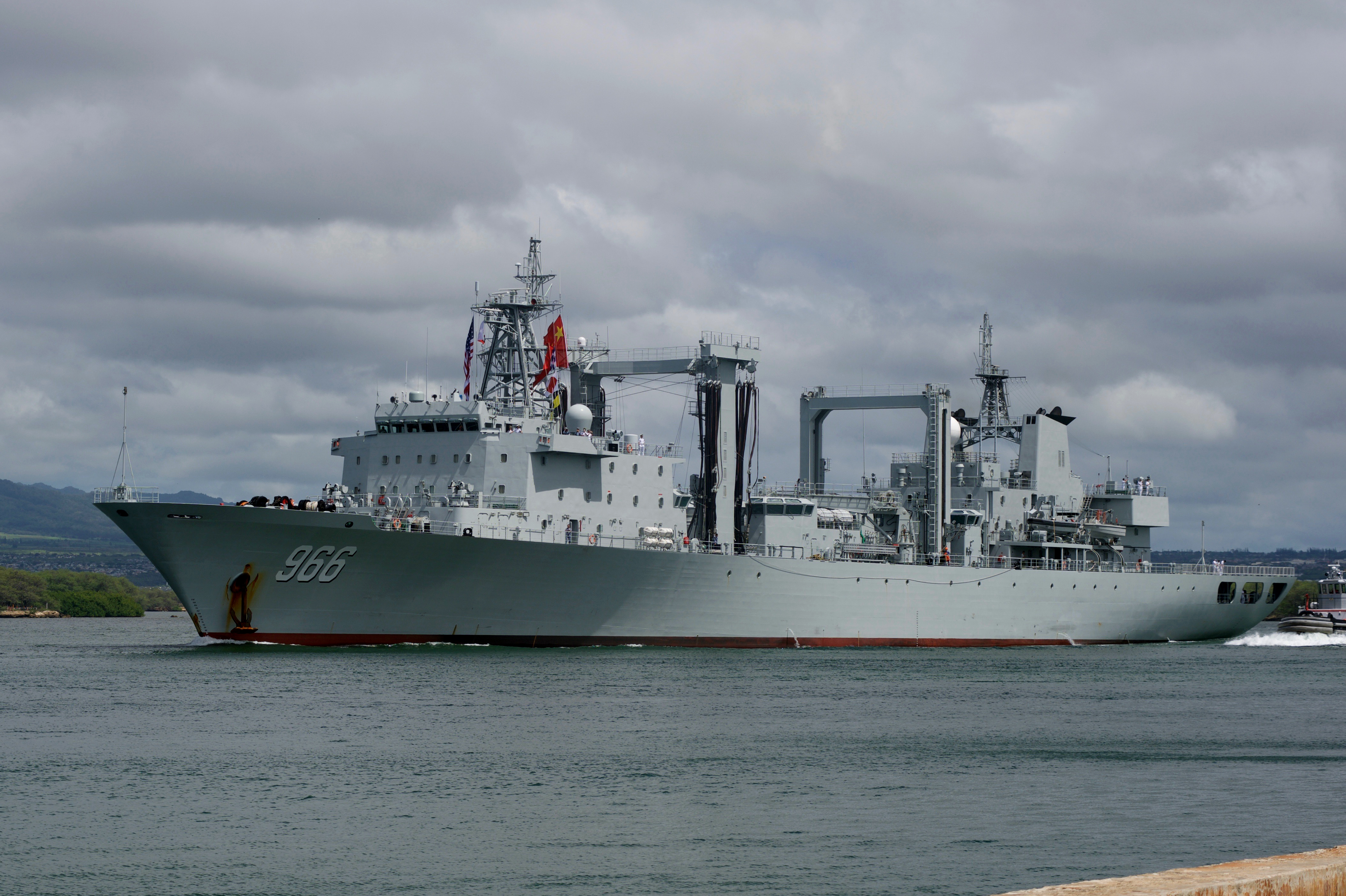
- Gaoyouhu

Class overview
- Builders: CSSC Offshore & Marine Engineering (Group) Company Limited; Hudong-Zhonghua Shipyard
- Operators: People's Liberation Army Navy
- Preceded by: Type 908
- Succeeded by: Type 901
- In commission: 2004
- Building: 3
- Completed: 11
- Active: 11

General characteristics
- Type: Replenishment oiler
- Displacement: 23,369 tons (full load)
- Length: 178.5 m (585 ft 8 in)
- Beam: 24.8 m (81 ft 4 in)
- Draught: 8.7 m (28 ft 7 in)
- Propulsion: 2 x SEMT Pielstick 16PC2 6V400 diesel engines; 2 shafts; Total output: 24,000 hp (18,000 kW)
- Speed: 19 knots (35 km/h; 22 mph)
- Range: 10,000 nmi (19,000 km; 12,000 mi) at 14 knots (26 km/h; 16 mph)
- Capacity: 10,500 tons of fuel oil, 250 tons of fresh water, 680 tons of cargo and ammunition
- Complement: 130
- Armament: 4 × single-barrel 30 mm RCWS or 4 x twin 37 mm guns
- Aircraft carried: 1 Harbin Z-8 or Changhe Z-18
- Aviation facilities: hangar and flight deck

The Type 903 combined replenishment ship (Chinese: 903型综合补给舰, NATO reporting name: Fuchi) is a class of replenishment oiler (AOR) built for the People's Liberation Army Navy, serving as a principal fleet auxiliary ship for blue-water expeditionary missions by the People's Republic of China. They resemble HTMS Similan, an AOR built by China for Thailand delivered in 1996.

Two original-design Type 903s entered service in 2003. Construction of the Type 903A (NATO reporting name: Fuchi II), a slightly modified design, began in 2010; the first Type 903As entered service in 2013. As of April 2026, a total of eleven ships are currently in service.

== Development ==
According to Zhang Gang, chief designer of Similan, China started development of a new AOR in 1988. Development was delayed due to cost, leading China to buy a Komandarm Fedko-class oiler, renamed Qinghaihu, from Ukraine in 1992. The new design was completed for Similan, which became the basis for the Type 903.

== Design ==
The Type 903 is a flush-decked development of the Type 905 AOR resembling the French Durance class.

There are two liquid and one sliding-stay solid transfer stations per side. Refuelling may also be conducted from the stern.

== Ships of the class ==
Name	Hull No.	Builder	Launched	Commissioned	Fleet	Status
Type 903
千岛湖 / Qiandaohu (ex-Fuchi)	886	Hudong Shipyard	29 March 2003	30 April 2004	East Sea Fleet	Active
微山湖 / Weishanhu	887	Guangzhou Shipyard International	June 2003	2004	South Sea Fleet	Active
Type 903A
太湖 / Taihu	889	Guangzhou Shipyard International	22 March 2012	18 June 2013	North Sea Fleet	Active
巢湖 / Chaohu	890	Hudong Shipyard	6 May 2012	11 September 2013	East Sea Fleet	Active
东平湖 / Dongpinghu	902(Ex-960)					Active
洪湖 / Honghu	906(Ex-963)					Active
骆马湖 / Luomahu	907(Ex-964)					Active
高邮湖 / Gaoyouhu	904(Ex-966)					Active
可可西里湖 / Kekexilihu	903(Ex-968)					Active
	892					Active
	893					Active

== Gallery ==
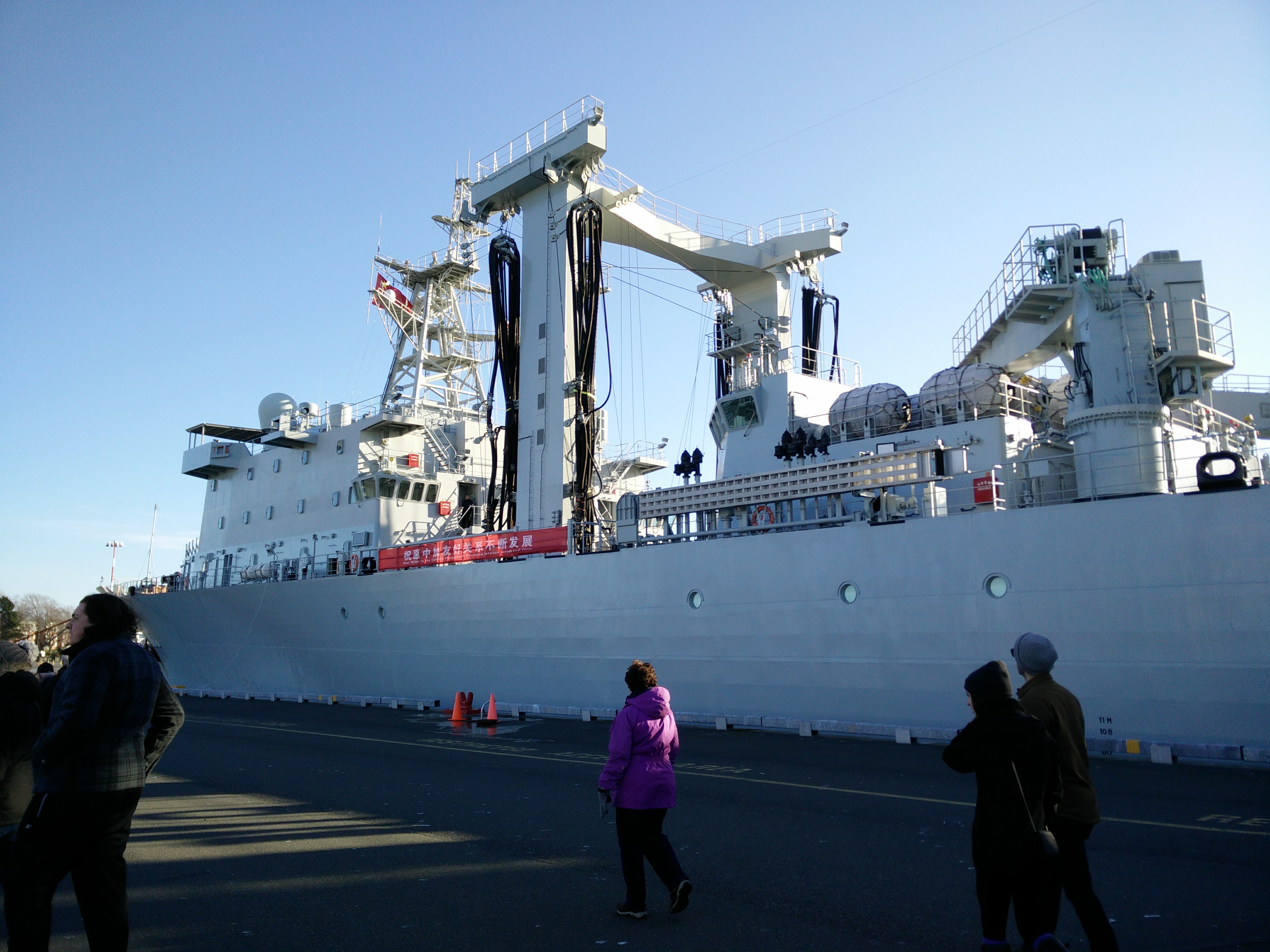
Taihu at Victoria, Canada.

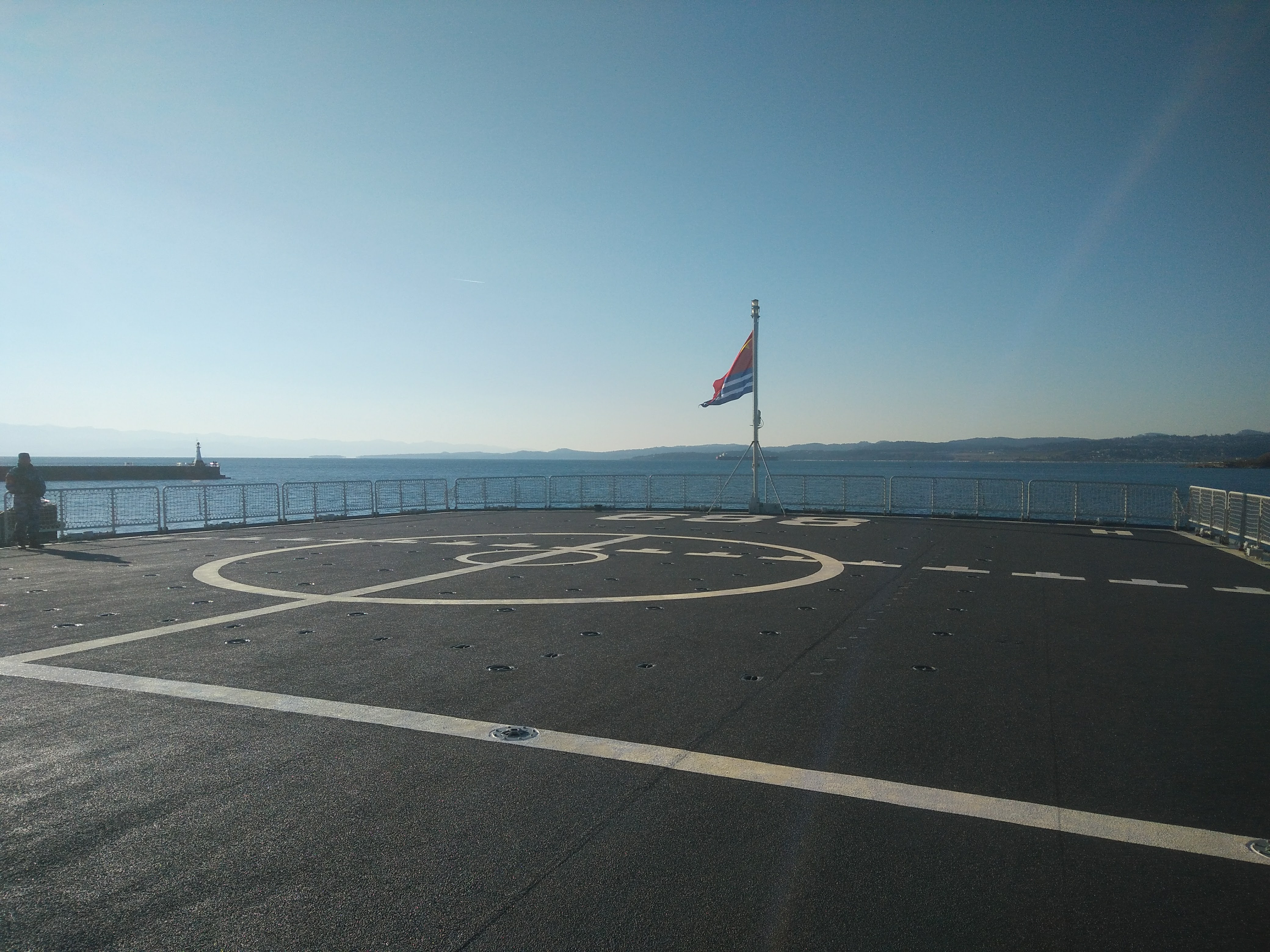
Flight deck of Taihu.

== Sources ==
- Saunders, Stephan, ed. (2015). Jane's Fighting Ships 2015-2016. Jane's Information Group. ISBN 978-0710631435.
- Sheldon-Duplaix, Alexandre (2017). "China's Auxiliary Fleet: Supporting a Blue-Water Navy in the Far Seas?". China's Evolving Surface Fleet. CSMI Red Book. Vol. 14. United States Naval War College. ISBN 978-1-935352-45-7.
- Wertheim, Eric (2013). The Naval Institute Guide to Combat Fleets of the World: Their Ships, Aircraft, and Systems (16 ed.). Annapolis, Maryland: Naval Institute Press. ISBN 978-1591149545.
