= USS Camden =

USS Camden has been the name of two ships in the United States Navy:

- USS Camden (AS-6), the former Kiel, served as a submarine tender from 1919 to 1931, then as a barracks ship during World War II.
- USS Camden (AOE-2), a fast combat support ship, 1967–2005.
