= Supply-class fast combat support ship =

Class of United States Navy logistics ships

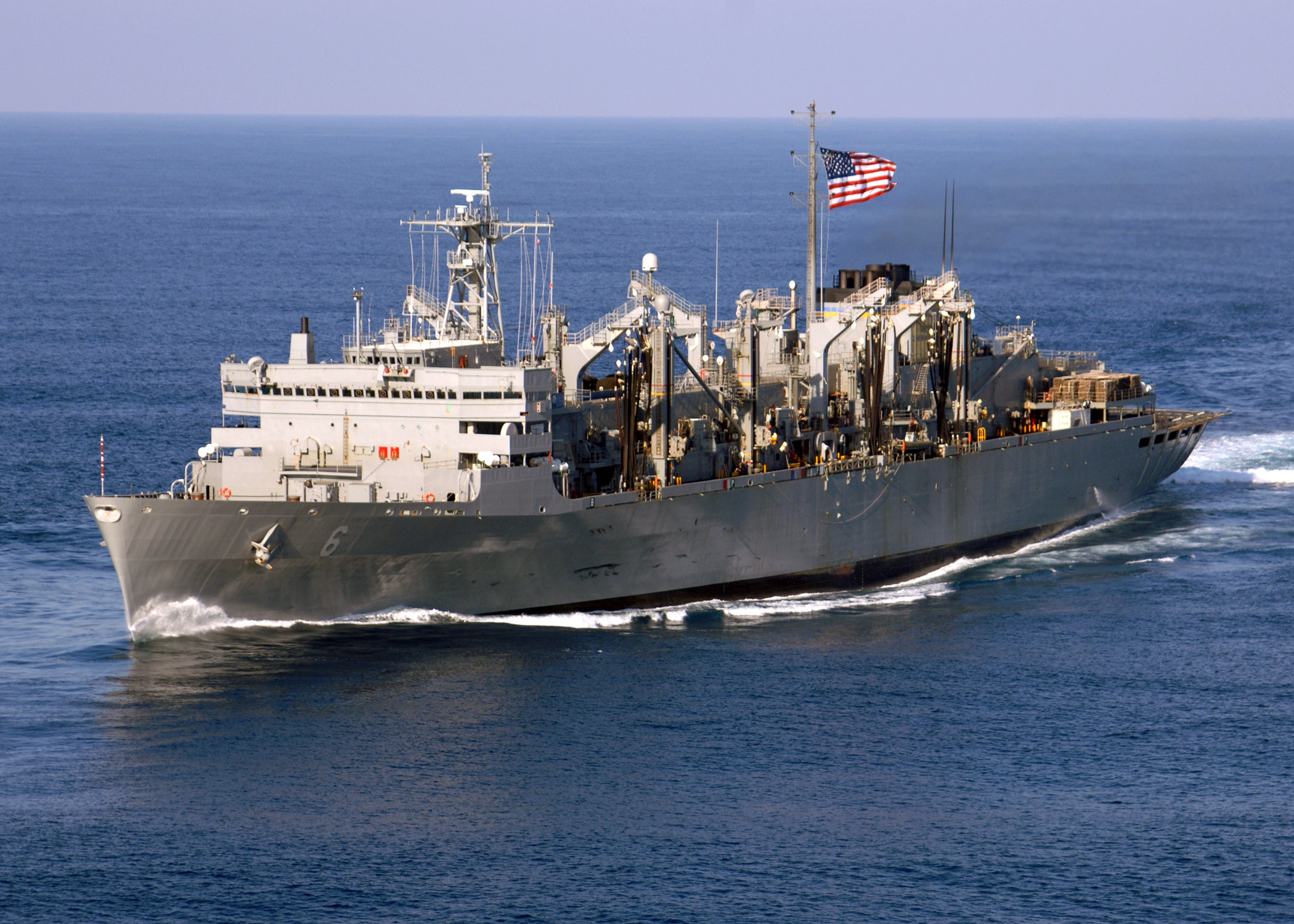
- USNS Supply in 2006

Class overview
- Builders: National Steel and Shipbuilding Company, San Diego, California
- Operators: United States Navy
- Preceded by: Sacramento class
- Built: 1989-1998
- In service: 1994-Present
- In commission: 1994-2004
- Planned: 4
- Completed: 4
- Active: 2
- Laid up: 2
- Retired: 0

General characteristics
- Type: Fast combat support ship
- Displacement: 48,800 long tons (49,600 t)
- Length: 754 ft (229.8 m) (overall)
- Beam: 107 ft (32.6 m) (extreme beam)
- Draft: 39 ft (11.9 m)
- Installed power: 105,000 hp (78 MW)
- Propulsion: four General Electric LM 2500 gas turbine engines, Two Propellers
- Speed: 25 knots (46 km/h)
- Armament: Multiple .50-caliber machine guns; Small arms
- Aircraft carried: Two CH-46E Sea Knight or MH-60S Seahawk helicopters

The Supply-class fast combat support ships are a class of four United States Navy supply ships used to refuel, rearm, and restock ships in the United States Navy in both the Atlantic and Pacific Oceans.

These are the only US Navy resupply ships able to keep up with the strike groups, but due to their cost to operate the Navy announced intentions to retire them starting in 2014, however as of 2026 only two of the ships, Rainier and Bridge, have been decommissioned and stricken from the register. The Supply-class ships are built to military combatant standards and are shock hardened.

As of early 2023, USNS Rainier and USNS Bridge have been taken out of service and struck. Along with the remaining two Supply-class ships, US Navy fleets are currently supplied by Lewis and Clark-class dry cargo ships as well as Henry J. Kaiser-class and John Lewis-class replenishment oilers.

== Ships ==
Ship	Hull No.	Builder	Commissioning– Decommissioning	NVR Page	Status
Supply	T-AOE-6	National Steel and Shipbuilding Company, San Diego, CA	1994–2001 (Transferred to MSC)	T-AOE-6	Active
Rainier	T-AOE-7	National Steel and Shipbuilding Company, San Diego, CA	1995–2003 (Transferred to MSC)	AOE-7	Stricken
Arctic	T-AOE-8	National Steel and Shipbuilding Company, San Diego, CA	1995–2002 (Transferred to MSC)	T-AOE-8	Active
Bridge	T-AOE-10	National Steel and Shipbuilding Company, San Diego, CA	1998–2004 (Transferred to MSC)	AOE-10	Stricken

== General characteristics ==
- Displacement: 19,700 tons (empty), 49,000 tons (full)
- Length: 754 ft (229.8 m) (overall)
- Beam: 107 ft (32.6 m) (extreme beam)
- Draft: 39 ft (11.9 m)
- Export power: 78.33MW
- Maximum speed: 25 knots
- Range 6,000 nm
- Complement 40 officers + 667 enlisted (USN), 176 civilians, 30-45 military (MSC)
- Propulsion: 4 x General Electric LM2500

Cargo capacity

- Diesel Fuel Marine (DFM): 1,965,600 US gallons (7,441,000 L)
- JP-5 fuel: 2,620,800 US gallons (9,921,000 L)
- Bottled gas: 800 bottles
- Ordnance stowage: 2,150 short tons (1,950 t)
- Chill and freeze stowage: 250 short tons (230 t)
- Water: 20,000 US gallons (76,000 L)
