= Fast combat support ship =

Combat logistics ship

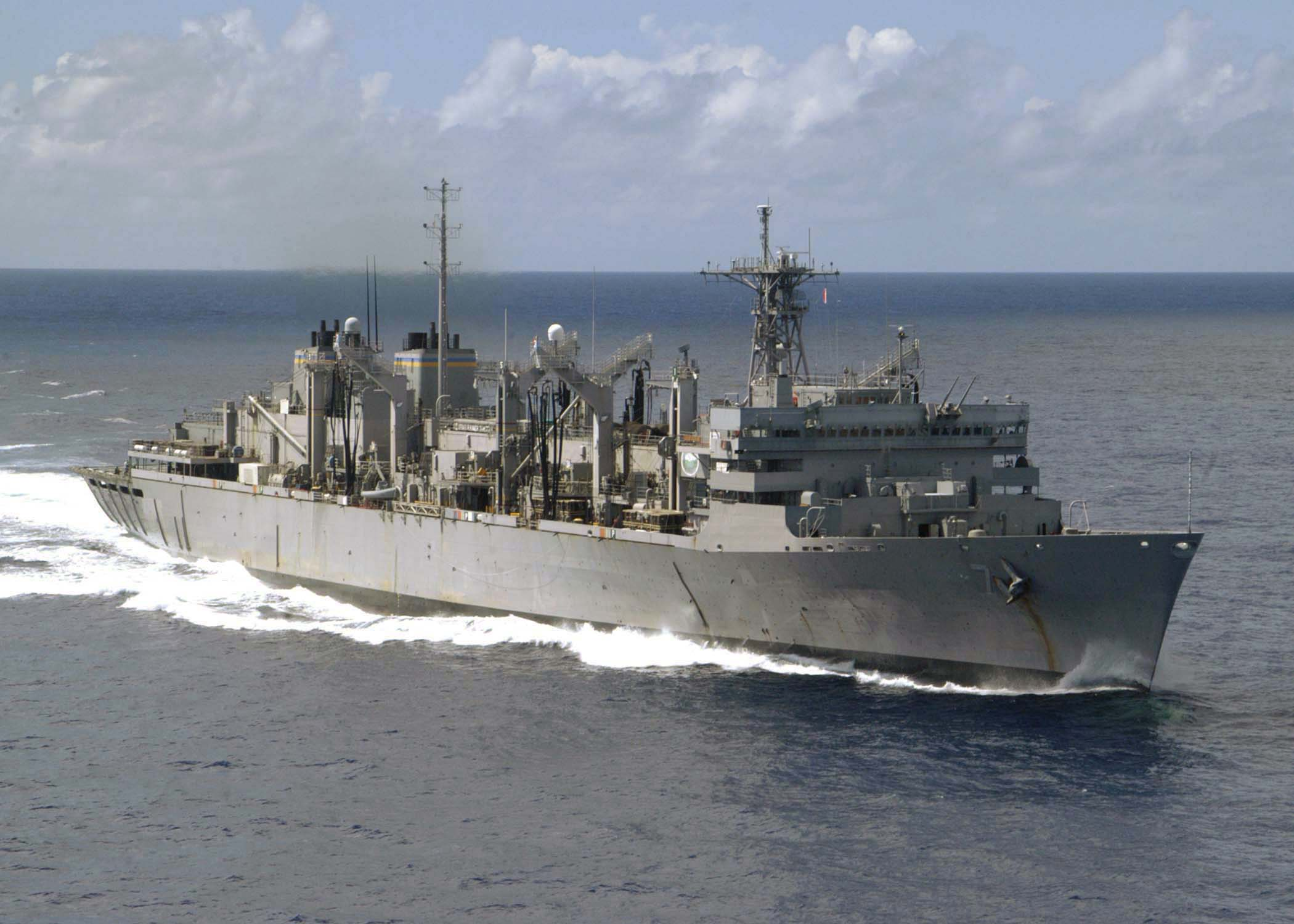
The fast combat support ship USNS Rainier (T-AOE-7), underway in the Western Pacific, circa 2004

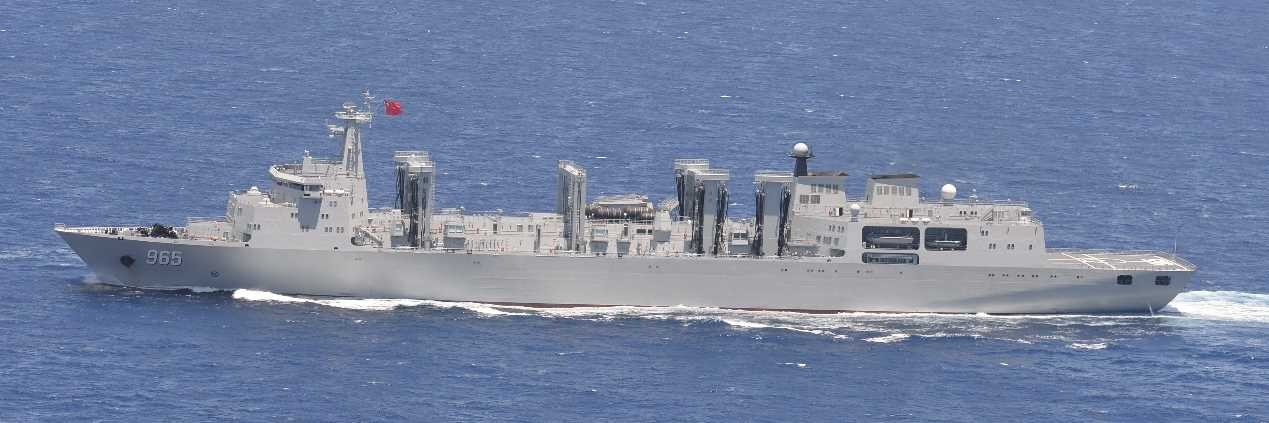
Chinese PLAN fast combat support ship Hulunhu (965) in the Pacific Ocean

The fast combat support ship (US Navy hull classification symbol: AOE) is a type of replenishment auxiliary ship. Different from traditional logistic ships, the fast combat support ship is designed with high speed to keep up with the carrier battle group/carrier strike group, while the multi-product station is capable of supplying all types of necessities for the fleet.

== History ==
=== US Navy ===
The fast combat support ship is designed to perform the functions of three old logistic ship types in one hull - fleet oiler (AO), ammunition ship (AE), and refrigerated stores ship (AF). Aside from supplying ships, fast combat support ships need the speed, weapons, sensors, and communications equipment, to serve as an integrated component of the carrier strike battle group. The concept of fast combat support ship was envisioned by United States Navy admiral Arleigh Burke, who laid out the concept as the solution to logistics problems he encountered in World War II.

The first class of the fast combat support ship was the Sacramento-class, built with multi-product supply stations, the largest fuel capacity, and the largest ammunition capacity in the US Navy at the time. The four ships of the Sacramento-class were 53,000 tons at full load, 796 feet overall length, and carried two Boeing Vertol CH-46 Sea Knight helicopters. The Sacramento-class was retired in 2005.

After replacing the Sacramento-class, the Supply-class became the largest combat logistics ship in the United States. They can carry more than 177,000 barrels of oil, 2,150 tons of ammunition, 500 tons of dry stores, and 250 tons of refrigerated stores. They receive petroleum products, ammunition, and stores from various shuttle ships and redistributes these items when needed to ships in the carrier strike group. This greatly reduces the number of service ships needed to travel with carrier strike groups. The ships of the class displaced 48,800 tons full load and carried two Boeing Vertol CH-46 Sea Knight or two Sikorsky MH-60S Knighthawk helicopters.

Air defense includes the RIM-7 Sea Sparrow radar and infrared surface-to-air missile in eight-cell launchers to provide point defense with 15km to 25km range. There are also two 20mm Phalanx CIWS (close-in weapon systems) and two Mk38 25mm cannons. All Supply-class combat support ships were commissioned until 2001, and then were transferred to Military Sealift Command.

A program to replace the Supply-class ships, the" T-AOE(X) station-ship replacement project", was cancelled in 2005 by US Defense Secretary Donald Rumsfeld.

As of early 2023, USNS Rainier and USNS Bridge have been taken out of service and struck. Along with the remaining two Supply-class ships, US Navy fleets are currently supplied by Lewis and Clark-class dry cargo ships as well as Henry J. Kaiser-class and John Lewis-class replenishment oilers.

=== PLA Navy ===
In the 21st century, China also developed the Type 901 fast combat support ship, which serves a similar mission in their navy.

== Lists of fast combat support ships ==
=== United States ===
- List of United States Navy oilers § Fast Combat Support Ships (AOE)

=== China ===
- Type 901 fast combat support ship § Ships of the class

== See also ==
- List of Military Sealift Command ships
