= COMEC (company) =

Chinese state-owned shipbuilding company

Coordinates: 23.072053°N 113.251255°E

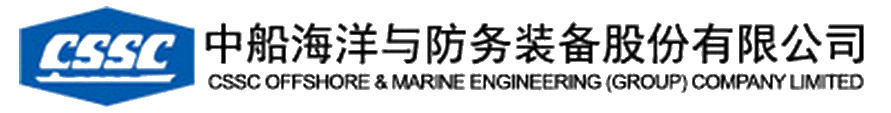
- Native name: 中船海洋与防务装备股份有限公司（中船防务）
- Company type: State-owned; public
- Traded as: SEHK: 317, SSE: 600685
- Industry: Shipbuilding and Ship repairing
- Founded: 1954
- Headquarters: Guangzhou, Guangdong, China
- Area served: Worldwide
- Key people: Li Zhushi (Chairman)
- Parent: China State Shipbuilding Corporation
- Website: comec.cssc.net.cn

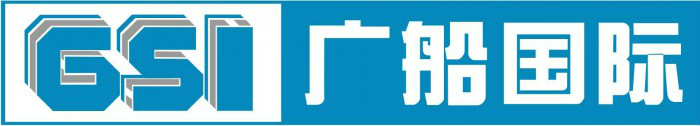
Former logo as Guangzhou Shipyard International (GSI)

CSSC Offshore & Marine Engineering (Group) Company Limited (COMEC), formerly Guangzhou Shipyard International Company Limited (GSI), is the largest modern integrated state-owned shipbuilding enterprise based in Southern China.

== History ==
It was founded in 1954 and is parented by China State Shipbuilding Corporation (CSSC). It was reorganized and issued H share in Hong Kong Stock Exchange and A-share in Shanghai Stock Exchange in 1993 respectively. It is also the only shipbuilding stock listed in Hong Kong.

== Operation ==
It is engaged in the construction and trading of vessels; manufacturing and trading of steel structure and mechanical and electrical equipment, container transportation services and ship repair services. It has shipyards in Guangzhou and Foshan in Guangdong Province respectively. Its Chairman is Li Zhushi.

Benefited by Chinese central government Eleventh Five-Year Plan and international flourishing shipbuilding market, the company has seen many-fold net profit rise since 2006.
