= Freedom of navigation =

International maritime legal concept

Freedom of navigation (FON) is a principle of law of the sea that ships flying the flag of any sovereign state should not suffer interference from other states when in international waters, apart from the exceptions provided for in international law. In the realm of international law, it has been defined as “freedom of movement for vessels, freedom to enter ports and to make use of plant and docks, to load and unload goods and to transport goods and passengers". This right is now also codified as Article 87(1)a of the 1982 United Nations Convention on the Law of the Sea.

== History ==
In both Roman law and Islamic law, notions of a commonality of the seas were firmly established. However, in practice, Romans, Europeans, and Muslim states did claim jurisdiction over the sea.

=== Development as a legal concept ===
Freedom of navigation as a legal and normative concept has developed only relatively recently. Until the early modern period, international maritime law was governed by customs that differed across countries’ legal systems and were only sometimes codified, as for example in the 14th-century Crown of Aragon Consulate of the Sea (Spanish: Consulado del mar; Italian: Consolato del mare; also known in English as the Customs of the Sea). These customs were developed and employed in local jurisprudence, often cases in prize courts regarding the capture of goods on the high seas by privateers. Under the Consolato customs (and other contemporary codes), "enemy goods can be captured on neutral ships and neutral goods are free on board enemy's ships." This established a framework under which neutral shipping was not inviolable in time of war, meaning navies were free to attack ships of any nation on the open seas, however the goods belonging to neutral countries on those ships, even if they were enemy ships, were not to be taken. This legal custom, which hereafter will be referred to as the consolato rule, was long observed by England (later Great Britain), France, and Spain, as major naval powers.

New theories about how to run the maritime world, however, started to emerge as time went on and maritime trade, travel, and conquest by the great European naval forces began to stretch beyond of European waterways.Two main schools of thought emerged in the 17th century. The first, championed most famously by John Selden, promoted the concept of mare clausum, which held that states could limit or even close off seas or maritime areas to access by any or all foreign ships, just as areas of land could be owned by a state, limiting foreign activity there. Other notable supporters of this idea included John Burroughs and William Welwod. In the larger geopolitical context, mare clausum was backed by the major naval and colonial powers of the day, including Spain and Portugal. As these powers extended their reach to the New World and across Africa and Asia, they wished to consolidate control over their new empires and access to trade and resources there by denying other countries access to the sea routes leading to these areas. By quite literally closing off access to the seas using their naval muscle, these states would profit handsomely from the growing maritime trade routes and foreign colonies.

Meanwhile, the Dutch Republic, the dominant European trade carrier, championed a different rule, known as mare liberum (free seas), summarized as "a free ship [makes] free goods." This meant that even enemy goods, always excepting contraband, were inviolate in neutral bottoms (i.e. hulls), making neutral ships off-limits for attack on the high seas. For the Dutch Republic, this was essential in order to secure the safety and viability of their extensive trade network. This concept was coined by Hugo Grotius, a Dutch jurist and a founding father of international law. Grotius advocated for a shift in maritime norms that would make the high seas free for transport and shipping, regardless of the country of origin of the ship. This would represent not only a change in law, but also a fundamental shift in the perception of the maritime realm as something not to be owned, as land is, but rather as a shared resource. Behind this concept is a liberal view of sovereign equality, in which all states have equal access to the high seas, and a view of an interdependent world connected by the sea.

As the dominant naval powers of Spain and Portugal weakened, and international trade increased, Grotius’ mare liberum concept would come to be the accepted custom governing sovereignty at sea.

=== From concept to custom to law ===
Freedom of navigation came to be embodied in bilateral treaties to become part of what would today be called international law. The earliest example of such a treaty is one concluded between King Henry IV of France and the Ottoman Porte in 1609, followed in 1612 by one between the Porte and the Dutch Republic. Once the Eighty Years' War between Spain and the Dutch Republic had ended during which Spain defended their claim of sovereignty over the oceans against the Dutch claim of "freedom of the high seas," as developed in Hugo Grotius' Mare Liberum, the two concluded a treaty of commerce in which "free ship, free goods" was enshrined. The Dutch Republic subsequently concluded bilateral treaties with most other European countries, containing the "free ship, free goods" principle, sometimes resorting to the use of force to obtain that concession, as against England in the Treaty of Breda (1667) and again in the Treaty of Westminster (1674). England, however, also held fast to the consolato rule in relations with other countries, as did France, until in 1744 it relented and extended the privilege to the neutral Dutch.

The Dutch eventually established a web of bilateral treaties that extended the privilege of "freedom of navigation" to their ships through much of Europe. During the many 18th-century European wars they remained neutral, serving all belligerents with their shipping services. Great Britain, in particular, chafed under the arrangement, as it was the dominant naval power in the 18th century, and the Dutch privilege undermined the effectiveness of its naval blockades. Matters came to a head during the American Revolutionary War, when the Dutch, shielded by the 1674 Anglo-Dutch treaty, supplied both the Americans and the French. The British made extensive use of their "right of search" of Dutch ships, which led to the affair of Fielding and Bylandt in which a Royal Navy squadron detained a Dutch merchant convoy.

Soon afterward, the North ministry abrogated the 1674 treaty, which might have meant the end of the "free ship, free goods" doctrine, but Empress Catherine II of Russia had taken up the torch around the same time. In March 1780, she published a manifesto in which (among other things) she claimed the "free ship, free goods" principle, as a fundamental right of neutral states. To defend that principle, she formed the First League of Armed Neutrality to which the Dutch adhered at the end of the year (which sparked the Fourth Anglo-Dutch War). The principles from her manifesto were soon adhered to by the members of the League and by France, Spain and the new American Republic also (even if, as belligerents, they could not become members of the League).

Nevertheless, as a principle of international law (apart from treaty law) "free ship, free goods" was soon again overturned by the practice of both sides in the French Revolutionary Wars of the turn of the 19th century. For instance, in the jurisprudence of the American courts of the early 19th-century, the consolato principle was universally applied in cases not covered by treaties. On the other hand, the US government made it a steadfast practice to enshrine the "free ship, free goods" principle in the treaties of amity and commerce it concluded with other countries (starting with the 1778 one with France and the 1782 one with the Dutch Republic).

In other words, the American view (following the British practice) was that at that time consolato was customary international law, which, however, could be superseded by treaty law on a bilateral basis. The US, however, earnestly strove for the substitution of consolato by "free ship" in customary law also.

That state of affairs came about when Britain finally gave up its resistance to the principles, first formulated by Empress Catherine in 1780, and acquiesced in the 1856 Paris Declaration Respecting Maritime Law, which enshrined "free ship makes free goods" and rejecting "enemy ship makes enemy goods." The Declaration was signed by the major powers (except the US) and it was soon adhered to by most other powers. The new rule (a combination of the "best" parts of Consolato and "free ship") became that a "neutral flag covers enemy's goods (except contraband); neutral goods are not liable to seizure under the enemy's flag."

While the concept as a whole became accepted international custom and law, the practice and implementation of freedom of navigation would during these years be developed through local jurisprudence and political decision-making. While local jurisprudence differed, usually a consensus view emerged over time. A key example is the issue of territorial waters. While there was agreement that a certain expanse of the seas from a state's shorelines would be under stricter state control than the high seas, the exact distance this control would extend from the shoreline was debated. However, over time through local governance and jurisprudence a general agreement emerged that territorial waters would extend three leagues or three miles from the shoreline. This norm- and custom-formation continued for centuries within the frame of mare liberum.

=== The UNCLOS and the modern understanding of freedom of navigation in international law ===
This culminated in 1982, when freedom of navigation became part of the broader body of laws of the sea currently embodied in the United Nations Convention on the Law of the Sea (UNCLOS). Article 87 of this convention explicitly codifies this concept, stating “The high seas are open to all States, whether coastal or land-locked” and lists “freedom of navigation” as the first of several rights for all states on the high seas. The drafting of UNCLOS clearly was in line with Grotius’ ideas of sovereign equality and international interdependence. All states were given a voice in the drafting of the convention, and the convention only came into effect with the consent and ratification of the party states. Implementation of UNCLOS connects the party states together across the shared space of the high seas.

Freedom of navigation as formulated in the UNCLOS, was a trade-off between the developed and the developing world. Where the developed world had an interest in maximizing their freedom to sail and explore the seas, the developing world wanted to protect their offshore resources and their independence. In other words, it was a conflict between understanding the seas through the principle of mare liberum that asserts the oceans to be open to all nations or mare clausum that advocates that the seas should be under the sovereignty of a state. The UNCLOS upheld freedom of navigation on the high seas but also invented different zones of sovereignty that limited the rules of foreign ships in these waters with concepts like internal waters and exclusive economic zones (EEZ). Additionally, navigation rights of warships were guaranteed on the high seas with complete immunity from the jurisdiction of any state other than the flag state.

The UNCLOS introduced a number of legal concepts that allowed freedom of navigation within and outside of the maritime jurisdictions of countries. These are right of innocent passage, right of transit passage, right of archipelagic sea lanes passage and freedom of the high seas. The right of innocent passage allows ships to travel in other countries' territorial seas if it is not prejudicial to the peace, good order or security of the coastal state. However, some countries like China requires warships to attain prior authorization before they enter Chinese national waters. Transit passage refers to passage through straits used for international navigation between one part of the high seas or an EEZ and another with more relaxed criteria for passage. The passage must be continuous and expeditious transit of the strait. With archipelagic sea lanes passage archipelagic states may provide sea-lanes and air-routes passage though their waters where ships can enjoy freedom of navigation.

=== American adherence to freedom of navigation ===
American advocacy for freedom of navigation extends as far back as the United States' 1778 treaty with France, enshrining freedom of navigation as a legal custom on a bilateral level. In the 20th century, Woodrow Wilson advocated for freedom of navigation, making it Point 2 of his Fourteen Points (see Freedom of the seas). The US has not ratified the 1982 UNCLOS treaty, but it is a party to the preceding 1958 Convention on the High Seas. Despite its failure to formally ratify UNCLOS, the US now considers UNCLOS to be part of customary international law, and has committed to adhering to and enforcing the law.

=== Current developments ===
Support for freedom of navigation has been endorsed by 51 nations in relation to restrictions on shipping operations in the Strait of Hormuz.

== Freedom of navigation operations ==
Freedom of navigation operations (FONOPs) are closely linked to the concept of freedom of navigation, and in particular to the enforcement of relevant international law and customs regarding freedom of navigation. The drafting of UNCLOS was driven in part by states' concerns that strong national maritime interests could lead to excessive maritime claims over coastal seas, which could threaten freedom of navigation. FONOPs are a method of enforcing UNCLOS and avoiding these negative outcomes by reinforcing freedom of navigation through practice, using ships to sail through all areas of the sea permitted under UNCLOS, and in particular those areas that states have attempted to close off to free navigation as defined under UNCLOS and international law and custom.

FONOPs are a modern operational reinforcement of a norm that has been strengthening for nearly four hundred years. Freedom of navigation has been practiced, refined, codified, and accepted as international law under UNCLOS. FONOPs are outgrowths of this development of international law, based on sovereign equality and international interdependence.

=== United States Freedom of Navigation Program ===
The US Department of Defense defines FONOPs as "operational challenges against excessive maritime claims" through which "the United States demonstrates its resistance to excessive maritime claims". The United States has an institutionalized FONOPs program called the Freedom of Navigation Program, which undertakes many FONOPs around the world every year. The program publishes annual reports chronicling each year's FONOPs, and a listing of relevant foreign maritime claims.

The United States Freedom of Navigation (FON) Program was formally established under President Jimmy Carter in 1979. The program was reaffirmed by the administration of Ronald Reagan in 1983 in its Ocean Policy Statement. The Program has continued under all successive administrations since.

The FON Program challenges what the U.S. considers to be excessive territorial claims on the world's oceans and airspace. The position of the United States is that all nations must obey the international law of the sea, as codified in the United Nations Convention on the Law of the Sea. The U.S. Department of State writes:

U.S. policy since 1983 provides that the United States will exercise and assert its navigation and overflight rights and freedoms on a worldwide basis in a manner that is consistent with the balance of interests reflected in the Law of the Sea (LOS) Convention. The United States will not, however, acquiesce in unilateral acts of other states designed to restrict the rights and freedoms of the international community in navigation and overflight and other related high seas uses. The FON Program since 1979 has highlighted the navigation provisions of the LOS Convention to further the recognition of the vital national need to protect maritime rights throughout the world. The FON Program operates on a triple track, involving not only diplomatic representations and operational assertions by U.S. military units, but also bilateral and multilateral consultations with other governments in an effort to promote maritime stability and consistency with international law, stressing the need for and obligation of all States to adhere to the customary international law rules and practices reflected in the LOS Convention.

U.S. armed forces have conducted FONOPs in areas claimed by other countries but considered by the U.S. to be international waters, such as naval operations in the Gulf of Sidra in the 1980s; as well as in strategically important straits (such as Gibraltar, Hormuz, and Malacca).

One of the notable operations conducted as innocent passage and part of Freedom of Navigation program was performed by USS Yorktown, during which, on February 12, 1988, she was "nudged" by the Soviet frigate Bezzavetnyy in an attempt to divert the vessel out of Soviet territorial waters.

=== Freedom of navigation and warships ===
A particular characteristic of many FONOPs, and in particular American FONOPs, is that they are undertaken by vessels of a national navy. This brings to the fore a hot debate over whether freedom of navigation extends to military vessels. Most notably, Chinese legal scholars and government policymakers argue that the right of freedom of navigation given to civilian vessels in foreign waters does not apply to military vessels. Because of this, some countries including China require warships to attain prior authorization before they enter their national waters. They view FONOPs undertaken with military vessels as provocative. Other scholars have pointed out that the UNCLOS does not specifically mention freedom of navigation for warships outside of the high seas but that it has been practice between states to accept military activities at least within the EEZ.

=== Innocent passage versus FONOPs ===
The concept of innocent passage in international law and under UNCLOS refers as noted earlier to the right of a vessel to pass through the territorial waters of a foreign state under certain conditions. While related to FONOPs in that both innocent passages and FONOPs involve vessels traversing seas claimed by a foreign state, they differ in that if a vessel claims it is traversing under innocent passage terms, it implies a concession that the vessel is in fact traveling through territorial waters of another state. Both innocent passage and FONOPs challenge a state's imposed limitations on freedom of navigation in a maritime area, but innocent passage accepts that the area is within a state's waters, while a FONOP can be used to challenge a state's territorial claim to an area.

=== Criticism ===
There are many critics of FONOPs, with a wide breadth of criticisms regarding the efficacy, bellicosity, and legality of FONOPs. One group of critics argues that FONOPs are unnecessarily risky and lead to escalation. Chinese government responses to American FONOPs in the South China Sea fall under this category of criticism. A second group of critics argue that FONOPs are unnecessary, and that states should focus on the protection of their own ships rather than using ship operations to check other states' maritime claims. Still other critics argue that FONOPs are not persuasively communicated or are otherwise ineffective at their goal of limiting other states’ maritime claims.

=== FONOPs in the South China Sea ===
Chinese territorial claims (red line), 2010s

According to BBC correspondents, the Spratly Islands in the South China Sea could potentially be a major geopolitical flashpoint. China has used land reclamation to expand disputed islands, and has built runways on them.

==== U.S. FONOPS in the South China Sea ====
In 2013 and 2014, the US conducted FONOPs in areas claimed by China, Taiwan, Malaysia, the Philippines, and Vietnam. During the presidency of the Obama administration there was an increase in attention on China and Asia in general leading to the pivot to Asia from 2012. This also was reflected in an increased number of FONOPs in the South China Sea. In 2015 the Obama administration authorized two FONOPs and three FONOPs were authorized in 2016. Several of the FONOPs that got most media coverage were the missions conducted by the guided-missile destroyers USS Lassen in 2015; and USS Curtis Wilbur and USS William P. Lawrence in 2016.

In May 2015, the Wall Street Journal reported that the "US Navy regularly conducts freedom of navigation transits in the region ... [but] has yet to receive explicit authorization from the administration to do so within 12 nautical miles of the artificial islands." On May 13, 2015, Senator Bob Corker mentioned the Wall Street Journal article while questioning Assistant Secretary of Defense for Asian and Pacific Security Affairs David B. Shear about piloting a boat within 12 nautical miles (22 km; 14 mi) of one of the artificial islands and asked Shear directly: "Are we actually going to do that?" At the start of October 2015, the US Department of Defense made it clear that a FONOP within 12 nautical miles of one of China's artificial islands was "not a question of if, but when," and by mid-October 2015, US officials said the FONOP was expected "within days." On October 27, 2015, Lassen navigated within 12 nautical miles of reclaimed land in the Subi Reef as the first in a series of "Freedom of Navigation Operations."

Since October 2015, as part of the U.S. FON Operations (FONOP) program, U.S. Navy ships have patrolled near the artificial islands China has created in the disputed Spratly and Paracel archipelagos to underscore the U.S.'s position that the artificial islands constructed by China are located in international waters. USS Lassen sailed within 12 nautical miles of reclaimed-land islands (the so-called "Great Wall of Sand") in October 2015. USS Curtis Wilbur sailed within 12 nautical miles of Triton Island in the Paracel Islands in January 2016, and USS William P. Lawrence came within 12 nautical miles of Fiery Cross Reef in the Spratly Islands in May 2016.

In early 2017, the Trump administration stopped FONOPs in the South China Sea hoping China might increase its pressure on North Korea over its missile launch tests. In mid 2017, it restarted FONOPs. After restarting the FONOPs in the South China Sea the Trump administration increased the number of FONOPs authorized. Trump authorized six FONOPs in 2017 and five operations in 2018. 2019 saw a record high number of U.S. FONOPs in South China Sea with a total of nine operations conducted.

May 2018 also saw the first FONOP with the participation of two U.S. warships. On May 27, 2018, a US Navy Arleigh Burke-class destroyer, USS Higgins, and a Ticonderoga-class cruiser, USS Antietam, sailed within 12 nautical miles of the Paracel Islands, which are controlled by China. The FONOP came shortly after the Pentagon announced that it would disinvite the Chinese navy for its Rim of the Pacific (RIMPAC) military exercise off Hawaii the same summer, which is a US flagship naval exercise. The FONOP was called a "serious infringement on China’s sovereignty" by China's defense ministry.

On September 30, 2018, USS Decatur was undertaking a FONOP near the Gaven and Johnson Reefs in the Spratly Islands when the Chinese destroyer Lanzhou, approached to within 45 yards (41 m) of Decatur, in what the US Navy termed "a series of increasingly aggressive maneuvers" This forced the American destroyer to maneuver to avoid a collision.

In December 2018 China deployed naval forces to warn off USS Chancellorsville while it made a FONOP around the Paracel Islands without approval of the Chinese government. "The Southern Theatre Command organized navy and air forces to monitor the US vessel, and gave warning for it to leave", a statement by the Southern Theatre Command said in response to the U.S. FONOP. The Statement also called for the U.S. to properly manage its navy and air fleet to avoid miscalculations.

The U.S. FONOPs continued into 2020. The U.S. Navy conducted its first FONOP in 2020 on January 25 by sending the littoral combat ship USS Montgomery past Chinese claims in the Spratly Islands. During the FONOP China sent two fighter-bomber aircraft scrambling overhead to intimidate the crew of Montgomery, according to Chinese state media. The January 25 patrol was officially aimed at China, Taiwan, and Vietnam. Specifically, the United States Navy challenged the notion that innocent passage through claimed territorial waters requires previous notification.

On April 28, 2020, the Japan-based American guided-missile destroyer USS Barry conducted a freedom of navigation operation in the vicinity of Paracel Island chain off Vietnam. The PLA's Southern Theatre Command claimed its forces forced USS Barry out of disputed Spratly Islands waters; a US Navy spokesman denied that Barry had been ejected by the PLA and stated "all interactions that occurred were in accordance with maritime norms". The operation was carried out during the COVID-19 pandemic which have seen accusation from both Beijing and Washington accusing each other of trying to take more military control over the South China Sea during the pandemic. The operation done by USS Barry was followed up the next day on April 29 with a FONOP around the Spratly Islands done by USS Bunker Hill. This was the first time the U.S. conducted two FONOPs within two days. The back-to-back missions has been seen by some as a new U.S. strategy under the Pentagon slogan "strategic predictability, operation unpredictability." After the FONOP by USS Bunker Hill a spokesperson from the United States Seventh Fleet responsible for carrying out the operations said: "The United States will fly, sail, and operate wherever international law allows—regardless of the location of excessive maritime claims and regardless of current events."

==== FONOPs done by non-U.S actors in South China Sea ====
In 2015 Australia confirmed that it had been conducting "routine" FONOP flights over disputed territory in the South China Sea.

In May 2017 Japan sent an Izumo-class helicopter destroyer and two destroyers on a three-month tour of the South China Sea, where they conducted exercises with an Oyashio-class submarine. This was Japan's biggest foray into the region since the Second World War.

In April 2018 three Australian naval vessels transited the South China Sea towards Vietnam and, along the way, met a 'robust' challenge from the People's Liberation Army Navy.

At the June 2018 Shangri-La Dialogue ministers from France and the UK jointly announced that their ships would sail through the South China Sea to continue to uphold the collective right to freedom of navigation. The announcement came after the UK and France announced separately in July 2017 and May 2018 respectively that they would increase their involvement in the South China Sea.

The Royal Navy also conducted what is believed to be a FONOP with HMS Albion, a 22,000-ton amphibious transport dock, in late August 2018 in the waters near the Paracel Islands. The FONOP conducted by Albion was unlike many U.S. FONOPs a traditional assertion of freedom of navigation on the high seas. Beijing denounced the Albion mission because it sailed within its territorial waters around the Paracels without seeking prior approval. A spokesperson from the Royal Navy said that "HMS Albion exercised her rights for freedom of navigation in full compliance with international law and norms." The British FONOP has been seen by commentators as a signal that the Royal Navy is likely to be a regular party patrolling the South China Sea.

In June 2019, the Royal Canadian Navy frigate HMCS Regina and the Canadian replenishment ship MV Asterix sailed through the Taiwan Strait northwards towards the East China Sea. They were shadowed by both Chinese and Taiwanese naval and coast guard vessels during the voyage.

In October 2021 the Royal New Zealand Navy's HMNZS Te Kaha accompanied the UK Carrier Strike Group during a freedom of navigation transit through the South China Sea.

In mid-December 2022 The New Zealand Herald reported that 92 missions flown by Royal New Zealand Air Force fixed-wing aircraft since 2015 had been intercepted by the aircraft of foreign states in the Middle East and East Asia. The identity of these foreign powers and the exact location of these interceptions were withheld on national security grounds under the Official Information Act.

In June 2023, HMNZS Te Mana was confronted by two People's Liberation Army Navy frigates, helicopters, and four other vessels near the disputed Spratly Islands in the South China Sea.

On November 24, 2023 The Guardian reported that the Australian warship HMAS Toowoomba had entered the Taiwan Strait the day prior as part of a FONOP exercise.

On September 25, 2024, the New Zealand warship HMNZS Aotearoa sailed through the Taiwan Strait with HMAS Sydney as part of a joint exercise with the Japanese Self-Defense Force. This marked the first time since 2017 that a Royal New Zealand Navy vessel had sailed through the Taiwan Strait as part of a FONOP exercise.

==== Chinese view of FONOPs in South China Sea ====
China views FONOPs in the South China Sea, and particularly those undertaken with military vessels, as provocative, as they assert that freedom of navigation does not apply to military vessels within foreign EEZs and territorial waters. China also claims that FONOPs violate Chinese law, including the "Law of the People's Republic of China on the Territorial Sea and the Contiguous Zone" and the "Declaration of the Government of the People's Republic of China on the Baselines of the Territorial Sea". The Chinese Navy and Coast Guard often shadow foreign vessels on FONOPs.

In late February 2025, the Chinese Navy sent a task group consisting of the Jiangkai-class frigate Hengyang, the Type 055 destroyer Zunyi and the Fushi-class replenishment vessel Weishanhu to conduct live-fire exercises within Australia's exclusive economic zone in the Tasman Sea, disrupting several international flights. Their activities were monitored by the Australian and New Zealand Defence Forces. Australian Financial Review correspondent Jessica Sier, University of Waikato law professor Al Gillespie and a South China Morning Post editorial described the Chinese naval exercise in the Tasman Sea as a response to Australian and New Zealand naval activities in the South China Sea and Taiwan Strait.

== See also ==
- Freedom of the seas
- Innocent passage
- Indo-Pacific Maritime Surveillance Collaboration
- Code for Unplanned Encounters at Sea
- Danube River Conference of 1948
- FONOPs during the Obama Administration
- Freedoms of the air
- Operation Prosperity Guardian US-led multinational coalition in response to attacks on shipping in the Red Sea

== Notes ==
1.The exception of contraband implies that the inviolability of neutral ships was never absolute, as the principle still admitted the right of visit and search by belligerents.

== Sources ==
- Atherley-Jones, Llewellyn Archer; Bellot, Hugh Hale Leigh (1907). Commerce in War. Methuen & Company.
- Dupuy, René Jean; Vignes, Daniel (1991). A Handbook on the New Law of the Sea. Vol. 1. Martinus Nijhoff Publishers. ISBN 0-7923-0924-3.
