= 2025 Chinese naval exercises in the Tasman Sea =

Military exercises

- Location: Tasman Sea
- Planned by: China
- Commanded by: Xi Jinping
- Objective: Retaliate against Australia's and New Zealand's freedom of navigation operations in the South China Sea and Taiwan Strait; Expand capabilities of the People's Liberation Army Navy in power projection
- Date: 21 February – 9 March 2025 (2 weeks and 2 days)
- Executed by: People's Liberation Army; Southern Theater Command; Southern Theater Command Navy; Type 055 destroyer Zunyi; Type 054A frigate Hengyang; Type 903 replenishment ship Weishanhu
- Outcome: Diversion of commercial aircraft around live-fire drill operational zones

Between 21 February and 9 March 2025, the People's Liberation Army Navy (PLAN) of the People's Republic of China (PRC) dispatched a three-ship task group consisting of the Type 054A frigate (NATO reporting name as Jiangkai-class frigate) Hengyang, the Type 055 destroyer (Renhai-class cruiser) Zunyi and the Type 903 replenishment ship (Fuchi-class tanker) Weishanhu to conduct live-fire exercises within Australia's exclusive economic zone in the Tasman Sea, disrupting several international flights between Australia and New Zealand. The task group then went on to circumnavigate around Australia before returning to the South China Sea via the Sunda Strait and the Java Sea. Their activities were monitored by the Australian and New Zealand Defence Forces during the journey.

These naval exercises were conducted without official notice, with the Chinese government defending their legality as they were carried out in international waters. In response, the Australian and New Zealand governments have raised concerns about the military exercises with the Chinese government through diplomatic channels. These actions have been widely interpreted as further evidence of China's efforts to expand and consolidate its naval capabilities, marking a transition from a green-water navy towards a blue-water navy capable of sustained operations on the open oceans.

== Background ==
=== Chinese maritime claims ===
Since 1952, the People's Republic of China (PRC) has made territorial claims within the nine-dash line of the South China Sea. To bolster its territorial claims, China has deployed military and coast guard forces to the region and constructed several island outposts. These actions have caused tensions with neighbouring countries including Vietnam, Malaysia, Brunei and the Philippines. On 12 July 2016, an arbitration tribunal organized under the United Nations Convention on the Law of the Sea (UNCLOS) concluded that China had not exercised exclusive and continuous control over the area and that certain maritime features lay within the exclusive economic zone of the Philippines. However, it decline to rule on matters of territorial sovereignty. (Note: PCA Award, Section V(F)(d)(264, 266, 267), p. 113.) (Note: PCA Award, Section V(F)(d)(278), p. 117.) In response, both China and Taiwan rejected the tribunal's ruling and reasserted their territorial and maritime claims over the South China Sea. By contrast, Australia and New Zealand have joined 27 countries in calling for the arbitration tribunal's ruling to be respected.

Since 2018, China has also denied that the concept of international waters applies to the Taiwan Strait. While China does not claim sovereignty over the entire strait, it seeks to counter the United States' "support for the Taiwan authorities and muscle-flexing against the mainland". To assert Chinese territorial claims over Taiwan and counter American support for Taiwan, China has conducted several military exercises around the Taiwan Strait. China's position on the Taiwan Strait has drawn opposition from Taiwan, the United States, Australia and France, which regard the area as international waters.

=== Australian and New Zealand FONOPs ===
In response to Chinese territorial and maritime claims to the South China Sea and Taiwan Strait, the United States and other naval powers have conducted numerous freedom of navigation operations (FONOPs) in both seas in order to uphold navigational rights and UNCLOS provisions. China has objected to American and allied states' FONOPs in the South China Sea as "provocative," contending that foreign military ships traveling through territorial seas and foreign EEZs does not constitute "innocent passage." China also regards FONOPs as a violation of several Chinese laws, including the "Law of the People's Republic of China on the Territorial Sea and the Contiguous Zone" and the "Declaration of the Government of the People's Republic of China on the Baselines of the Territorial Sea". Both the People's Liberation Army Navy (PLA-N) and Chinese Coast Guard often shadow foreign vessels conducting FONOPs.

Citing their commitment to freedom of navigation and international law particularly UNCLOS, Australia and New Zealand have conducted their own freedom of navigation operations in the South China Sea and Taiwan Strait. The Australian Department of Defence and New Zealand Defence Force (NZDF) have acknowledged conducting freedom of navigation flights in the South China Sea and East Asia since 2015. In April 2018, three Royal Australian Navy warships transiting through the South China Sea towards Vietnam were confronted by Chinese warships. In October 2021 HMNZS Te Kaha accompanied the UK Carrier Strike Group during a freedom of navigation transit through the South China Sea.

In late May 2022, a Royal Australian Air Force (RAAF) Boeing P-8 Poseidon was intercepted by a People's Liberation Army Air Force (PLAAF) Shenyang J-16 jet during a maritime surveillance flight in the South China Sea, resulting in damage to the former's nose and engine. In June 2023, HMNZS Te Mana was confronted by two Chinese naval frigates, helicopters, and four other vessels near the disputed Spratly Islands in the South China Sea. In late November 2023, the Australian warship HMAS Toowoomba entered the Taiwan Strait during a FONOP exercise. That same month, the Chinese destroyer Ningbo used its hull-mounted sonar system to attack and injure several Australian naval divers from HMAS Toowoomba attempting to remove fishing nets from the Australian frigate's propellers within Japan's exclusive economic zone.

On 7 August 2024, Australian, Canadian, Filipino and American defence chiefs issued a joint statement reaffirming their commitment to freedom of navigation and overflight, and other maritime and overflight rights as reflected in the UN Convention on the Law of the Sea. On 25 September 2024, HMNZS Aotearoa and HMAS Sydney sailed through the Taiwan Strait as part of a joint exercise with the Japanese Self-Defense Force. This marked the first time since 2017 that a Royal New Zealand Navy vessel had sailed through the Taiwan Strait during a FONOP exercise. On 11 February 2025, a Chinese fighter jet released flares within 30 metres (98 ft) of an RAAF P-8 Poseidon in the South China Sea. On 13 February, the Australian Defence Minister Richard Marles lodged a formal diplomatic complaint. In response, the Chinese Foreign Ministry claimed the Australian aircraft had "deliberately intruded" into Chinese airspace.

=== Chinese relations with Australia and New Zealand ===
China has also objected to the trilateral AUKUS security pact, describing it as "Cold War thinking that would fuel military confrontation." Australia has ordered nuclear submarines as part of the first pillar of AUKUS. China has also objected to the second pillar of AUKUS, which focuses on collaboration in quantum computing, artificial intelligence and hypersonic weapons.

== Timeline ==
=== Prelude ===
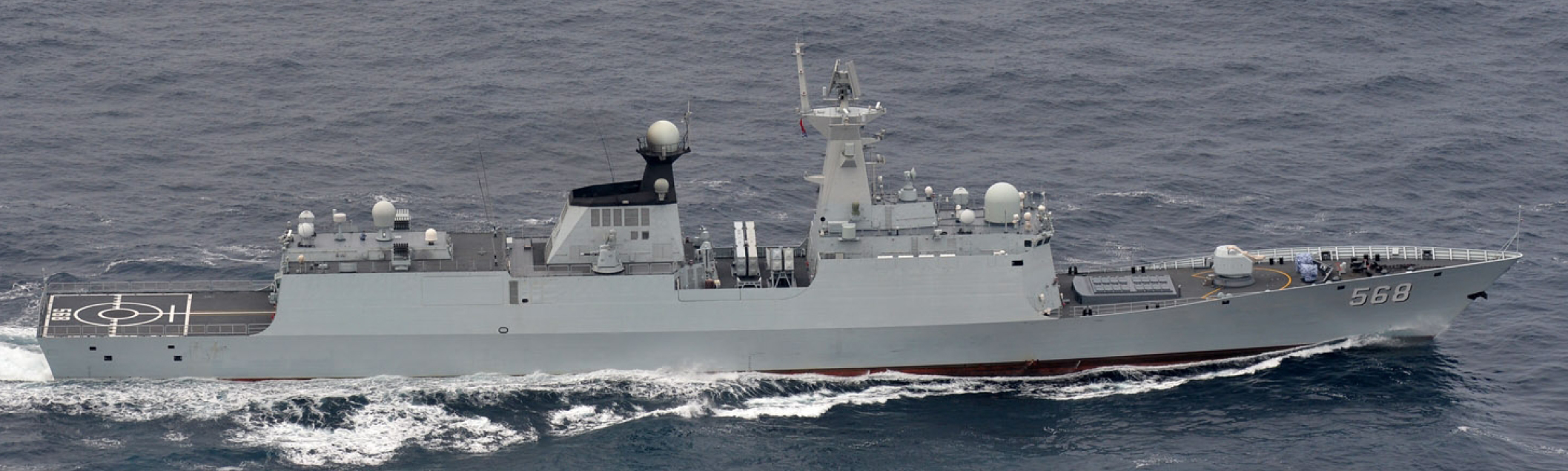
Chinese frigate Hengyang

On 13 February 2025, SBS World News reported that the Australian Defence Force (ADF) had been monitoring three Chinese warships operating north-east of Australia since early February 2025. One vessel, the Jiangkai-class frigate Hengyang, had sailed through the Prince of Wales shipping channel in the Torres Strait on 11 February. This channel is situated near Queensland's Cape York Peninsula. According to the ADF, the warships appeared to be operating within the boundaries of international law. According to Australian Admiral David Johnston, the three Chinese warships had previously been part of a larger Chinese naval task group that had been operating in Southeast Asia.

=== First week ===
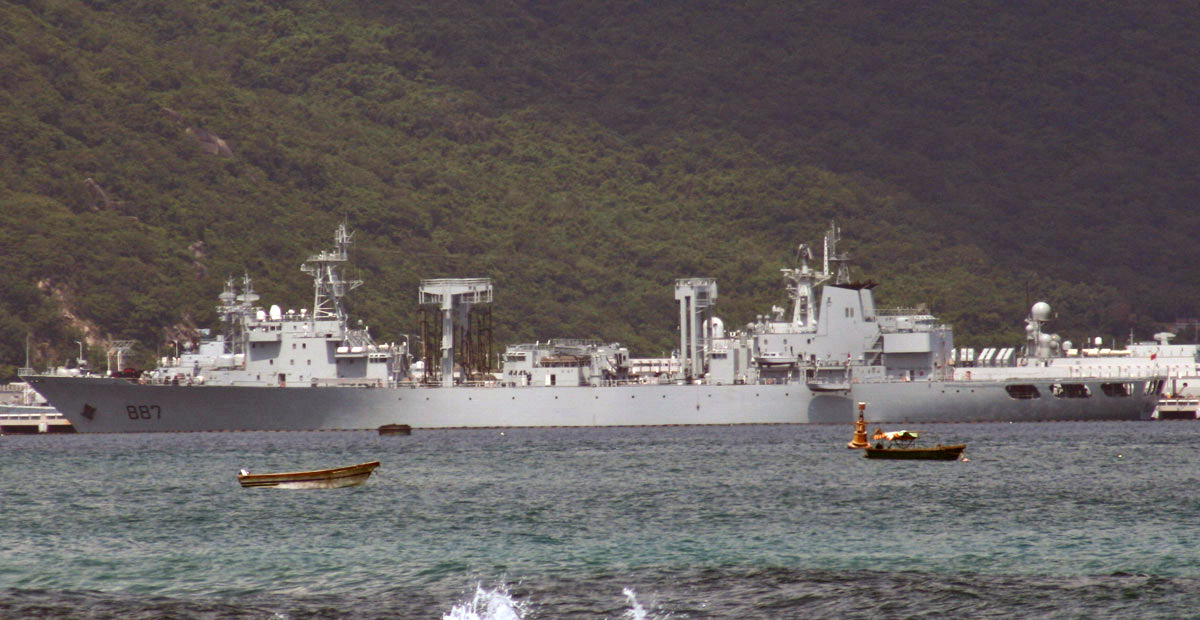
Chinese replenishment ship Weishanhu

On 18 February 2025, the People's Liberation Army Navy (PLA-N) Task Group 107 reached the edge of Australia's exclusive economic zone in the Tasman Sea before moving into international waters over the next three days. This task group consisted of three ships: the Jiangkai-class frigate Hengyang, the Renhai-class cruiser Zunyi and the Fushi-class replenishment vessel Weishanhu.

At 9:58 am on 21 February 2025, a Virgin Australia passenger jet flying over the Tasman Sea received an emergency radio notification from PLA-N Task Group 107 that it would conduct a live-fire drill 346 nautical miles (641 km) east of Eden, New South Wales, in international waters. According to The Guardian, Airservices Australia had notified the ADF about the drill ten minutes after initial contact between Task Group 107 and the Virgin pilot. Due to the lack of advanced notification to airmen (NOTAM), this activity caused 49 commercial aircraft flying over the Tasman Sea to divert their flights. Other affected airlines included Qantas, Emirates, Air New Zealand, and Singapore Airlines. Per international protocols, it is customary for military forces to give 24 to 48 hours notice to airlines before commencing live fire activities. In response, Airservices Australia and the Civil Aviation Safety Authority (CASA) declared an 18-kilometre (9.7 nmi) and 45,000 feet (14,000 m) airspace protection zone around the Chinese vessels.

During the first exercise, PLA-N Task Group 107 was shadowed by HMNZS Te Kaha, who observed Zunyi firing its main gun. During the drill, the Chinese warships changed formation and placed a target in the water, conducted maneuvers, and then recovered the target. The NZDF notified the Civil Aviation Authority about the Chinese ship movements. At approximately 11:01 am, the Royal New Zealand Navy also separately notified the Royal Australian Navy about the Chinese live-fire exercise, which was passed to the ADF. By 12pm, an industry telephone conference was convened in response to the Chinese naval exercise, which was attended by several airlines including Qantas, Virgin Australia and Jetstar.

On 22 February, the NZDF and ADF naval and air assets including HMNZS Te Kaha and Royal New Zealand Air Force (RNZAF) Boeing P-8 Poseidon aircraft continued to monitor the task group's activities about 350 nmi (650 km) northeast of the Bass Strait in international waters. That same afternoon, the Chinese task group broadcast its intent to conduct a second live-fire exercise. The tanker HMNZS Aotearoa provided replenishment support to Australian and NZ vessels in the area.

=== Second week ===
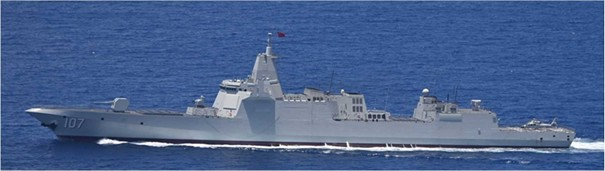
Chinese destroyer Zunyi

By the morning of 24 February, the Chinese task group had moved about 280 nmi (520 km) east of Tasmania, near Australia's exclusive economic zone. Flights continued to be diverted until 24 February while the Chinese warships sailed farther south. By 25 February, the Chinese task group had entered Australia's exclusive economic zone and were operating 160 nmi (300 km) east of Hobart.

On 26 February, the Chinese task group had moved south of Tasmania, heading in a westerly direction. The ADF and NZDF continued to shadow its movements. That same day, Admiral Johnston briefed the Australian Senate about the ADF's surveillance of the Chinese task group. He confirmed that the ADF did not learn about the first live-fire drill until nearly after 40 minutes it had commenced. The ADF had first been notified by the Virgin aircraft and then the RNZN, the latter of which had taken an hour to notify their Australian counterparts. Johnston's account was corroborated by Australian Prime Minister Anthony Albanese. Johnston also speculated that the Chinese task group was being accompanied by a nuclear submarine.

By 27 February, the task group had entered the Great Australian Bight and was operating about 296 nmi (548 km) west of Hobart. The Chinese ships conducted a third live-fire exercise, with HMNZS Te Kaha notifying civilian ships and aircraft in the area. By 28 February, Task Group 107 had moved 320 nmi (590 km) southwest of Adelaide. The NZDF monitored the Chinese ships between 22 and 28 February, with HMNZS Aotearoa returning to port on 28 February. By 1 March, the Chinese task group was operating 480 nmi (890 km) southwest of Adelaide.

=== Third week ===
The Chinese task group spent the next few days rounding the southwest Australian coast, coming to 170 nmi (310 km) south-southwest of Perth on 4 March. Three days later, the group reached 420 nmi (780 km) south of Christmas Island, which is governed by Australia. By 8 March, the task group was operating 155 nmi (287 km) south of Christmas Island. By the next day, the warships had reached Indonesia's Sunda Strait, which is situated between Java and Sumatra. ADF assets monitored the Chinese vessels between 22 February and 9 March 2025.

== Reactions ==
=== Australia ===
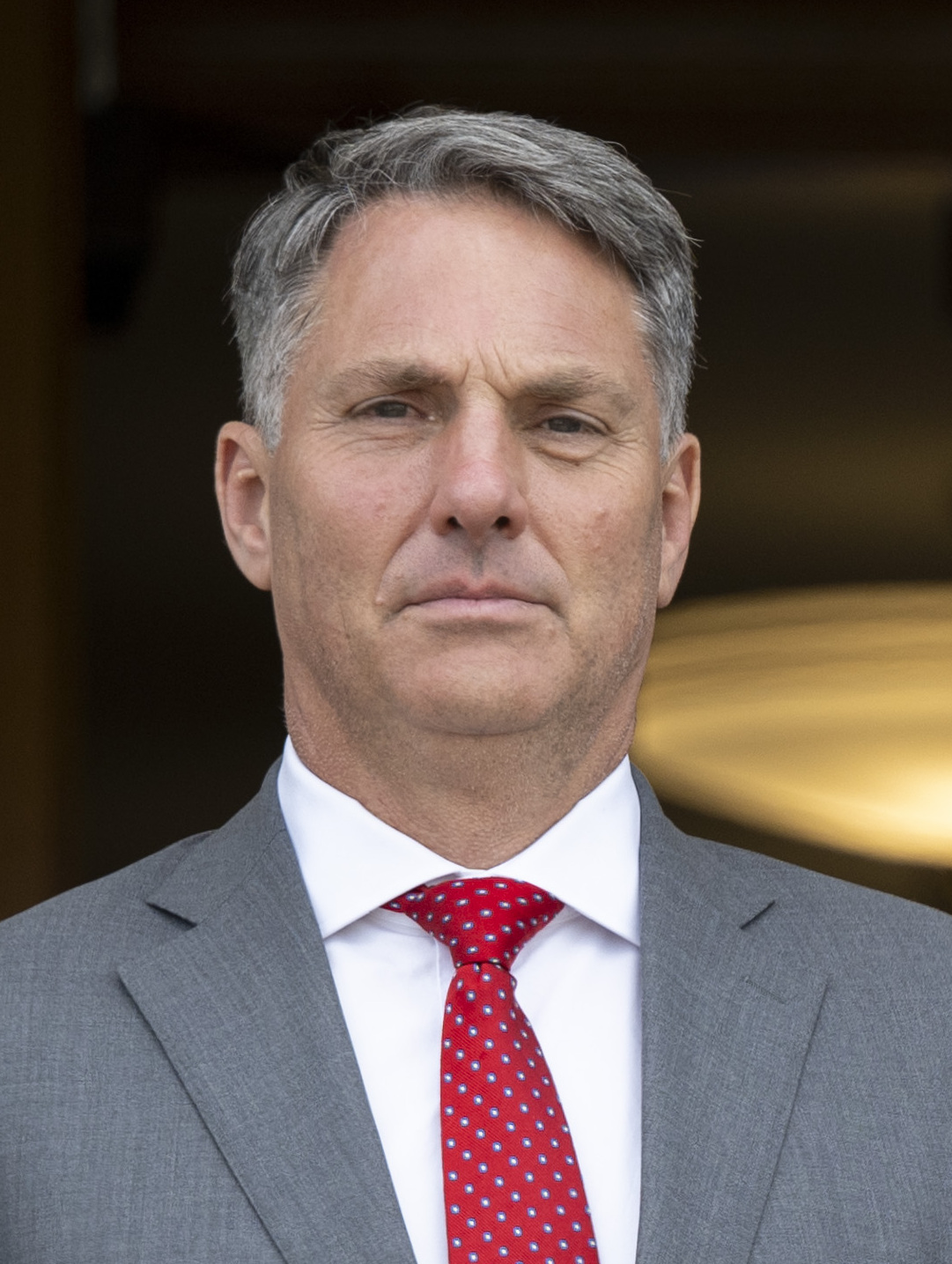
Australian Defence Minister Richard Marles

On 21 February, Australian Defence Minister Richard Marles lodged a complaint to the Chinese government via diplomatic channels in Canberra and Beijing for not giving the Australian government prior notice of the first live fire exercise. Australian civil aviation and defence authorities had only learnt about the live fire exercise ten minutes after initial contact between Chinese Task Group 107 and the Virgin Australia pilot. Marles regarded China's response as "unsatisfactory," stating:

"An issue here was that the live firing that was notified by China ... they notified a live firing exercise, but with very short notice, which meant that was very disconcerting for planes that were in the air."

Australian defence attaches in Canberra and Beijing also sought more information from their Chinese counterparts on the live fire exercise and any subsequent exercises. The ADF also issued a press release: "We respect the right of all states under international law to exercise freedom of navigation and overflight in international waters and airspace, just as we expect others to respect our right to do the same."

That same day, Australian Prime Minister Anthony Albanese confirmed that Australian and New Zealand defence forces were monitoring Chinese warships as they sailed down the coast of Australia. He described the activities as consistent with international law and said that Australia had issued a diplomatic warning to China.

On 21 February Wong, who was representing Australia at the 2025 G20 Johannesburg Summit, met with China's director of the Office of the Central Foreign Affairs Commission Wang Yi at the conference's sidelines to raise Australian concerns about the late notice and lack of transparency around the Chinese naval exercises. Along with rising military tensions, Wong also raised Canberra's concerns about Australian citizen Yang Jun's suspended death sentence. Wong described her discussions with Wang Yi as "calm and consistent."

Shadow defence minister Andrew Hastie described the Chinese naval exercises as gunboat diplomacy and criticised Albanese's alleged weak leadership over the matter. Similar sentiments were echoed by Leader of the Opposition Peter Dutton, who accused Albanese of being evasive about the timeline of the Australian government's knowledge of the Chinese live-fire drills.

=== New Zealand ===
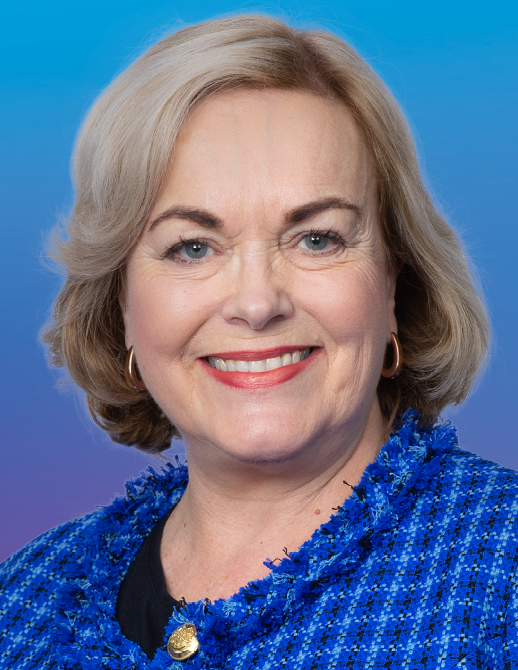
New Zealand Defence Minister Judith Collins

On 21 February, New Zealand Defence Minister Judith Collins described the Chinese live fire exercises as the "most significant and sophisticated" seen in the region. She confirmed that the NZDF had been tracking the Chinese warships for several days.

On 22 February, New Zealand Prime Minister Christopher Luxon said that the Chinese warships were following international law and United Nations conventions but described the Pacific as an "increasing geopolitical, geopolitically competitive part of the world." Luxon also said that New Zealand's prosperity was linked to its security, adding that the country needed to increase its defence spending. Luxon also confirmed that he had been in contact with Australian Prime Minister Albanese about the Chinese task group movements and that the New Zealand military had been monitoring the Chinese ships in conjunction with their Australian counterparts.

On 26 February, Foreign Minister Winston Peters met with China's director of the Office of the Central Foreign Affairs Commission Wang Yi to raise New Zealand's concerns about the Chinese naval exercises and China's recent partnership agreement with the Cook Islands, an associated state of New Zealand. Wang agreed to consider New Zealand and Australian concerns that the People's Liberation Army Navy did not give enough notice before conducting live-fire exercises in the Tasman Sea.

=== China ===
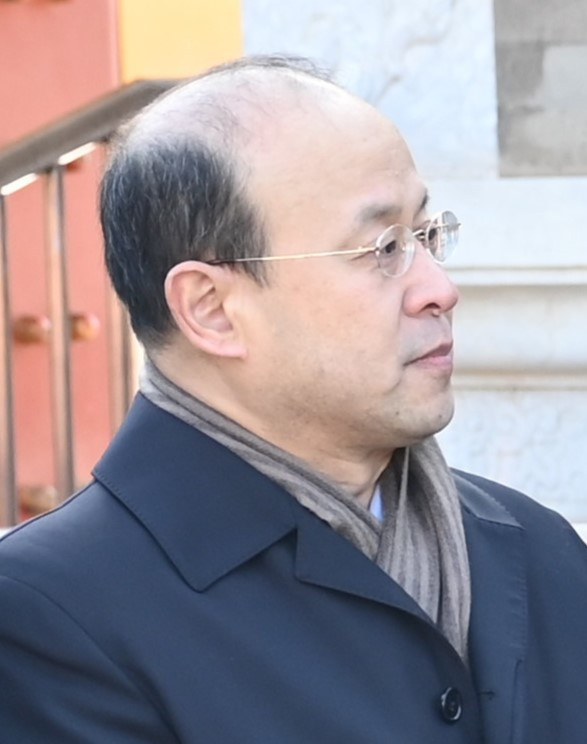
Chinese ambassador to Australia, Xiao Qian

On 21 February, Chinese Foreign Ministry spokesperson Guo Jiakun defended the PLA-N task group's live-fire exercises in the Tasman Sea, stating they were "conducted in a safe, standard, and professional manner at all times, in accordance with relevant international laws and practices". On 22 February, Chinese Ambassador to New Zealand Dr Wang Xiaolong questioned why New Zealand warships were near the coast of China, when question about the Chinese task group's activities by a ThreeNews reporter at the Wellington Lantern Festival.

Similar sentiments were echoed by Chinese Ambassador to Australia Xiao Qian. During an interview with the Australian public broadcaster ABC News on 28 February, Xiao said:

I don't see there is any reason why the Chinese side should feel sorry about that, or even to think about to apologise for that. Different countries have different practice and based on the nature of the drill, size of the drill, and the scope of the drill, my view is that the Chinese naval certification advice was appropriate. As a major power in this region, as a country that has so many things to look after, it is normal for China to send their vessels to different parts of the region to conduct various kinds of activities.

He also reiterated that Australia and China remained "comprehensive strategic partners."

Around 27 February, Chinese Ministry of National Defense spokesperson Wu Qian stated that: "During the period, China organised live-fire training of naval guns toward the sea on the basis of repeatedly issuing prior safety notices." He said that Chinese actions complied "with international law and international practices, with no impact on aviation flight safety." Wu confirmed that the Chinese live-fire drills included "simulated responses to a fast-approaching unidentified vessel, plus threats from the air."

=== Media and academic commentary ===
Australian Financial Review correspondent Jessica Sier described the Tasman naval exercises as a "dramatic escalation in General Secretary of the Chinese Communist Party Xi Jinping's Taiwan strategy, testing both Australia’s military readiness and the United States commitment to regional allies under U.S. President Donald Trump". On 24 February, University of Waikato law professor Al Gillespie wrote that the Chinese naval exercises in the Tasman Sea complied with the United Nations Convention on the Law of the Sea (UNCLOS) and the Code for Unplanned Encounters at Sea (CUES). He also opined that this military exercise along with China's recent partnership agreement with the Cook Islands and Chinese espionage and influence activities in New Zealand could cause Wellington to deepen security ties with its traditional Western partners and join AUKUS.

On 27 February, former Australian military officer and Australian National University National Security College expert associate Jennifer Parker described the Chinese live-fire exercises as compliant with international law but said that performing them near civilian air routes was "poor practice." Parker also described the Chinese Tasman exercises as a response to Australian and New Zealand freedom and navigation operations in the South China Sea and Northeast Asia. Professor David Capie, the Director of the Centre for Strategic Studies at Victoria University of Wellington, said that the Chinese flotilla and an intercontinental missile test in 2024, reflected the People's Liberation Army's ability to project power over long distances throughout the Indo-Pacific region beyond Taiwan. Capie also described the coordinated responses by the Australian and New Zealand militaries to the Chinese naval exercises as intentional messaging by the Australian and New Zealand governments to demonstrate "that they are allies and work very closely together."

On 28 February, Malcolm Davis of the Australian Strategic Policy Institute (ASPI) described the Chinese naval exercises as "strategic signalling" by Beijing that it could project naval capabilities against Australia at a time of its choosing." Former Indian Navy spokesperson Captain DK Sharma said that the Chinese naval exercises in the Tasman demonstrated the growing capabilities of the Chinese Navy beyond the first and second island chains, which has been accompanied by the expansion of Chinese overseas naval bases and facilities in the Indian Ocean including Gwadar in Pakistan and Mogadishu in Somalia.

On 1 March, the South China Morning Post editorial described Chinese naval exercises in the Tasman Sea as a response to Australian and New Zealand participation in US-led freedom of navigation exercises in the South China Sea and Taiwan Strait, which China has considered as part of its "internal waters.". On 2 March, Tamkang University assistant professor Lin Ying-yu has described Chinese naval exercises in the Tasman Sea as an example of gunboat diplomacy aimed at counter-balancing the United States and displaying its growing maritime power. On 3 March, Radio New Zealand journalist Phil Pennington described the Chinese naval exercises as a sign of Beijing's displeasure with New Zealand's involvement in "provocative" US military exercises directed at China such as Exercise Valiant Shield, RIMPAC, and "Autonomous Warrior."

The Lowy Institute commented that the live-fire exercise and circumnavigation was not a freedom of navigation operation (FONOP) as there was no excessive maritime claims to challenge, but a show of force that "were conducted in poor form for a nation that claims to be a responsible stakeholder". The Lowy Institute went on to conclude that Australia should counter Chinese naval operations abroad by continuing to invest in maritime capabilities such as the nuclear-powered fast attack submarines that will be provided under the AUKUS agreement.
