= Australian territory =

Australian territory means one or both of two different things:

- A specific Territory of Australia (as distinct from the six States of Australia), especially in the capitalised form (i.e. Territory rather than territory)
- Any area of land or sea under the sovereign control of the Australian government, including the:
  - Australian mainland
  - Australian external territories
  - Exclusive economic zone of Australia
