= Operation Argos =

Australian sanctions enforcement for North Korea

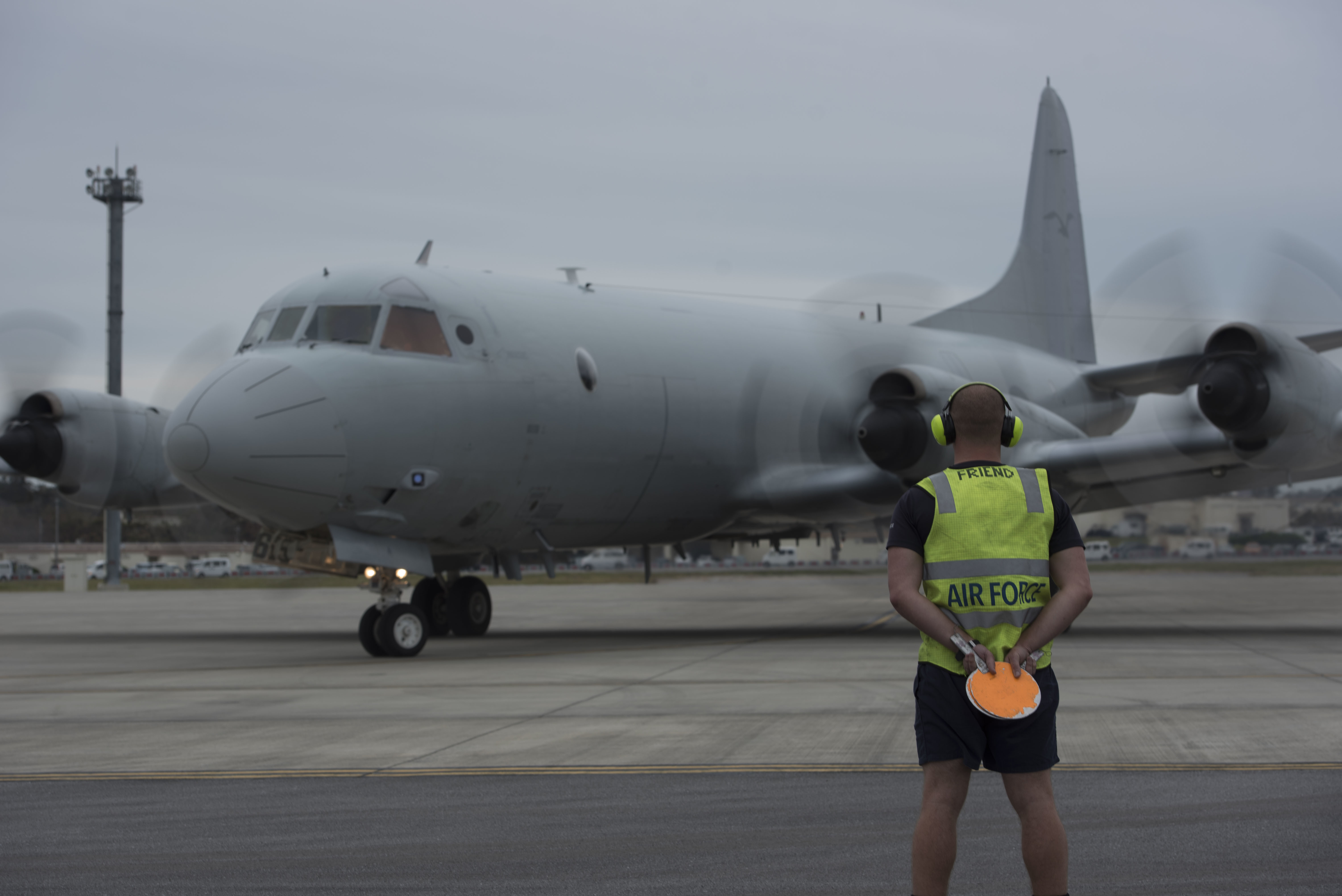
- A RAAF AP-3C Orion at Kadena Air Force Base in October 2018
- Location: North Asia
- Objective: Enforcement of United Nations sanctions against North Korea
- Date: Periodically since 2018
- Executed by: Australian Defence Force

Operation Argos is the Australian Defence Force's contribution to the international effort to enforce United Nations' sanctions against North Korea. The operation began in 2018, and is ongoing. The Australian effort is focused on detecting ship to ship transfers of contraband goods. It involves periodic deployments of aircraft and warships.

The international effort involves Australia, Canada, France, Japan, South Korea, New Zealand, the United Kingdom and the United States. It is coordinated by the United States Seventh Fleet.

== Deployments ==
Deployments have included:

- A RAAF P-8 Poseidon to Japan in May 2018
- Two RAAF AP-3C Orions to North Asia in September 2018
- HMAS Melbourne in September 2018
- A RAAF P-8 Poseidon to Kadena Air Base in December 2018
- HMAS Parramatta in late 2019
- A RAAF P-8 Poseidon to Kadena Air Base in February 2020
- A RAAF P-8 Poseidon to Kadena Air Base in September 2020
- HMAS Arunta in November 2020
- A RAAF P-8 Poseidon to Kadena Air Base from late February to late March 2021
- HMAS Ballarat in May 2021
- A RAAF P-8 Poseidon to Kadena Air Base from August 2021
- HMAS Warramunga in October 2021
- HMAS Parramatta in mid-2022
- HMAS Arunta in October 2022
- A RAAF P-8 Poseidon to Kadena Air Base from February 2023
- HMAS Anzac in mid-2023
- A deployment of two P-8 Poseidons to Kadena Air Base that concluded in September 2023.
- HMAS Toowoomba in November 2023. Several Australian naval divers were slightly injured by sonar from a Chinese warship during this deployment, when the sonar was activated close to the Australian frigate while they were removing a fishing net from its propellers.
- HMAS Hobart in April 2024.
- HMAS Sydney in mid-late 2024.
- A RAAF P-8 Poseidon to Kadena Air Base in November 2024.
- A RAAF P-8 Poseidon to Kadena Air Base in April 2025.
- HMAS Sydney in early-mid 2025.
- A RAAF P-8 Poseidon to Kadena Air Base in October 2025.
