= Chinese destroyer Zunyi (107) =

Type 055 destroyer of the PLA Navy

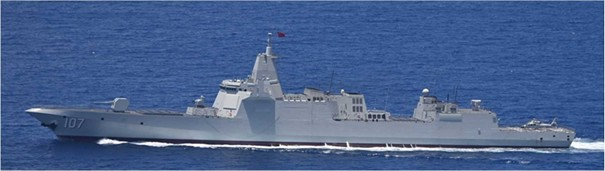
- Zunyi underway on 9 June 2025

History

China
- Name: Zunyi
- Namesake: Zunyi; (遵义)
- Builder: Dalian Shipyard, Liaoning
- Laid down: 2017
- Launched: 26 December 2019
- Commissioned: November 2022
- Identification: Pennant number: 107
- Status: Active

General characteristics
- Class & type: Type 055 destroyer
- Displacement: 12–13,000 t (12–12,795 long tons) (full load)
- Length: 180 m (590 ft 7 in)
- Beam: 20 m (65 ft 7 in)
- Draught: 6.6 m (21 ft 8 in)
- Installed power: 6 × QD-50 turbine generators (5 MW (6,700 hp) each); Total: 30 MW (40,000 shp)
- Propulsion: COGAG; 4 × QC-280 gas turbines (28 MW (38,000 hp) each); Total: 112 MW (150,000 shp)
- Speed: 30 knots (56 km/h; 35 mph)
- Range: 5,000 nmi (9,300 km)
- Complement: 300+
- Sensors & processing systems: Type 346B (C/S-band) radar; X-band radar
- Electronic warfare & decoys: Electronic warfare system
- Armament: 1 × H/PJ-38 130 mm gun; 1 × H/PJ-11 CIWS; 1 × HQ-10 short-range SAM 24-cell launcher; 112 VLS; HHQ-9 surface-to-air missiles; YJ-18 anti-ship cruise missiles; CJ-10 land-attack cruise missiles; Missile-launched anti-submarine torpedoes; 2 x sets; Yu-7 torpedoes
- Aircraft carried: 2 medium-lift helicopters; Harbin Z-9; Changhe Z-18
- Aviation facilities: Stern hangar; Helicopter landing platform

Zunyi (107) is a Type 055 destroyer of the People's Liberation Army Navy. She was commissioned in November 2022.

== Development and design ==
The People's Liberation Army Navy was interested in a large destroyer from as early as the late-1960s. A development program, code-named "055", initiated in 1976 was cancelled in 1983 after encountering insurmountable technical obstacles from industrial underdevelopment; for example, the required gas turbine power plants could neither be produced domestically, nor imported at acceptable prices. In April 2014, an image emerged of a full-scale mock-up of the Type 055 superstructure - with enclosed integrated mast for radar and other electronics at the Chinese naval electronic testing range in Wuhan.

The Type 055 is expected to undertake expeditionary missions and form the primary escort for Chinese aircraft carriers. While China classifies the Zunyi as a destroyer, the United States Department of Defense and the Office of the Secretary of Defense have classified the vessel as a cruiser since its full displacement weight exceeds 12,000 tonnes. The United States Navy defines a cruiser as a large multi-mission surface combatant with flagship capabilities; this suggests the U.S. expects the Type 055 to fulfill a similar role as the Ticonderoga-class cruiser.

== Construction and career ==
The Zunyi was launched on 26 December 2019 at the Dalian Shipbuilding Industry Company in Liaoning. The ship was commissioned in November 2022. It is part of the South Sea Fleet of the People's Liberation Army Navy.

Between mid February and early March 2025, the Zunyi was part of a task group of Chinese three warships including the Jiangkai-class frigate Hengyang and Fushi-class replenishment vessel Weishanhu, which conducted live-fire exercises in international waters in the Tasman Sea. The task group was monitored by both the Australian and New Zealand Defence Forces.
