= HMNZS Aotearoa =

Ship of the New Zealand Navy

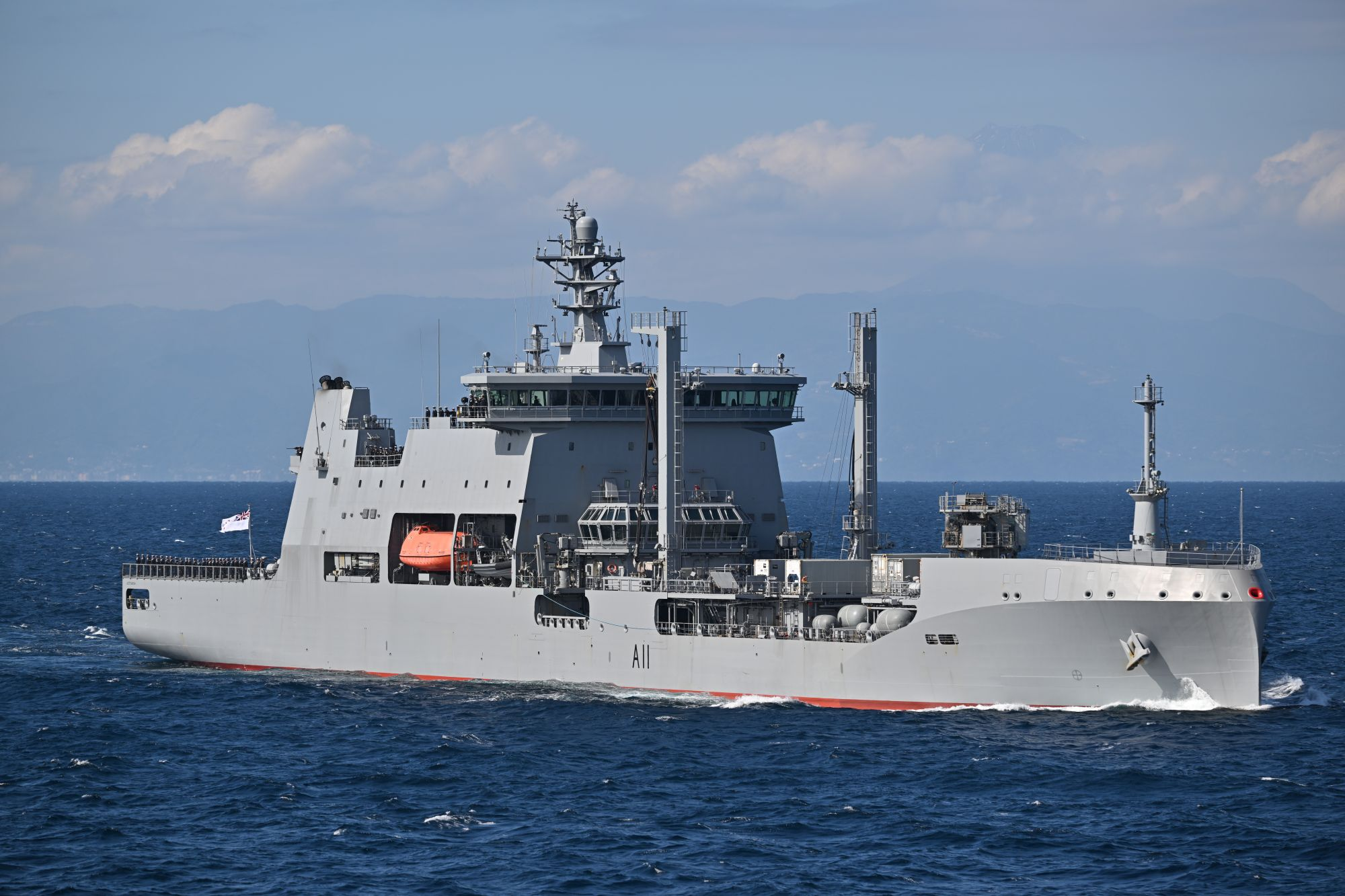
- HMNZS Aotearoa in 2022

History

New Zealand
- Name: Aotearoa
- Namesake: Māori for New Zealand
- Ordered: 2016
- Builder: Hyundai Heavy Industries
- Cost: NZ$493 million 2016
- Laid down: 13 August 2018
- Launched: 24 April 2019
- Sponsored by: Patsy Reddy
- Christened: 25 October 2019
- Commissioned: 29 July 2020 (6 years ago)
- Home port: New Plymouth
- Identification: Callsign: ZMKC; Pennant number: A11; IMO number: 9816220; MMSI number: 512450000
- Status: Active as of 2025

General characteristics
- Type: Auxiliary ship
- Displacement: 26,000 t (26,000 long tons)
- Length: 173.2 m (568 ft 3 in)
- Beam: 24.5 m (80 ft 5 in)
- Draught: 8.5 m (27 ft 11 in)
- Ice class: Polar Class 6
- Installed power: Main engine: 2 x Rolls-Royce Bergen B Series – for propulsion (5.4 MW each); Generator: 4 x MTU Series 4000 diesel generator (2.6 MW each); Emergency generator: 1 x STX KTA19 Series (410 kW)
- Propulsion: Configured with combined diesel-electric and diesel system; Main propulsion: 2 x Kongsberg controllable pitch propellers with Kongsberg shafting system; 2 x Kongsberg steering gear and rudder; Side thrusters: 1 x Rolls-Royce TT3000 CPP tunnel bow thruster (2.5 MW)
- Speed: Cruise: 16 knots (30 km/h; 18 mph); Max: 20 knots (37 km/h; 23 mph)
- Range: 6,750 nautical miles (12,500 km; 7,770 mi)
- Boats & landing craft carried: 1 × Zodiac J5 RHIB; 2 × Palfinger lifeboat (polar capable)
- Capacity: Liquid cargo capacity: • Diesel: 8,000 metric tons (18,000,000 lb); • Aviation fuel: 1,500 metric tons (3,300,000 lb); Typical dry goods cargo capacity: Up to 22 units of TEU containers
- Complement: Core crew: 64; Other: 11 flight, 14 trainees
- Sensors & processing systems: Sonar: FarSounder Argos 1000; Radars: • SharpEye Mk II S- and X-band (navigation); • Over-the-horizon radar
- Electronic warfare & decoys: Electronic support measures: • Radar Detection System (RDS); • CommSECA Communication Detection System (CDS)
- Armament: 1 × Phalanx CIWS (for, but not with); 2 × Rafael Mini Typhoon weapon station
- Aircraft carried: 1 × Helicopter (SH-2G, NH90, or A109LUH)
- Aviation facilities: 1 × Helicopter hangar; 1 × Helicopter deck (stern)

HMNZS Aotearoa (Māori: [aɔˈtɛaɾɔa]), (Note: HMNZS is a ship prefix meaning His Majesty's New Zealand Ship.) formerly the Maritime Sustainment Capability project, is an auxiliary ship of the Royal New Zealand Navy. Builder Hyundai Heavy Industries delivered the ship to the Navy in June 2020, and she was commissioned into service on 29 July 2020. Full operational capability was expected to be achieved in 2021. The vessel serves as a replenishment oiler, and has replaced HMNZS Endeavour, the Navy’s last fleet oiler, which was decommissioned in December 2017.

Aotearoa is the largest ship the Royal New Zealand Navy has operated.

== Name ==
HMNZS Aotearoa bears the Māori name for New Zealand. Aotearoa is commonly translated "the land of the long white cloud". The ship has been assigned the pennant number A11.

== Design and description ==
The ship is ice-strengthened and winterised to facilitate operations in Antarctica's weather conditions where Scott Base is located.

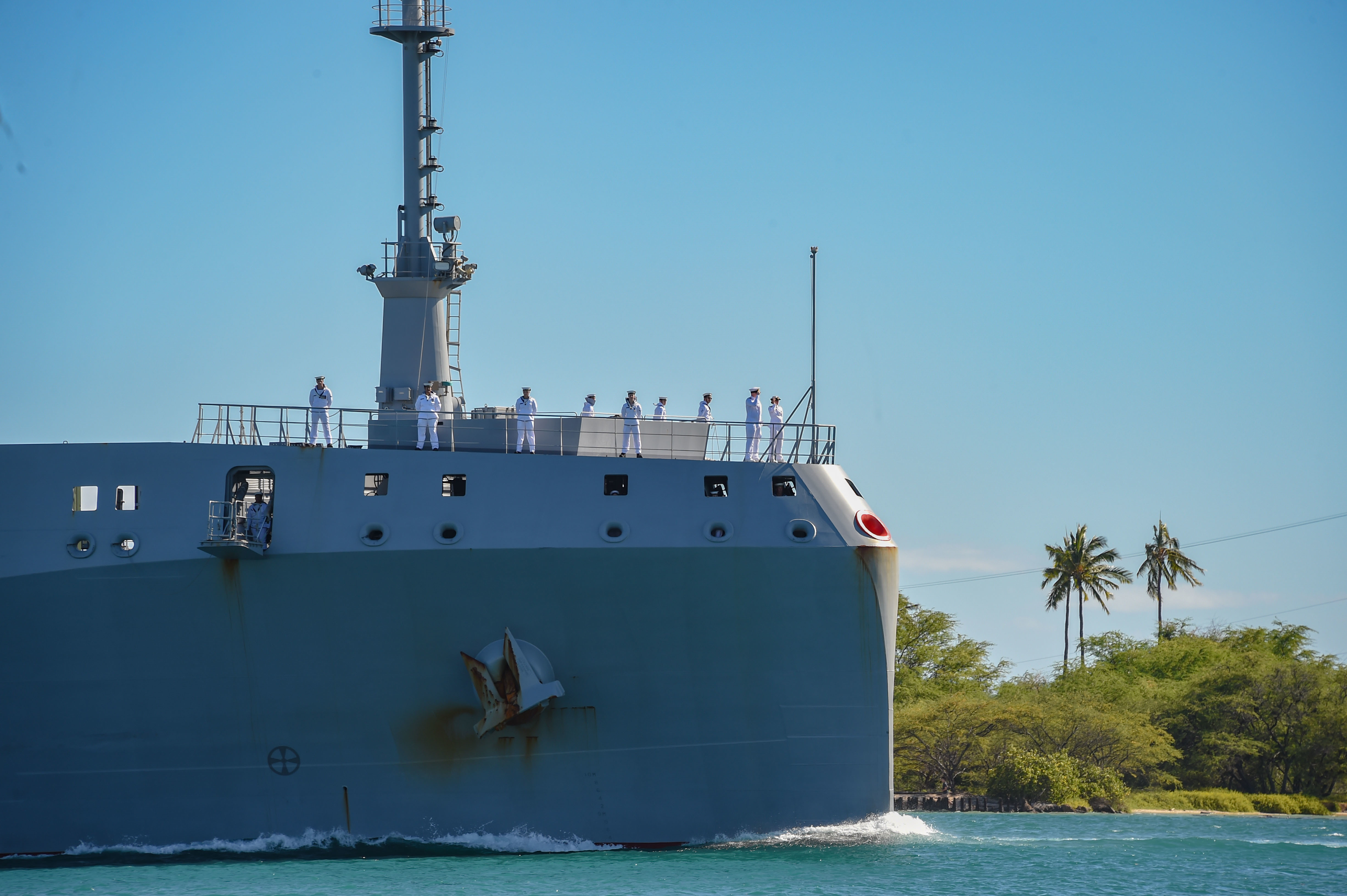
Aotearoa's wave-piercing bow

In addition to the wave-piercing hull design, this was Rolls-Royce's first naval hybrid electrical system. Rolls-Royce designed a hybrid diesel-electric propulsion system, known as the combined diesel-electric and diesel (CODLAD) system, solution that provides the ship with an optimised and flexible power plant with several fuel-saving operating modes. The ability to propel the ship using the electrical power through the MTU Series 4000 diesel generator whilst also providing electrical power for the ship’s hotel services and mission systems means that the vessel's fuel consumption is significantly reduced and emissions are minimised. The Rolls-Royce Power & Propulsion System arrangement consists of two Bergen B series engines, specifically, B33:45L9P, for main propulsion and four MTU Series 4000 diesel generator sets. Aotearoa is a Polar Class (PC) 6, Logistics Support ship designed and built with specialised winterisation capabilities for her operations in Antarctica. The electrical sub-systems were designed to support the high power generation capacity required for an ice-class ship.

Aotearoa is intended to support other navy warships by enabling re-fueling (diesel) and re-supplying (food and ammunition) during operations. The 26,000-tonne (26,000-long-ton) ship will provide marine diesel oil and aviation fuel. Aotearoa has the capacity to store up to 22 units of twenty-foot shipping containers, where four dedicated dangerous goods container stations could store ammunition or explosives. It has a 25 ton crane capable of loading and unloading goods, minimising the need for shore cranes. Aotearoa has a Kelvin Hughes Integrated Naval Bridge System and is equipped with Farsounder-1000 sonar. For navigation radar sensors it uses SharpEye S and X-Band with an S-Band SharpEye sensor optimised for helicopter approach and control. It is armed with a Phalanx CIWS (Fitted for, but not with) and two Mini Typhoon mounts and has a flight deck and hangar for helicopter operations.

== Construction ==
The contract was awarded to Hyundai Heavy Industries using a Rolls-Royce Environship concept design, beating competition from Daewoo Shipbuilding & Marine Engineering offering a variant of the BMT designed Royal Fleet Auxiliary Tide-class tanker. The ship was laid down on 13 August 2018. It was launched in April 2019, began builder's sea trials in December of that year and was formally delivered in June 2020. It was originally intended to be delivered in January 2020, but its departure from the shipyard in South Korea was delayed due to the COVID-19 pandemic.

== Operational history ==
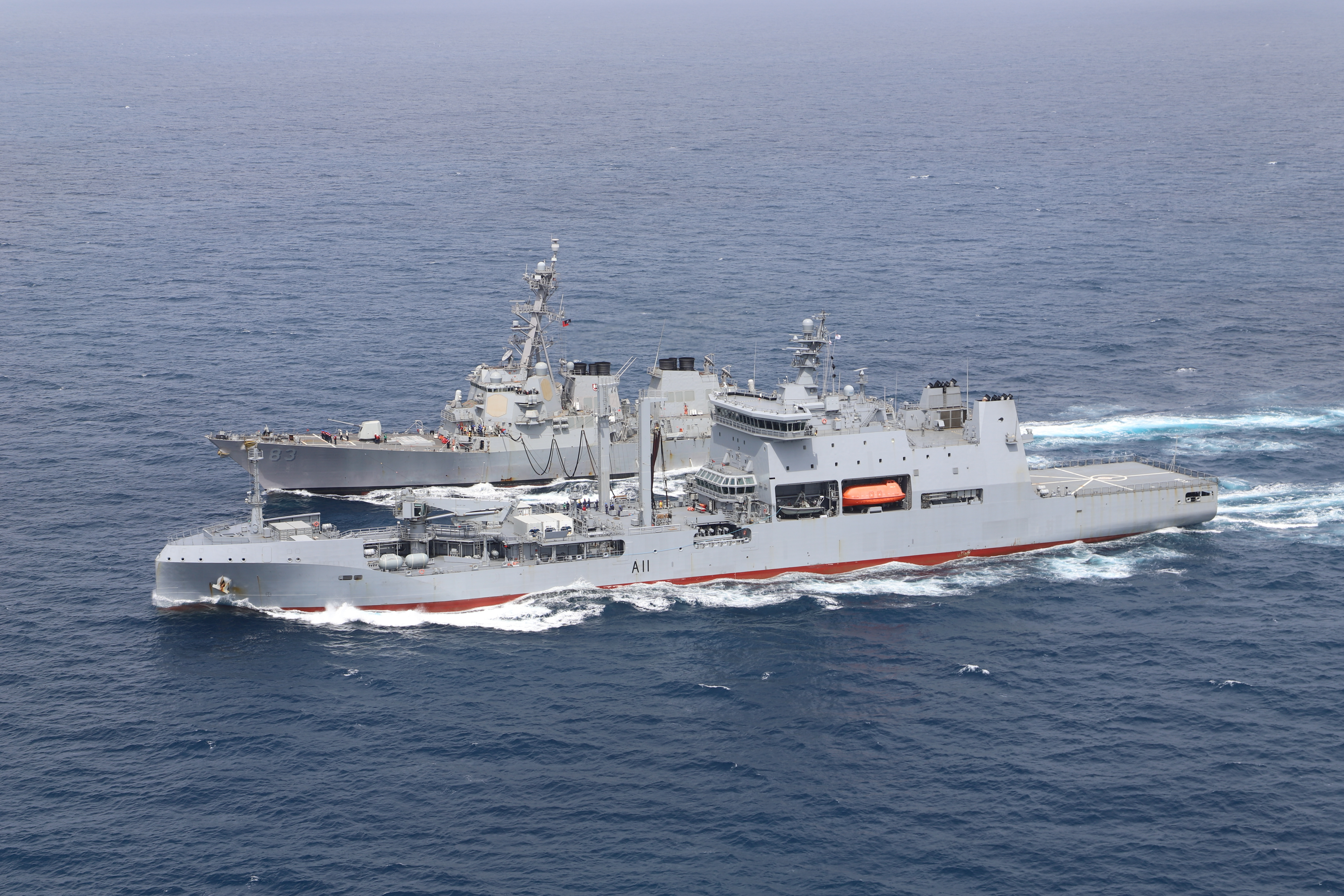
Aotearoa refuelling USS Howard in 2021

Aotearoa conducted her first 'replenishment at sea' (RAS) trials on 3 March 2021 with HMAS Hobart and HMAS Parramatta as part of her sea trials and bring the vessel up to operational standard off Australia’s east coast. Aotearoa and HMNZS Te Kaha participated in an international defence exercise in South East Asia in 2021 and also interacted with the United Kingdom’s Carrier Strike Group (CSG) as it conducted engagement activities in the Indo-Pacific region.

In response to the 2022 Hunga Tonga–Hunga Ha'apai eruption and tsunami, Aotearoa and HMNZS Wellington were deployed to provide water supplies, survey teams, and helicopter support. In early 2022 Aotearoa made a successful resupply mission to McMurdo and Scott base Antarctica. On 15 June Aotearoa set sail for RIMPAC 2022, where the vessel took part in the month-long exercise. Aotearoa remained in the Asia-Pacific region for nearly six months for various engagements that were not specified.

In late September 2024 Defence Minister Judith Collins confirmed that the Aotearoa sailed through the disputed Taiwan Strait on 26 September with HMAS Sydney. In response, a spokesperson for the Chinese Ministry of Foreign Affairs stated that China "handles foreign warships' transit through the Taiwan Strait in accordance with laws and regulations". On 29 September Aotearoa and HMAS Sydney took part in a joint maritime patrol with Filipino, Japanese and United States warships and aircraft in the disputed South China Sea, which has been claimed by China.

During the 2025 Chinese naval exercises in the Tasman Sea, Aotearoa provided replenishment and support to Royal Australian Navy and Royal New Zealand Navy vessels monitoring the task group.

In late November 2025, Aotearoa sailed through the sensitive Taiwan Strait while travelling north to take part in the United Nations' monitoring of sanctions against North Korea. The warship was monitored by seven People's Liberation Army Navy warships. During Operation Whio, Aotearoa was accompanied by an escort Kaman SH-2G Super Seasprite and an RNZAF P-8A Poseidon. Aotearoa and her Seaprite helicopter escort interrupted two "possibly illegal" ship-to-ship transfers, identified seven vessels of interest, hailed 49 merchant vessels, and broadcast 79 deterrence messages. During the period, the ship sailed together with ROCS Cheng Kung. The New Zealand military also coordinated their operations with Canadian, French and Japanese forces.

External videos
- HMNZS Aotearoa Replenishment Trials
- Take a Tour: HMNZS Aotearoa
- HMNZS Aotearoa first Replenishment At Sea
