= FONOPs during the Obama administration =

During the administration of President Barack Obama, there were six instances of the United States Navy performing a freedom of navigation operation (FONOP) in the South China Sea (SCS). During the same period the USN also performed multiple other FONOPs in other parts of the world. The SCS operations involved Arleigh-Burke class guided missile destroyers assigned to United States Seventh Fleet. The U.S. FONOP program began in 1979 and the Department of Defense (DoD) keeps public records of FONOPs since 1991 on its website. The Department of State (DoS) provided guidance to the DoD on conducting FONOPs, with a particular focus on the South China Sea and East China Sea, while pushing back on the People's Republic of China and their "excessive territorial claims", specifically with the Spratly Islands, Paracel Islands, and Senkaku Islands.

== Timeline of FONOPs during the Obama administration ==
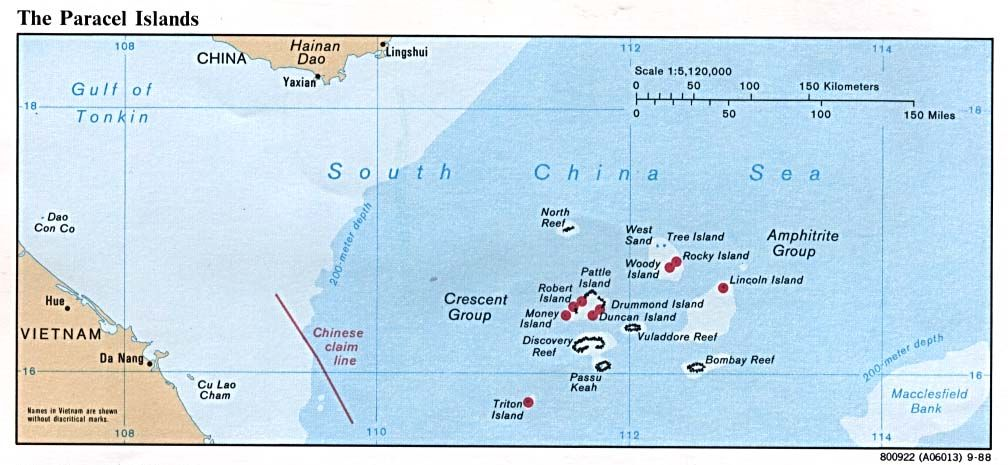
- Paracel Islands and China's excessive baseline claim
  August 15, 2013– USS Curtis Wilbur (DDG-54) patrols the Philippine Sea.
- May 21, 2015– US P-8A Poseidon conducts an overflight of Fiery Cross Reef.
- October 27, 2015– USS Lassen (DDG-82) transits within 12 nautical miles of Subi Reef and Mischief Reef.
- January 30, 2016– USS Curtis Wilbur (DDG-54) transits within 12 nautical miles of Triton Island in the Paracel Islands.
- May 10, 2016– USS William P. Lawrence (DDG-110) transits within 12 nautical miles of Fiery Cross Reef in the Spratly Islands.
- October 21, 2016– USS Decatur (DDG-73) transits near Triton Island and Woody Island in the Paracel Islands. Although this was not within the 12 nautical mile boundaries of each island, it did contest the excessive baseline claims by China.
- January 20, 2017– Formal end of Barack Obama's presidency with inauguration of President Donald Trump

== Background ==
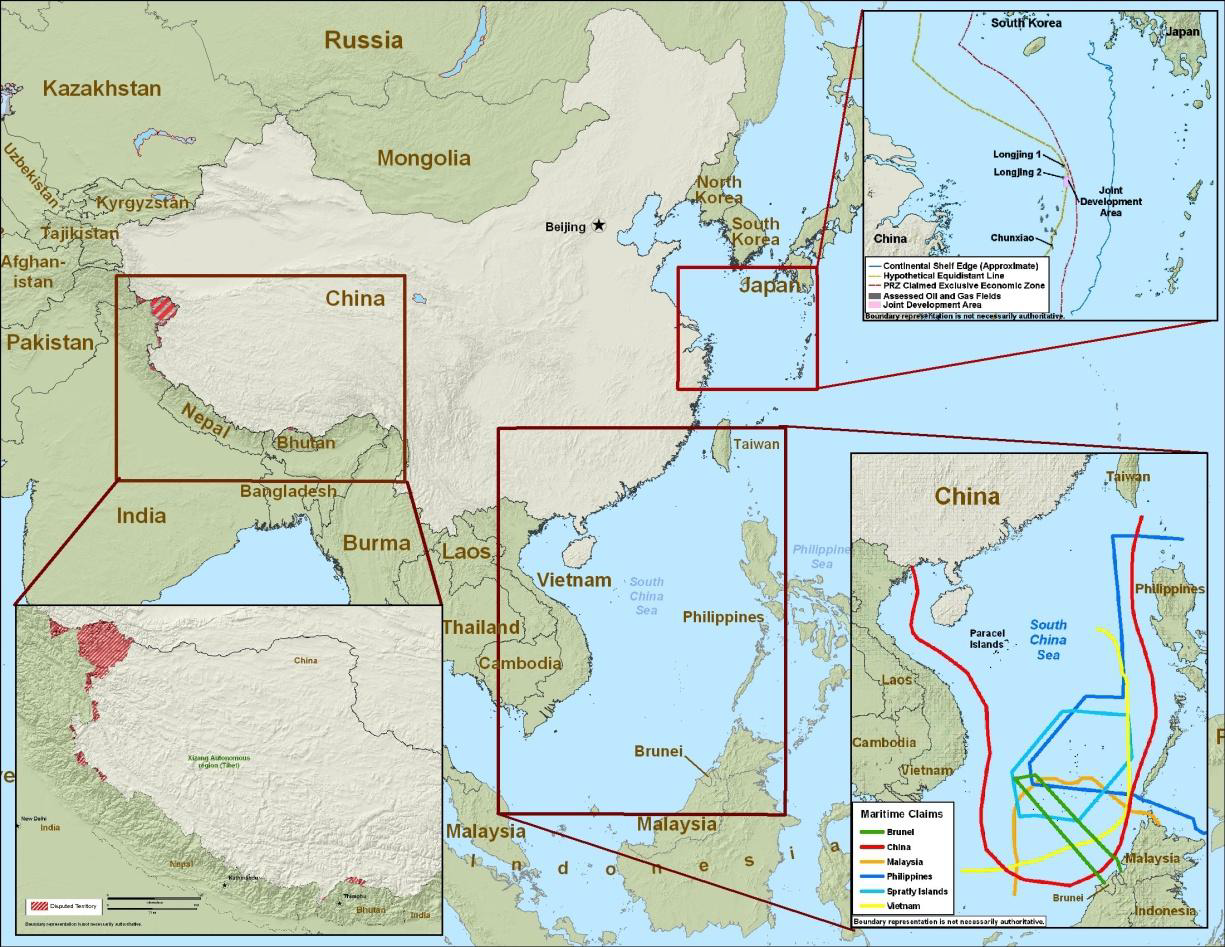
Although the South China Sea disputes have brought the most media attention between 2012 and 2017, China has many excessive claims in contrast to international law.

The Chinese People's Liberation Army (Navy) had established a significant presence in vicinity of the Paracel (Xisha) Islands through their own FONOPs prior to their confrontation with Vietnam during the Battle of the Paracel Islands in 1974. According to Chinese Law, specifically the 1992 Territorial Sea/Contiguous Zone (1992 TS/CZ) Law, China has full ownership of the Paracel Islands, which has created tension with the Socialist Republic of Vietnam and the Republic of China (Taiwan).

In 1983, President Ronald Reagan declared that the U.S. would not ratify the 1982 Third United Nations Convention on the Law of the Sea (UNCLOS III). China signed and ratified UNCLOS III in 1996. Nevertheless, the U.S. Navy- under the Obama administration- has operated in accordance with UNCLOS III with the use of innocent passage, proper communications, and respect for nations' territorial waters.

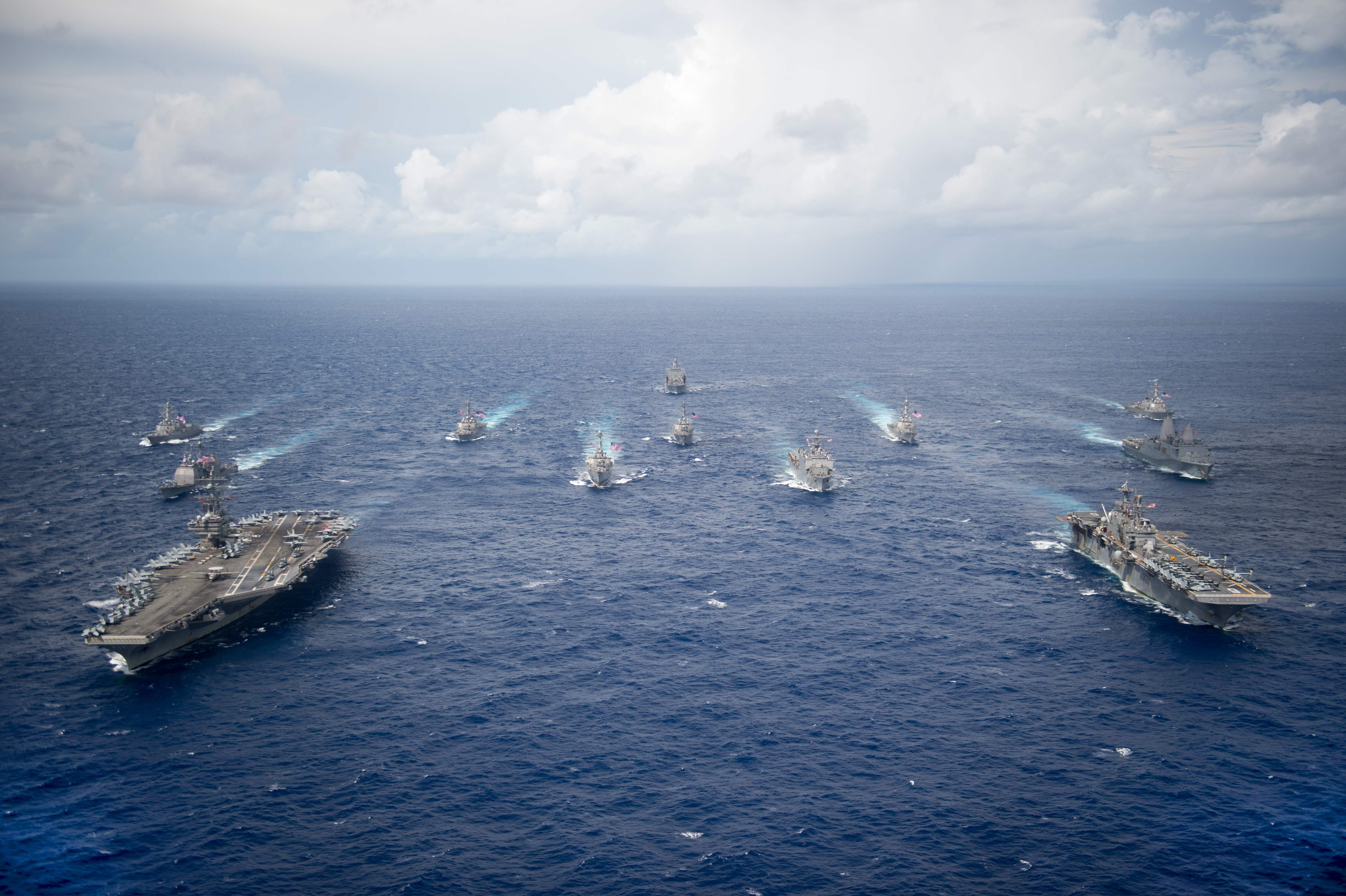
Throughout Obama's presidency, the US Navy's Seventh Fleet routinely patrolled the Indo-Asia-Pacific to maintain the freedom of seas

United States Pacific Fleet vessels spent a combined total of 700 days in the South China Sea during 2015 alone. This includes vessels assigned to Carrier Strike Group 5, which included the USS George Washington (CVN-73) until the summer of 2015, at which point the USS Ronald Reagan (CVN-76) took its place in the homeport of Yokosuka, Japan after a hull swap in San Diego, CA.

== 2016 international tribunal ruling ==
On July 12, 2016, the Hague's International Tribunal for the Law of the Sea ruled in the Permanent Court of Arbitration that the People's Republic of China's claims were excessive and violated the Republic of Philippines' sovereignty when they.

The Philippines filed the case on 22 January 2013 with a strong backing from President Benigno Aquino. Although the Obama administration did not overtly back the Philippines in the case, President Obama and Secretary John Kerry did publicly express support for the right of sovereign nations to follow international law and norms and to dispute disagreements in the legal and appropriate forums, although emphasizing that since the US is not a claimant they are a neutral party. China declared that it did not recognize the jurisdiction of the tribunal prior to proceedings, and requested the Philippines to do the same. Meanwhile, the Obama administration continued to urge all nations to follow international law and abide by the ruling for the remainder of Obama's presidency.

== Military exercises with SCS island claimants and the United States ==
Claimants to the South China Sea island disputes include Brunei, China, Indonesia, Malaysia, Philippines, Taiwan and Vietnam. Although the US is neutral in the disputes, the American military participates in training exercises with each claimant. During the 2016 Arbitration ruling, the Chinese Navy's CNS Changdao and divers participated in RIMPAC 16. Exercise CARAT and Balikatan are among several annual exercises involving these same nations.

== Gallery ==
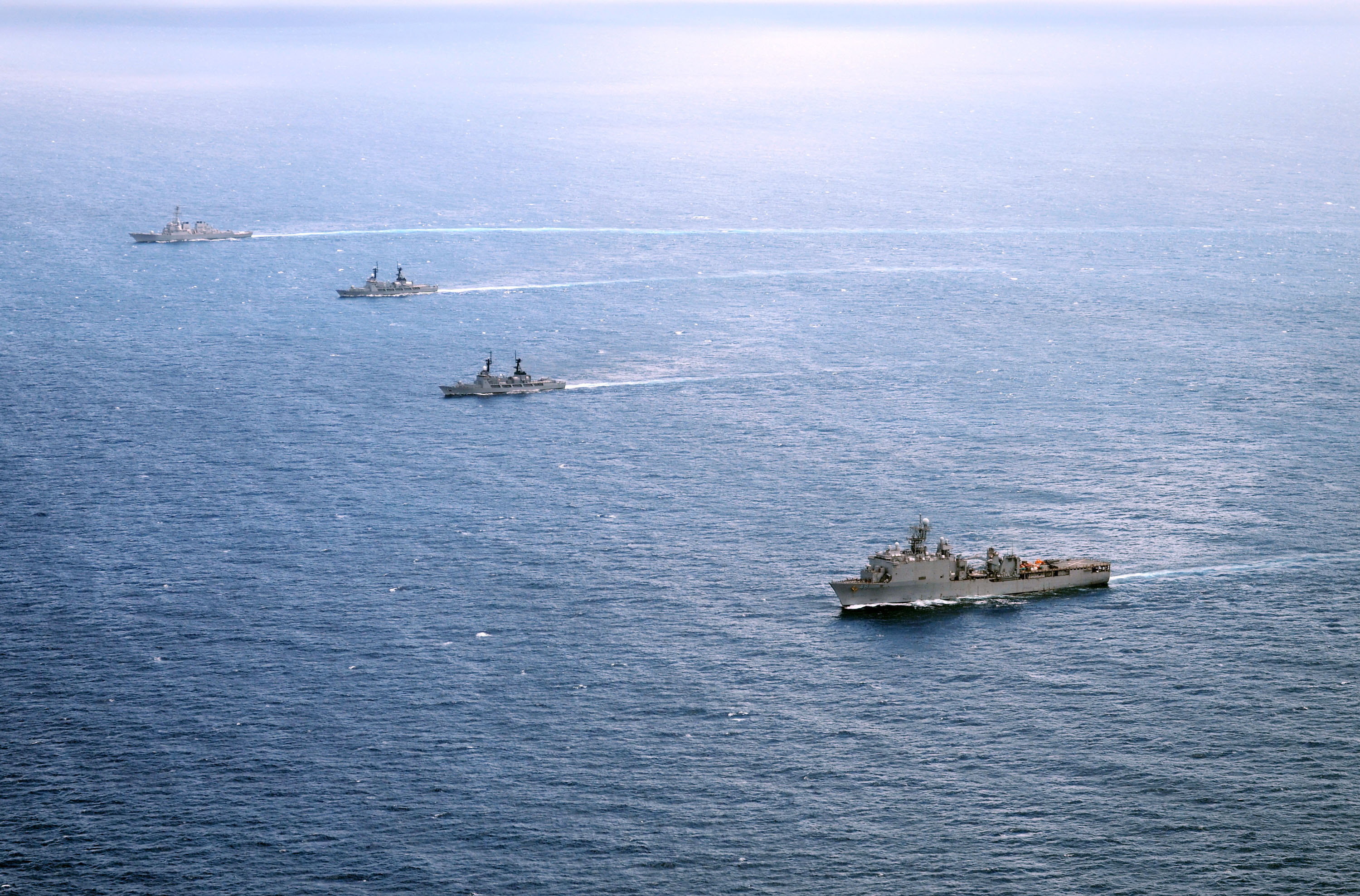
From top left, the guided missile destroyer USS John S. McCain (DDG-56); the Philippine frigates BRP Gregorio del Pilar (FF-15) and BRP Ramon Alcaraz (FF-16); and the amphibious dock landing ship USS Ashland (LSD-48) while in formation during CARAT Philippines 2014.

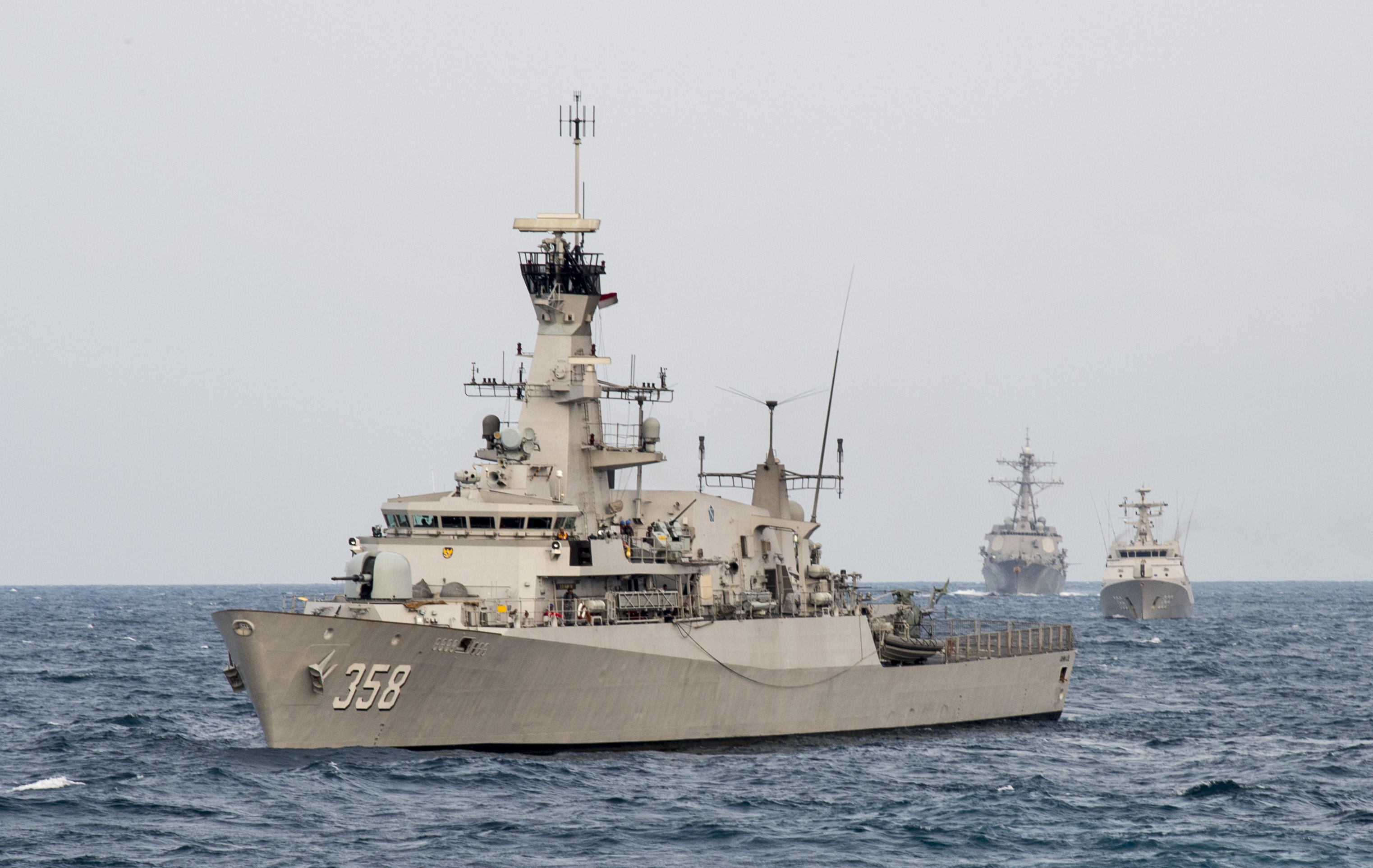
The Indonesian navy corvette KRI John Lie (358) lines up for a combined gunnery exercise behind the U.S. Navy littoral combat ship USS Fort Worth during the underway phase of CARAT Indonesia 2015.

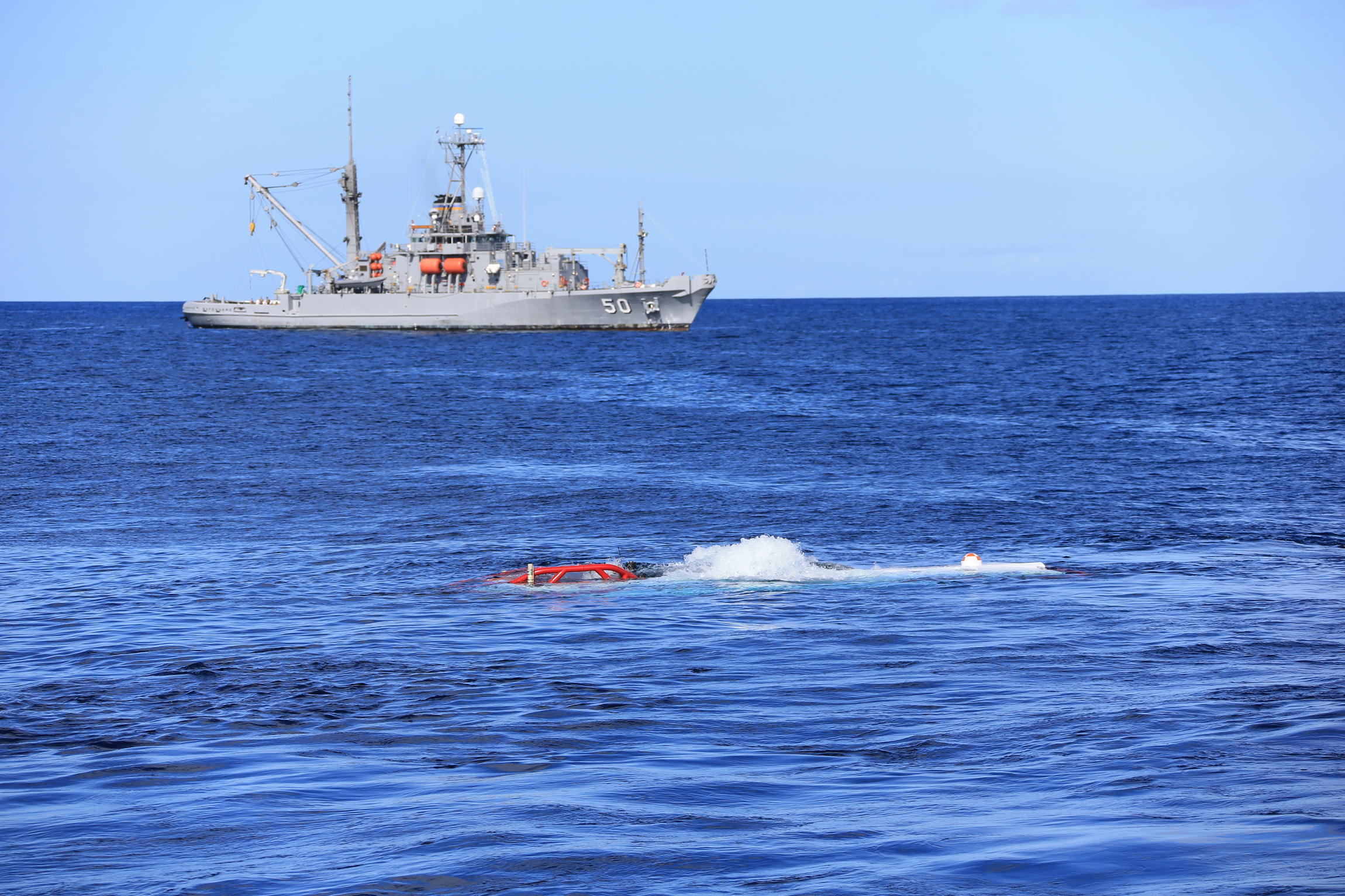
USNS Salvor operates with the CNS Changdao in a submarine rescue and dive/salvage exercise during Exercise RIMPAC 16.

== See also ==
- Spratly Islands dispute
