= Fushi-class tanker =

Chinese naval auxiliary ship class

History

PRC
- Name: Fushi class
- Status: Active

General characteristics
- Type: Replenishment ship
- Sensors & processing systems: Navigational radar

The Fushi-class tanker is a class of naval auxiliary ship currently in service with the People's Liberation Army Navy (PLAN), and has received NATO reporting name Fushi class. The exact type remains unknown, and a total of eight of this class have been confirmed in active service as of early 2020s. The hull is adopted for both transport oil tanker (AOT) and water tanker (AWT).

Fushi-class ships in PLAN service are designated by a combination of two Chinese characters followed by a three-digit number. The second Chinese character is Shui (水), meaning water in Chinese, because these ships are classified as water tankers. The first Chinese character denotes which fleet the ship is service with, with East (Dong, 东) for East Sea Fleet, North (Bei, 北) for North Sea Fleet, and South (Nan, 南) for South Sea Fleet. However, the pennant numbers are subject to change due to the change of Chinese naval ships naming convention, or when units are transferred between different fleets. Specification:

- Length: 55 metres (180 ft 5 in)

Type	NATO designation	Pennant No.	Name (English)	Name (Han 中文)	Commissioned	Displacement	Fleet	Status
Fushi-class tanker|Fushi-class transport oil tanker (AOT)	Fushi class	Bei-You 576	North Oil 576	北油 576	?	? t	North Sea Fleet	Active
Fushi-class tanker|Fushi-class transport oil tanker (AOT)	Fushi class	Dong-You 633	East Oil 633	东油 633	?	? t	East Sea Fleets	Active
Fushi-class tanker|Fushi-class transport oil tanker (AOT)	Fushi class	Nan-You 958	South Oil 958	南油 958	?	? t	South Sea Fleet	Active
Fushi-class tanker|Fushi-class transport oil tanker (AOT)	Fushi class	Nan-You 963	South Oil 963	南油 963	?	? t	South Sea Fleet	Active
Fushi-class tanker|Fushi-class transport oil tanker (AOT)	Fushi class	Nan-You 976	South Oil 976	南油 976	?	? t	South Sea Fleet	Active
Fushi-class tanker|Fushi class water tanker (AWT)	Fushi class	Dong-Shui 649	East Water 649	东水 649	?	? t	East Sea Fleet	Active
Fushi-class tanker|Fushi class water tanker (AWT)	Fushi class	Nan-Shui 964	South Water 964	南水 964	?	? t	South Sea Fleet	Active
Fushi-class tanker|Fushi class water tanker (AWT)	Fushi class	Nan-Shui 965	South Water 965	南水 965	?	? t	South Sea Fleet	Active
