= HMAS Sydney (DDG 42) =

Royal Australian Navy ship

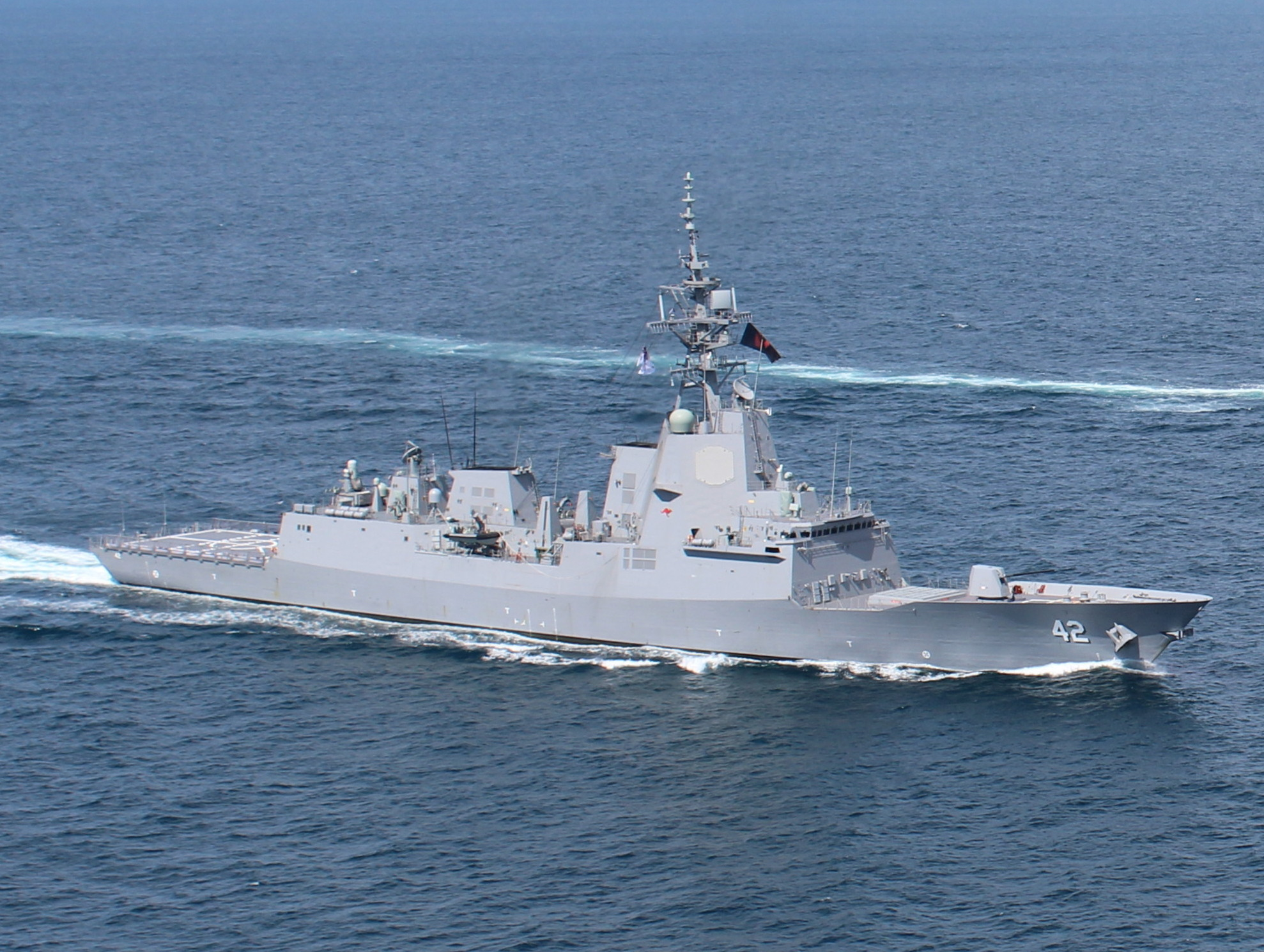
- HMAS Sydney in 2021

History

Australia
- Namesake: City of Sydney, Australia
- Ordered: 4 October 2007
- Builder: Navantia (designer); AWD Alliance (project coordinator); ASC (primary shipbuilder); Forgacs Group; BAE Systems Australia (module builders), Osborne Naval Shipyard
- Laid down: 19 November 2015
- Launched: 19 May 2018
- Commissioned: 18 May 2020
- Home port: Fleet Base East, Sydney
- Identification: MMSI number: 503000127
- Motto: Thorough and Ready
- Status: Active
- Badge

General characteristics (as designed)
- Class & type: Hobart-class destroyer
- Displacement: 7,000 tonnes (6,900 long tons; 7,700 short tons) full load
- Length: 147.2 m (482 ft 11 in)
- Beam: 18.6 m (61 ft 0 in) maximum
- Draught: 5.17 m (17 ft 0 in)
- Propulsion: Combined diesel or gas (CODOG) arrangement; 2 × General Electric Marine model 7LM2500-SA-MLG38 gas turbines, 17,500 kW (23,500 hp) each; 2 × Caterpillar 3616 diesel engines, 5,650 kW (7,580 hp) each; 2 × controllable pitch propellers
- Speed: Over 28 knots (52 km/h; 32 mph)
- Range: Over 5,000 nautical miles (9,300 km; 5,800 mi) at 18 knots (33 km/h; 21 mph)
- Complement: 186 + 16 aircrew; Accommodation for 234
- Sensors & processing systems: Aegis combat system; Lockheed Martin AN/SPY-1D(V) S-band radar; Northrop Grumman AN/SPQ-9B X-band pulse Doppler horizon search radar; Raytheon Mark 99 fire-control system with two continuous wave illuminating radars; 2 × L3 Technologies SAM Electronics X-band navigation radars; Ultra Electronics Sonar Systems' Integrated Sonar System; Ultra Electronics Series 2500 electro-optical director; Sagem VAMPIR IR search and track system; Rafael Toplite stabilised target acquisition sights
- Electronic warfare & decoys: ITT EDO Reconnaissance and Surveillance Systems ES-3701 ESM radar; SwRI MBS-567A communications ESM system; Ultra Electronics Avalon Systems multi-purpose digital receiver; Jenkins Engineering Defence Systems low-band receiver; 4 × Nulka decoy launchers; 4 × 6-tube multi-purpose decoy launchers
- Armament: 1 × Mark 45 Mod 4 5-inch gun; 48-cell Mark 41 Vertical Launch System; RIM-66 Standard 2 missile; RIM-162 Evolved Sea Sparrow missile; 2 x 4-canister Naval Strike Missile launchers; 2 × 2-tube Mark 32 Mod 9 torpedo launchers firing MU90 Impact torpedoes; 1 × Phalanx CIWS; 2 × 25mm M242 Bushmaster autocannons in Typhoon mounts
- Aircraft carried: 1 x MH-60R Seahawk

HMAS Sydney (DDG 42), named after the city of Sydney, New South Wales, is the third and final ship of the Hobart-class air warfare destroyers operated by the Royal Australian Navy (RAN). The ship is the fifth named after the city that has served the RAN.

== Construction ==
HMAS Sydney was laid down on 19 November 2015, and launched on 19 May 2018. The ship, based on the Álvaro de Bazán-class frigate designed by Navantia, was built at ASC's shipyard in Osborne, South Australia, from modules fabricated by ASC, BAE Systems Australia in Victoria, and Forgacs Group in New South Wales. The ship was delivered to the Australian Department of Defence on 28 February 2020, after sea trials since September 2019.

== Service ==
HMAS Sydney was commissioned at sea off the coast of New South Wales on 18 May 2020 due to the COVID-19 pandemic in Australia. This was the first time since World War II that an Australian warship was commissioned at sea. In March 2021, the ship's combat systems were tested in advance of any operational deployments.

On 8 May 2021 Sydney struck and killed two endangered fin whales which were discovered after the ship docked at the U.S. Navy base in San Diego, California. The Center for Biological Diversity announced its intent to sue the U.S. Navy and the National Marine Fisheries Service for what it called "violations" of the Endangered Species Act. The incident is under joint review by U.S. and Australian agencies.

In June 2024, Sydney was sent on a regional presence deployment, which included participating in RIMPAC 2024, Exercise Pacific Dragon and deployed on Operation Argos. On 19 July, Sydney participated in the sinking of the decommissioned amphibious assault ship USS Tarawa off the coast of Hawaii by firing a Naval Strike Missile. On 12 September, Sydney was deployed in Operation Argos in monitoring illegal shipment of goods in and out of North Korea.

In May 2025, Sydney was redeployed on Operation Argos and was attached to the UK Carrier Strike Group 25 on its indo-pacific deployment. The carrier group will also take part in Exercise Talisman Sabre off the Queensland Coast.
