= Exclusive economic zone of Australia =

Maritime boundary

Australia's exclusive economic zones, including its Antarctic claim

Australia's exclusive economic zone (EEZ) was declared on 1 August 1994 and extends from 12 to 200 nautical miles (22 to 370 km) from the coastline of Australia and its external territories, except where a maritime delimitation agreement exists with another state. To the 12 nautical-mile boundary is Australia's territorial waters. Australia has the third-largest exclusive economic zone, behind France and the United States but ahead of Russia, with the total area of 8,148,250 square kilometres (3,146,060 sq mi), which exceeds its land territory.

The United Nations Commission on the Limits of the Continental Shelf (CLCS) confirmed, in April 2008, Australia's rights over an additional 2.5 million square kilometres (970,000 sq mi) of seabed beyond the limits of Australia's EEZ. Australia also claimed, in its submission to the UN Commission on the Limits of the Continental Shelf, additional Continental Shelf past its EEZ from the Australian Antarctic Territory, but these claims were deferred on Australia's request. However, Australia's EEZ from its Antarctic Territory is approximately 2 million square kilometres (770,000 sq mi).

== Maritime boundary ==
North and east of Australia is an extensive maritime boundary with Indonesia, Papua New Guinea, East Timor, New Caledonia (France), Solomon Islands, and New Zealand.

It starts in the Indian Ocean, then runs through the Timor Sea, Arafura Sea, Torres Strait, and Coral Sea and ends in the Pacific Ocean.

There is also a maritime border between Australia and Indonesia in the Indian Ocean between Australia's external territory of Christmas Island and the Indonesian island of Java.

== Geography ==
Region	EEZ Area (km^{2})
Mainland Australia, Tasmania, and other minor islands (Note: Including the Ashmore and Cartier Islands and the Coral Sea Islands.)	6,048,681
(Tasmania) Macquarie Island	471,837
Cocos Islands	463,371
Norfolk Island	428,618
Heard Island and McDonald Islands	410,722
Christmas Island	325,021
Australian Antarctic Territory	2,000,000 (Note: The reference gives an approximate figure of 2 million square kilometres for the EEZ claimed by Australia as part of its Antarctic Territory. This is in addition to the 8 million square kilometre total given in the reference. This EEZ is also distinct from the 2.56 million square kilometres of additional continental shelf mentioned in the reference.)
Total	8,148,250

== See also ==
- Australia–Indonesia border
- Australian marine parks
- Australian Whale Sanctuary
- Geography of Australia
- Timor Sea Treaty
