= Xining Joint Logistics Support Center =

Logistics support main unit of the Western theater of the PLA

- 西宁联勤保障中心
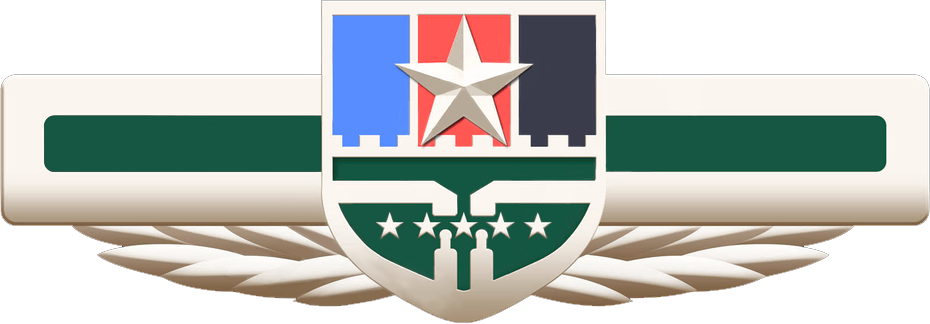
- Founded: 13 September 2016; 9 years ago
- Country: China
- Allegiance: Chinese Communist Party
- Branch: Joint Logistics Support Force
- Type: Logistics service
- Role: Military logistics
- Part of: People's Liberation Army
- Garrison/HQ: Xining, Qinghai, China

Commanders
- Commander: PLAGF Maj Gen Qian Jiyuan (钱纪源)
- Political Commissar: PLAGF Sr Col Gao Xun (高汛)

Insignia
- Sleeve badge

The Xining Joint Logistics Support Center (西宁联勤保障中心) located in Xining City, Qinghai Province is the local supreme organ of the Joint Logistics Support Force at the Western Command of the People's Liberation Army, at a corps-deputy grade.

== History ==
In 1977, the Lanzhou Military Area Logistics Department first base was established as the PLA 25th Logistic subunit (MUCD Unit 84906). In 1981, it was transferred to Xining City Yangjia Port area.

As part of the 2015 military reforms, the Joint Logistics Support Force was established in January 2016. Its principal organ was the Wuhan Joint Logistics Support Base. On 13 September 2016, the five main Joint Logistics Centers at Wuxi, Guilin, Xining, Shenyang and Zhengzhou were established as the subordinate units of the Wuhan JLSB, using the existing logistic units of the Theaters.

== Organization ==
- General Staff Department (参谋部)
  - Combat Logistics Training Office (战勤训练处)
  - Directly Subordinate Units Office (直属工作处)
- Political Work Department (政治工作部)
  - Information and Propaganda Office (宣传处)
  - Military and Civilian Staff Office (兵员和文职人员处)
- Supply Office (供应处)
- Transport and Distribution Office (运输投送处)
- Field Medical Services Office (卫勤处)
- Warehouse Management Office (仓储管理处)
- Military Installations Construction Office (军事设施建设处)
- Engineering and Informatization Office (科技和信息化处)

=== Military Representative Offices (军事代表办事处) ===
- Military Representative Office at the Chengdu Railway Bureau (成都铁路局)
- Military Representative Office at the Lanzhou Railway Bureau (兰州铁路局)
- Military Representative Office at the Ürümqi Railway Bureau (乌鲁木齐铁路局)
- Military Representative Office at the China Railway Qingzang Group (青藏铁路公司)

=== Directly subordinate units ===
- PLA Western Theater Command General Hospital (中国人民解放军西部战区总医院), Chengdu
- JLSF 940th Hospital (第九四〇医院), Lanzhou
- JLSF 941st Hospital (第九四一医院), Xining
- JLSF 942nd Hospital (第九四二医院), Yinchuan
- JLSF 943rd Hospital (第九四三医院), Wuwei
- JLSF 944th Hospital (第九四四医院), Jiuquan
- JLSF 945th Hospital (第九四五医院), Ya'an
- JLSF Emei Rehabilitation and Convalescence Center (峨眉康复疗养中心). Emeishan City
- Western Theater Disease Prevention and Control Command Center (中国人民解放军西部战区疾病预防控制中心)
- Vehicle Driving Training Group (某司机训练大队)

== Leadership ==
=== Xining JLSC Commander ===
1. PLAGF Maj Gen Qian Jiyuan (钱纪源)（2016年—）

=== Xining JLSC Deputy Commander ===
- Sr Col Zhang Liuwang (张留旺)（2016年—）

=== Xining JLSC Political Commissar ===
1. Sr Col Gao Xun (高汛)（2016年—）
