= Chen Yueqi =

Chinese admiral

- 陈岳琪

Deputy Commander of the Eastern Theater Command
- Incumbent
- Assumed office June 2023
- Preceded by: Wang Kangping

Personal details
- Born: December 1965 (age 60) Yuyao, Zhejiang, China
- Party: Chinese Communist Party
- Education: People's Liberation Army National Defense University

Military service
- Allegiance: People's Republic of China
- Branch/service: People's Liberation Army Navy
- Years of service: ?-present
- Rank: Vice Admiral
- Unit: Liaoning Guangxi Military Region Joint Logistics Support Force Eastern Theater Command
- Battles/wars: Sixth Escort to the Gulf of Aden

Chen Yueqi (Chinese: 陈岳琪; born December 1965) is a Vice Admiral (zhongjiang) of the People's Liberation Army (PLA) who is the current deputy commander of the Eastern Theater Command, in June 2023.

== Biography ==
Born in Yuyao County, Zhejiang, in December 1965, he graduated from National Defense University. He has served as the captain of the Zhaoqing frigate. He then served as the Captain of a destroyer detachment of the PLA Navy.

He participated in the "Peace-09" multinational joint military exercise held in Pakistan in 2009 where he led a warship. He also led ships to the Gulf of Aden and Somali waters to carry out its sixth escort mission. Also he led a new warship conduct maritime exchanges with the Singaporean Navy.

In March 2014 he was assigned to serve as the commander of the Liaoning Aircraft Carrier Formation replacing Wang Hai and in July 2015 he got promoted to the rank of Rear Admiral. Chen was reassigned to the position, commander of the Guangxi Military Region replacing Major General Xiao Yunhong. In 2020 he served as the deputy commander of the People's Liberation Army Joint Logistics Support Force and in June 2023 he got promoted to the rank of lieutenant general and deputy commander of the Eastern Theater Command. From January 13, 2025, to January 17, 2025, he was visiting Japan, leading the delegation of the Eastern Theater Command holding talks with senior defense officials of the Japanese Self Defense Force.

Military offices
Preceded by Wang Kangping	Deputy Commander of the Eastern Theater Command; 2023-present	Incumbent
