= Wang Liyan =

Chinese Lieutenant General

- 王立岩

Commander of the People's Liberation Army Joint Logistics Support Force
- In office August 2021 – October 2024
- Preceded by: Li Yong
- Succeeded by: Wang Kangping

Personal details
- Born: 1962 (age 63–64) China
- Party: Chinese Communist Party

Military service
- Allegiance: People's Republic of China
- Branch/service: People's Liberation Army Ground Force
- Rank: Lieutenant general

Wang Liyan (Chinese: 王立岩; pinyin: Wáng Lìyán; born 1962) is a lieutenant general in the People's Liberation Army of China.

He is an alternate of the 20th Central Committee of the Chinese Communist Party.

== Biography ==
Wang was born in 1962.

He once served as deputy director of the Headquarters of the Second Artillery Force (now People's Liberation Army Rocket Force) and dean of the NCO Vocational and Technical Education School of the Second Artillery Force Engineering University.

He became deputy chief engineer of the 54th Base of the Second Artillery Force in 2012, he remained in that position until July 2014, when he was appointed deputy chief of staff of the South China Sea Fleet.

In 2019, he was made deputy director of the General Office of the Central Military Commission, and served until August 2021, when he was promoted to commander of the People's Liberation Army Joint Logistics Support Force.

He was promoted to the rank of major general (shaojiang) in December 2013 and lieutenant general (zhongjiang) in August 2021.
