= Chinese replenishment ship Luomahu =

Type 903A replenishment ship

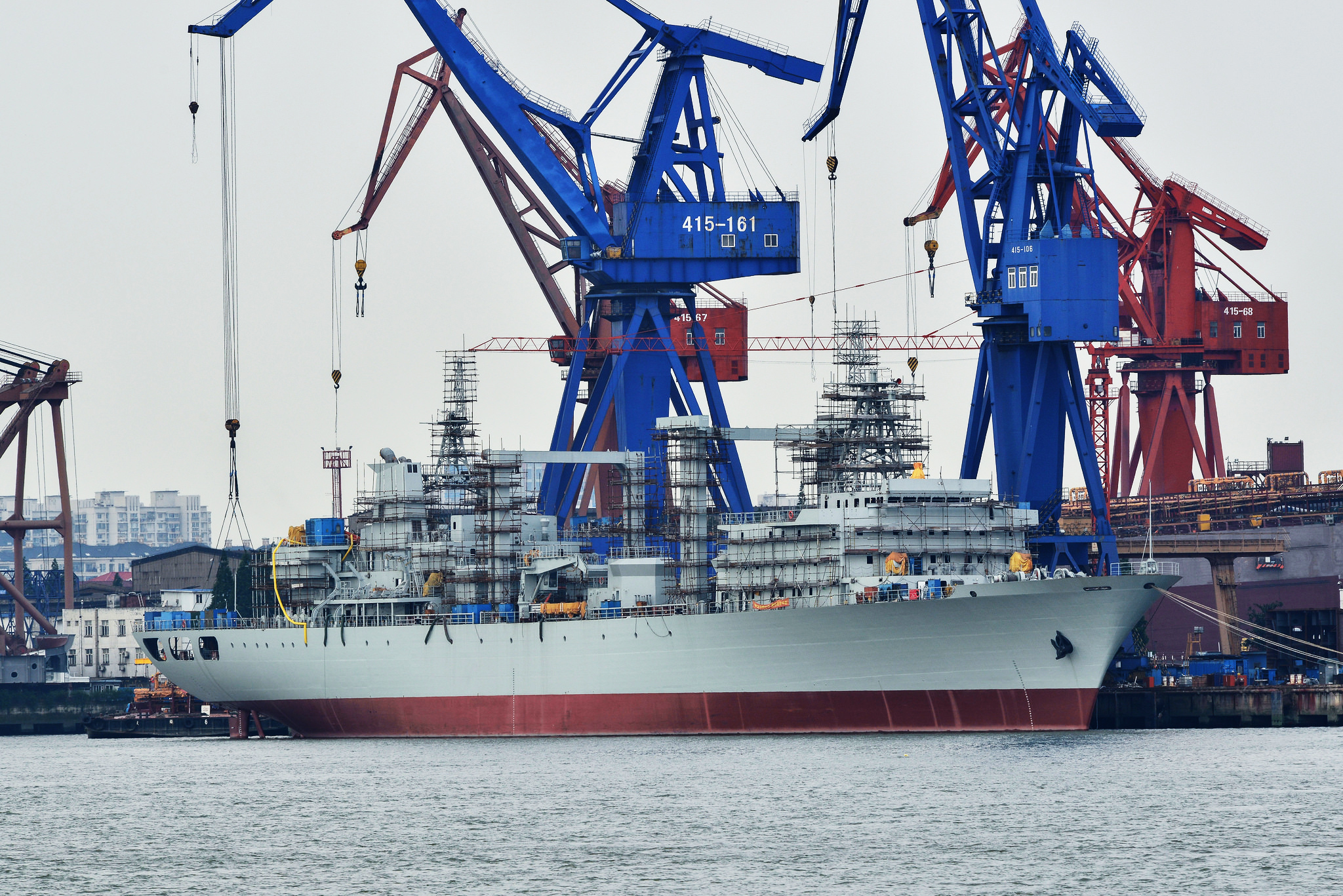
- Luomahu in Shanghai on 28 July 2015

History

China
- Name: Luomahu; (骆马湖)
- Namesake: Luoma Lake
- Builder: Hudong-Zhonghua, Shanghai
- Launched: 5 June 2015
- Commissioned: 15 July 2016
- Identification: Pennant number: 907(ex-964)
- Status: Active

General characteristics
- Class & type: Type 903A replenishment ship
- Displacement: 23,400 tonnes
- Length: 178.5 m (586 ft)
- Beam: 24.8 m (81 ft)
- Draught: 8.7 m (29 ft)
- Propulsion: Two diesels; 24,000 hp (m) (11.9MW) sustained; 2 shafts
- Speed: 20 knots (37 km/h; 23 mph)
- Range: 10,000 nmi (19,000 km; 12,000 mi) at 14 knots (26 km/h; 16 mph)
- Capacity: 10,500 tons of fuel oil; 250 tons of fresh water; 680 tons of cargo and ammunition
- Complement: 130
- Armament: 4 x H/PJ76F twin 37 mm
- Aviation facilities: Hangar; Helipad

Luomahu (907, formerly 964) is a Type 903A replenishment ship of the People's Liberation Army Navy.

== Development and design ==
Type 903 integrated supply ship (NATO called Fuchi-class supply ship) is a new large-scale integrated supply ship of the Chinese People's Liberation Army Navy, designed by Zhang Wende. The later improved model is called 903A. The difference with 903 is that the displacement has increased from 20,530 tons to 23,000 tons.

All 9 ships have been built and are in service. The ship is a new generation of large-scale ocean-going integrated supply ship in China. Its supply equipment has been greatly improved compared to the earlier Type 905 integrated supply ship. It can be used for supply operations in horizontal, vertical, vertical, and sideways. It has two sides, three directions, and four stations. At the same time, the replenishment capability can complete fleet replenishment tasks in more complex situations. And the speed is higher than that of the Qinghaihu built with merchant ships as the standard, with a maximum speed of 20 knots, which can accompany fleet operations. The commissioning of this class of supply ship indicates that the People's Liberation Army Navy has a stable ocean-going combat capability, and this was proved in the subsequent Somalia escort missions. The 903 type integrated supply ship used some Russian equipment in the early stage, and later it was fully localized. This type of supply ship has undergone a comprehensive upgrade of electronic equipment, and has high formation communication capabilities, automatic statistics of materials, and the ability to report to formation command ships.

In the late 1990s, China's integrated supply ship Similan built for the Thai Navy's light aircraft carrier formation is generally considered to be an attempt by China to build a modern integrated supply ship. In the following years, China has learned experience and lessons. Improved on the basis of the Similan, and finally the Type 903 integrated supply ship was designed and finalized by the China State Shipbuilding Corporation.

== Construction ==
She was launched on 5 June 2015 at Hudong-Zhonghua Shipyard in Shanghai and commissioned on 15 July 2016 into the South Sea Fleet.

== Operational history ==
On June 18, 2017, Luomahu, along with the Type 052D destroyer Changsha and the Type 054A frigate Yuncheng, was sent to the Baltic Sea to participate in naval exercises with Russian Navy. Changsha broke down due to propulsion failure in the Indian Ocean on June 26, but the joint exercise still went ahead after another destroy Hefei was sent to replace Changsha for the exercise.

In 2019, the ship took part in anti-piracy operations in the Gulf of Aden. On the return trip in June, it had a four-day stopover in Sydney Harbour, Australia as part of a three-ship task force along with the Type 054A frigate Xuchang and the Type 071 amphibious transport dock Kunlun Shan. According to then-Prime Minister Scott Morrison, the naval visit was invited by the Australian Government, but the neither the New South Wales government nor the Australian public were informed ahead of the task force's arrival, which triggered a media frenzy among the conservative Australian media and politicians on the backdrop of rising geopolitical tension in Sino-Australian relations.

It was deployed in the Gulf of Aden again on 15 January 2022, with the new pennant number "907".

== Gallery ==
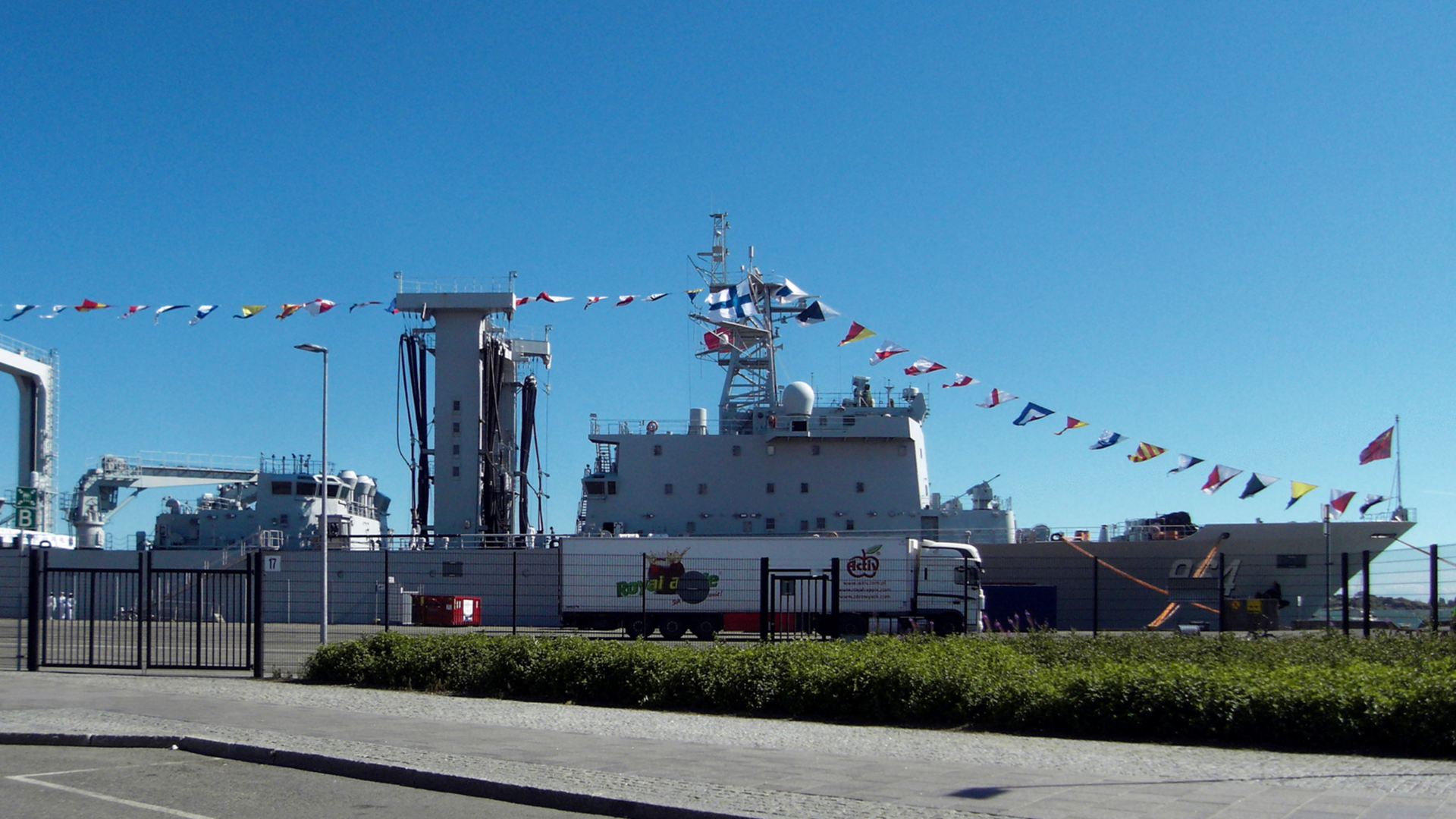
Luomahu in Helsinki on 4 August 2017.
