= Chinese destroyer Lanzhou =

Chinese naval ship

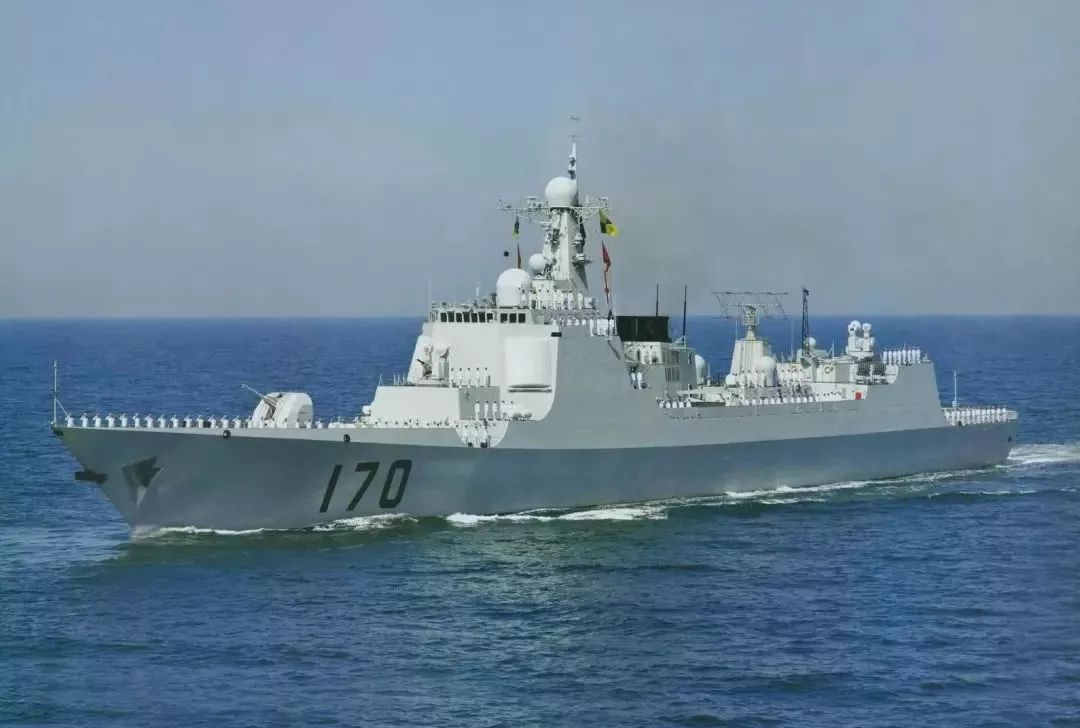
- Lanzhou

History

China
- Name: Lanzhou
- Namesake: Lanzhou
- Laid down: 2002
- Launched: 29 April 2003
- Commissioned: July 2004
- Identification: Hull number: 170
- Status: in active service

General characteristics
- Class & type: Type 052C destroyer
- Displacement: 7,000 tons
- Length: 154 m (505 ft 3 in)
- Beam: 17 m (55 ft 9 in)
- Draught: 6 m (19 ft 8 in)
- Propulsion: CODOG, 57,000 shp (43,000 kW)
- Speed: 30 knots (56 km/h; 35 mph)
- Armament: 48 HHQ-9 long-range surface-to-air missiles; 8 YJ-62 anti-ship / land attack cruise missiles; 1 × 100 mm dual purpose gun; 2 × 30 mm Type 730 close-in weapons systems; 6 torpedo tubes; 4 × 18-tube decoy rocket launcher
- Aircraft carried: 1 helicopter: Kamov Ka-27 or Harbin Z-9C ASW/SAR

Lanzhou is the lead ship of the Chinese Type 052C destroyers (NATO code name Luyang II class). The ship was laid down in late 2002, launched on 29 April 2003, and commissioned in July 2004. The destroyer is active with the People's Republic of China's South Sea Fleet.

== History ==
The ship began construction in June 2001 and was launched in April 2003. She began service in August 2005. At the beginning of 2007, Lanzhou and Haikou, the first batch of Type 052C destroyer in the South China Sea, conducted a combat confrontation drill.

On 23 April 2009, Lanzhou, as one of the new equipment of the People's Liberation Army Navy (PLA Navy), participated in the maritime military parade of the 60th anniversary of the establishment of the Chinese PLA Navy in the Yellow Sea near Qingdao, Shandong Province. In late May 2009, Lanzhou, the Type 071 amphibious transport dock Kunlun Shan, Type 903 replenishment ship Qinghai Hu and Chao Hu, and other special mixed formations conducted a 17-day long-distance mobile combat drill in the South China Sea. The drill set the three records of the longest three-way replenishment time, the largest single ship replenishment, and the largest dry basket replenishment in the PLA Navy.

On 30 June 2010, Lanzhou and Kunlun Shan departed Zhanjiang, Guangdong to relieve the fifth Escort Task Group for the anti-piracy operations in Gulf of Aden and Somalia; the two ships along with the replenishment ship Weishan Hu formed the sixth task group. Lanzhou and Kunlun Shan and sailed about 4,600 nautical miles (8,500 km; 5,300 mi) and arrived in the Gulf of Aden on 14 July 2010 via Xisha, Nansha, Singapore, Malacca Strait, and Indian Ocean. On 14 July 2010, the two task groups met in the western side of the gulf. The escort mission lasted 192 days and ended in January 2011. During the mission, Lanzhou sailed more than 40,000 nautical miles (74,000 km; 46,000 mi) and 4,280 hours of navigation time. She escorted 31 batches of 365 ships of various types and visited Saudi Arabia, Sri Lanka, and Indonesia.

In May 2014, the China National Offshore Oil Corporation drilling platform Offshore Oil 981 was drilling in the disputed Paracel Islands. Due to the disturbance of Vietnamese vessels, Lanzhou was dispatched along with China Coast Guard cutters to confront the Vietnamese vessels and guard the drilling platform. On 25 May 2016, Honghu, Lanzhou and Hefei were seen conducting a replenishment exercise in the Sea of Japan.

On 30 September 2018, the US Navy's Arleigh Burke-class destroyer USS Decatur passed through the waters adjacent to Nanxun Reef in the disputed waters of the South China Sea, and was intercepted by Lanzhou. US Pacific Fleet spokesman Charles Brown said in a statement that the Sino-US warships were less than 45 yards (41 m) away.
