= Wuhan Joint Logistics Support Base =

Main Logistics base of the People's Liberation Army

- 武汉联勤保障基地
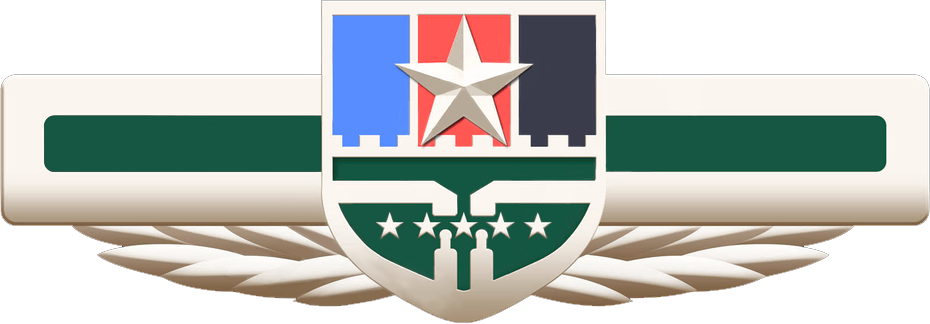
- Patch of the People's Liberation Army Logistics Support Force
- Founded: 2016; 10 years ago
- Country: China
- Allegiance: Chinese Communist Party
- Branch: Joint Logistics Support Force
- Type: Logistics Support
- Role: Logistics
- Part of: People's Liberation Army
- Garrison/HQ: Wuhan, Hubei

Commanders
- Current commander: Maj Gen Li Shisheng (李士生)

The Wuhan Joint Logistics Support Base (武汉联勤保障基地) is the highest organ of the Joint Logistics Support Force, located in Jiang'an district, Wuhan, Hubei.

== History ==
As part of the 2015 Military Reforms, in January 2016, the General Logistics Department of the PLA was dissolved and the Joint Logistics Support Force established as a joint force in charge of centralizing the Chinese military logistics system.

On 13 September 2016, the CMC established the Wuhan Joint Logistics Support Base was chosen as the core organ of the new force, with control over the new five Joint Logistics Support Centers set for each new Theater Commands.

The Base has both a coordination and system construction duties. As an example of the kind of construction tasks carried out by the JLSB, as of 2017 it was designing methods to improve the quality of water available to troops.

== Organization ==
=== Functional Agencies ===
- General Office (参谋部)
- Political Work Office (政治工作部)
- Distribution Bureau (供应局)
- Transport and Delivery Bureau (运输投送局)
- Health Logistics Bureau (卫勤局)
- Warehousing Management Bureau (仓储管理局)
- Military Facilities Construction Bureau (军事设施建设局)
- Science, Engineering, and Informatization Bureau (科技和信息化局)

=== Logistics Support Centers ===
- Wuxi Joint Logistics Support Center (无锡联勤保障中心)
- Guilin Joint Logistics Support Center (桂林联勤保障中心)
- Xining Joint Logistics Support Center (西宁联勤保障中心)
- Shenyang Joint Logistics Support Center (沈阳联勤保障中心)
- Zhengzhou Joint Logistics Support Center (郑州联勤保障中心)
