= Guangxi Military District =

- 中国人民解放军广西军区
- Founded: December 9, 1949; 75 years ago
- Country: People's Republic of China
- Allegiance: Chinese Communist Party
- Type: Military district
- Role: Command and control
- Part of: People's Liberation Army
- Headquarters: Nanning, Guangxi

Commanders
- Commander: Major general (shaojiang) Zhuang Ge
- Political Commisar: Major general (shaojiang) Ma Hui

Chinese name
- Simplified Chinese: 中国人民解放军广西军区
- Traditional Chinese: 中國人民解放軍廣西軍區
Transcriptions
Standard Mandarin
- Hanyu Pinyin: Zhōngguó Rénmín Jiěfàngjūn Guǎngxīshěng Jūnqū

The Guangxi Military District (Chinese: 中国人民解放军广西军区; full name People's Liberation Army Guangxi Military District or PLA Guangxi Military District) is a military district of the National Defense Mobilization Department of the Central Military Commission in China.

== History ==
The Guangxi Military District was established on 9 December 1949.

== Leaders ==
=== Commanders ===
Name (English)	Name (Chinese)	Tenure begins	Tenure ends	Note
Zhang Yunyi	张云逸			
Li Tianyou	李天佑			
Lu Shaowu	卢绍武			
Ou Zhifu	欧致富			
Zhao Xinran	赵欣然			
Zhang Xudeng	张序登			
Li Xinliang	李新良	May 1983	February 1988	
Xiao Xuchu	肖旭初			
Wen Guoqing	文国庆			
Liu Guoyu	刘国裕	1995	2001	
Qiu Daxiong	邱达雄	2001	2004	
Xin Rongguo	辛荣国	2004	2005	
Liu Xiaokun	刘晓琨	January 2005	April 2010	
Wang Yuren	王玉仁	April 2010	March 2011	
Long Yihe	龙义和	March 2011	April 2014	
Xiao Yunhong	肖运洪	April 2014	May 2019	
Chen Yueqi	陈岳琪	May 2019	April 2020	
He Renxue	何仁学	April 2020	January 2024	
Zhuang Ge	庄革	January 2024		

=== Political commissars ===
Name (English)	Name (Chinese)	Tenure begins	Tenure ends	Note
Zhang Yunyi	张云逸	December 1949	July 1952	
Chen Manyuan	陈漫远	July 1952	June 1957	
Liu Jianxun	刘建勋	June 1957	July 1961	
Wei Guoqing	韦国清	July 1961	October 1975	
An Pingsheng	安平生	October 1975	February 1977	
Qiao Xiaoguang	乔晓光	February 1977	June 1985	
Xiao Xuchu	肖旭初	August 1985	April 1988	
Wang Jingbo	王静波	April 1988	December 1991	
Zhang Guochu	张国初	March 1992	February 1993	
Xiong Ziren	熊自仁	May 1993	February 1994	
Gong Pingqiu	龚平秋	February 1994	September 1997	
Zhou Yuqi	周遇奇	September 1997	December 2000	
Zhou Chuantong	周传统	January 2001	July 2004	
Yue Shixin	岳世鑫	July 2004	July 2005	
Liu Liangkai	刘良凯	July 2005	August 2007	
Li Wenchao	李文潮	September 2007	March 2012	
Bai Nianfa	白念法	March 2012	May 2016	
Jiang Yingyu	姜英宇	May 2016	April 2020	
Ma Hui	马辉	April 2020		
