= Zhou Yuqi =

Chinese politician

- 周遇奇

Deputy Political Commissar of the Guangzhou Military Region
- In office December 2004 – January 2008
- Political Commissar: Yang Deqing; Zhang Yang

Personal details
- Born: August 1944 (age 82) Ningxiang County, Hunan, China
- Party: Chinese Communist Party
- Education: PLA Foreign Language College; PLA Political College

Military service
- Allegiance: People's Republic of China
- Branch/service: People's Liberation Army Ground Force
- Years of service: 1961–2008
- Rank: Lieutenant general

Zhou Yuqi (Chinese: 周遇奇; pinyin: Zhōu Yùqí; born August 1944) is a lieutenant general in the People's Liberation Army of China. He was a member of the 16th Central Committee of the Chinese Communist Party. He was a member of the Standing Committee of the 11th Chinese People's Political Consultative Conference.

== Biography ==
Zhou was born in Ningxiang County (now Ningxiang), Hunan, in August 1944. He secondary studied at Jiujiang No. 1 High School.

He enlisted in the People's Liberation Army (PLA) in August 1961, and joined the Chinese Communist Party (CCP) in January 1970. He graduated from the PLA Foreign Language College and PLA Political College. He served in Wuhan Military District from 1974 to 1985. In August 1985, he became deputy head of Organization Division of Political Department of the Guangzhou Military Region, rising to head in July 1988. In May 1993, he was promoted to become director of Political Department of the Guangxi Military District, a position he held until February 1995, when he was chosen as deputy political commissar of the 42nd Group Army (now 74th Group Army). In September 1997, he was elevated to political commissar of Guangxi Military District, and held that office until December 2000. In December 2000, he was recalled to the Guangzhou Military Region and appointed director of Political Department, a post he kept until December 2004, when he was promoted again to become deputy political commissar.

He was promoted to the rank of major general (shaojiang) in July 1995 and lieutenant general (zhongjiang) in July 2002.

Military offices
Preceded by Gong Pingqiu	Political Commissar of the Guangxi Military District; 1997–2000	Succeeded by Zhou Chuantong
