= Wang Kangping =

- 王抗平

Commander of the People's Liberation Army Joint Logistics Support Force
- In office October 2024 – June 2026
- Preceded by: Wang Liyan

Deputy Commander of the Eastern Theater Command
- In office June 2021 – October 2024
- Commander: He Weidong→Lin Xiangyang

Personal details
- Born: Heshan District, Yiyang, Hunan, China
- Party: Chinese Communist Party
- Education: PLA National Defence University

Military service
- Allegiance: People's Republic of China
- Branch/service: People's Liberation Army Air Force
- Rank: Lieutenant general

Wang Kangping (Chinese: 王抗平; pinyin: Wáng Kàngpíng) is a lieutenant general in the People's Liberation Army of China.

He is an alternate of the 20th Central Committee of the Chinese Communist Party.

== Biography ==
Wang was born in Heshan District of Yiyang, Hunan, and graduated from the PLA National Defence University.

Wang once served as commander of the 42nd Division of the PLA Air Force Aviation and deputy chief of staff of the Air Force of Chengdu Military Region.

In December 2017, he was promoted to become commander of the PLA Air Force Weapon Test Base, a position he held until June 2021, when he was commissioned as deputy commander of the Eastern Theater Command.

He was promoted to the rank of major general (shaojiang) in July 2014 and lieutenant general (zhongjiang) in June 2021.

On June 26, 2026, the Standing Committee of the National People's Congress decided to remove Lieutenant General Wang Kangping as a delegate to the 14th National People's Congress.
