= Guilin Logistics Support Center =

Main Logistics Support unit of the Southern Theater of the PLA

Guilin Joint Logistics Support Center
- 桂林联勤保障中心
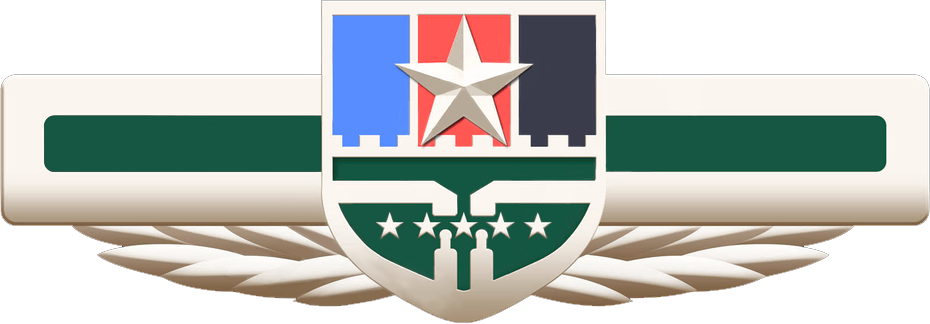
- Founded: 13 September 2016; 9 years ago
- Country: China
- Allegiance: Chinese Communist Party
- Type: Logistics service
- Role: Military logistics
- Part of: People's Liberation Army

Commanders
- Commander: PLAGF Sr Col Shu Yuehua (舒跃华)
- Political Commissar: PLAGF Sr Col Luo Ping (罗平)

Insignia
- Sleeve badge

The Guilin Joint Logistics Support Center (桂林联勤保障中心) located in Guilin, Guangxi Autonomous Region is the local organ of the Joint Logistics Support Force at the Southern Theater Command of the People's Liberation Army.

== History ==
The PLA's 20th Logistics Subunit was established in 1961 at Nanning. In November 1962 it was relocated to Jiashan, Guilin. When the HQ was moved back to Nanning in 1965, the logistic unit remained in Jiashan. In 1975, the unit was given the MUCD of unit 54041.

As part of the 2015 military reforms the Joint Logistics Support Force was established in January 2016. Its principal organ was the Wuhan Joint Logistics Support Base. On 13 September 2016, the five main Joint Logistics Centers at Wuxi, Guilin, Xining, Shenyang and Zhengzhou were established as the subordinate units of the Wuhan JLSB, using the existing logistic units of the Theater Commands.

== Organization ==
- Staff Office (参谋部)
  - Combat Logistics Training Division (战勤训练处)
  - Directly Subordinate Units Division (直属工作处)
- Political Work Department (政治工作部)
  - Information Division (宣传处)
  - Military and Civilian Staff Division (兵员和文职人员处)
- Supply Office (供应处)
- Transport and Distribution Division (运输投送处)
- Field Medicine Division (卫勤处)
- Warehouse Management Division (仓储管理处)
- Military Installation Construction Division (军事设施建设处)
- Science, Engineering and Informatization Division (科技和信息化处)

=== Military Representative Divisions (军事代表办事处) ===
- Military Representative Division at Nanning Railway Bureau (南宁铁路局)
- Guangzhou Navigation Services Military Representative Division (广州航务军事代表办事处)
  - Military Representative Division at the Guangdong Navigation Management Bureau (广东省航务军事代表办事处)
  - Military Representative Division at the Guangxi Navigation Management Bureau (广西航务军事代表办事处)
  - Military Representative Division at Guangzhou Baiyun Airport (广州白云机场)
- Military Representative Division at the Guangxi Coastal Navigation Center (广西沿海军事代表办事处)

=== Directly subordinate units ===
- PLA Southern Theater General Hospital (中国人民解放军南部战区总医院), Guangzhou
- JLSF 920th Hospital (联勤保障部队第九二〇医院), Kunming
- JLSF 921st Hospital (联勤保障部队第九二一医院), Changsha
- JLSF 922nd Hospital (联勤保障部队第九二二医院), Hengyang
- JLSF 923rd Hospital (联勤保障部队第九二三医院), Nanning
- JLSF 924th Hospital (联勤保障部队第九二四医院), Guilin
- JLSF 925th Hospital (联勤保障部队第九二五医院), Guiyang
- JLSF 926th Hospital (联勤保障部队第九二六医院), Kaiyuan
- JLSF 927th Hospital (联勤保障部队第九二七医院), Pu'er
- JLSF 928th Hospital (联勤保障部队第九二八医院), Haikou
- JLSF Guilin Rehabilitation and Recovery Center (桂林康复疗养中心)
- JLSF Sanya Rehabilitation and Recovery Center (三亚康复疗养中心)
- PLA Southern Theater Disease Control and Prevention Command Center (中国人民解放军南部战区疾病预防控制中心)
- Battlefield Pipeline Group (某野战输油管线大队)

== Leadership ==
=== Guilin JLSC Commander ===
1. PLAGF Sr Col Shu Yuehua (舒跃华) (2016年9月—)

=== Guilin JLSC Political Commissar ===
1. PLAGF Sr Col Luo Ping (罗平) (2016年9月—)
