= Chinese destroyer Hefei (174) =

Type 025D destroyer of the PLA Navy

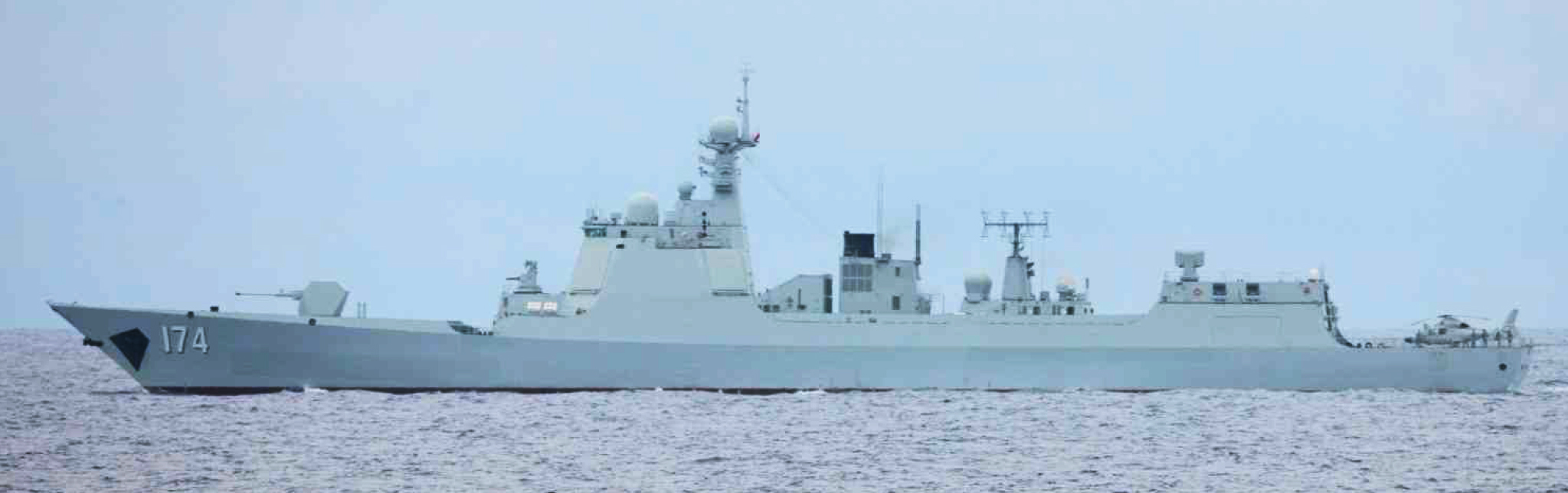
- Hefei on 25 May 2016.

History

China
- Name: Hefei
- Namesake: Hefei; (合肥)
- Builder: Jiangnan Shipyard, Shanghai
- Launched: 1 July 2013
- Commissioned: 12 December 2015
- Identification: Pennant number: 174
- Status: Active

General characteristics
- Class & type: Type 052D destroyer
- Displacement: 7,500 tons (full load)
- Length: 157 m (515 ft)
- Beam: 17 m (56 ft)
- Draught: 6 m (20 ft)
- Propulsion: Combined diesel or gas
- Sensors & processing systems: Type 346 radar; Type 518 radar; Variable depth sonar; Towed array sonar
- Armament: 1 x 130 mm gun; 1 × HQ-10 short-range SAM 24-cell launcher; 64 cell VLS; HHQ-9 SAM; YJ-18 SSM; CY-5 ASW; Type 730 CIWS
- Aircraft carried: Helicopter
- Aviation facilities: Hangar; Helipad

Hefei (174) is a Type 052D destroyer of the People's Liberation Army Navy. She was commissioned on 12 December 2015.

== Development and design ==
The basic ship type and layout of the Type 052D guided-missile destroyer is the same as that of the Type 052C destroyer, but compared to the earlier Type 052C destroyer, the Type 052D superstructure has a larger inclination angle and provides better stealth performance. At the same time, the 052C helicopter hangar is located on the left side of the hull axis, which was changed to the center axis of the ship on Type 052D; a pair of small boat storage compartments was added on both sides of the hangar, similar to the design on the Type 054A frigate.

The close-in weapon system is composed of a H/PJ-12 short-range defense weapon system located in front of the bridge and a 24 Hongqi-10 air defense missile system located on the top of the hangar, which is combined to form a ladder interception. The original 100 mm naval gun was replaced by a higher-located, stealthier model, the H/PJ45 naval gun. On May 13, 2019, the extended version of the 052DL was exposed. The hull of the 052DL is basically the same as the 052D, but the helicopter deck is lengthened to prepare for the Zhi-20 to board the ship.

The Type 52D is the first Chinese surface combatant to use canister-based universal VLS, as opposed to the concentric type VLS carried aboard earlier vessels. 64 cells are carried; 32 forward and 32 aft. The VLS is reportedly an implementation of the GJB 5860-2006 standard. The VLS may fire the extended-range variant of the HHQ-9 surface-to-air missile, YJ-18 anti-ship cruise missiles, and CY-5 anti-submarine missiles.

== Construction and career ==
Hefei was the third ship of the class and launched on 1 July 2013 at the Jiangnan Shipyard in Shanghai. She was commissioned on 12 December 2015.

Hefei and a few other PLA Navy ships conducted an exercise about 360 km south of Yonakunijima and was spotted by JS Akizuki on 25 May 2016.

On 8 February 2018, Hefei transits the South China Sea. She was surveilling the USS Carl Vinson's task force operating nearby.

On 25 May 2016, Honghu, Lanzhou and Hefei were seen conducting a replenishment exercise in the Sea of Japan.

On 26 August 2024, Hefei arrived at the Port of Colombo, Sri Lanka, for a formal visit, accompanied by Wuzhi Shan and Qilian Shan. After completing the official engagement, the three vessels are scheduled to depart the island on 29 August 2024 and conduct a passing exercise with a Sri Lankan naval vessel off the coast of Colombo.
