= Wuxi Joint Logistics Support Center =

Arm of the Chinese People's Liberation Army

- 无锡联勤保障中心
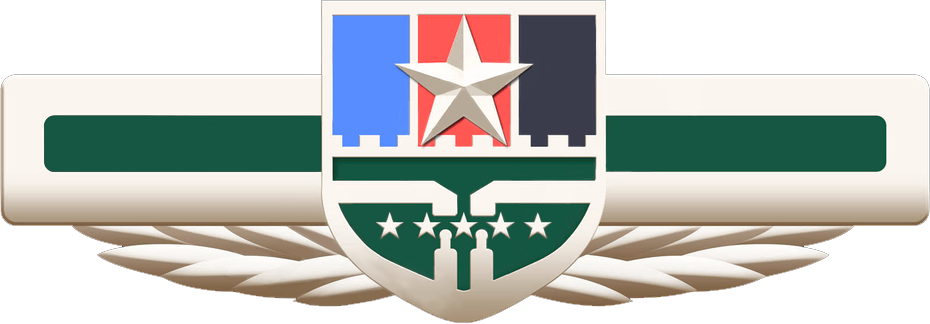
- Founded: 13 September 2016; 9 years ago
- Country: China
- Allegiance: Chinese Communist Party
- Type: Logistics service
- Role: Military logistics
- Part of: People's Liberation Army

Commanders
- Commander: PLAGF Sr Col Hou Zhiping (侯志平)
- Political Commissar: PLAGF Sr Col He Zhengyi (贺正义)

Insignia
- Sleeve badge

The Wuxi Joint Logistics Support Center (无锡联勤保障中心), located at Wuxi, Jiangsu province is the local head organ of the Joint Logistics Support Force at the Eastern Theater Command of the Chinese People's Liberation Army.

== History ==
In June 1962, the Nanjing Military Area established the 13th logistic branch department of the PLA, based in Wuxi, with subordinate bases 63, 64, 65. In August 1975, the unit was given the MUCD Unit 83476.

As part of the 2015 military reforms the Joint Logistics Support Force was established in January 2016. Its principal organ was the Wuhan Joint Logistics Support Base. On 13 September 2016, the five main Joint Logistics Centers at Wuxi, Guilin, Xining, Shenyang and Zhengzhou were established as the subordinate units of the Wuhan JLSB, using the existing logistic units of the Theater Commands.

== Organization ==
- 分部：5个
- General Staff Department (参谋部)
  - Combat Logistics Training Office (战勤训练处)
  - Directly Subordinate Units Office (直属工作处)
- Political Work Department (政治工作部)
  - Information Office (宣传处)
  - Military and Civilian Staff Office (兵员和文职人员处)
- Supply Office (供应处)
- Transport and Distribution Office (运输投送处)
- Field Medicine Office (卫勤处)
- Warehouse Management Office (仓储管理处)
- Military Installations Construction Office (军事设施建设处)
- Science, Technology and Informatization Office (科技和信息化处)

=== Military Representative Offices (军事代表办事处) ===
- Military Representative Office at Nanjing (驻南京军事代表办事处)
- Military Representative Office at Wuxi (驻无锡军事代表办事处)
- Military Representative Office at China Railway Nanchang Group (驻南昌铁路局军事代表办事处)
  - Military Representative Office at CRNG Fuzhou (驻南昌铁路局福州军事代表办事处)
- Military Representative Office at China Railway Shanghai Group (驻上海铁路局军事代表办事处)
  - Military Representative Office at CRSG Hefei (驻上海铁路局合肥军事代表办事处)
  - Military Representative Office at CRSG Hangzhou (驻上海铁路局杭州军事代表办事处)
  - Military Representative Office at CRSG Nanjing (驻上海铁路局南京军事代表办事处)
  - Military Representative Office at CRSG Shanghai (驻上海铁路局上海军事代表办事处)
  - Military Representative Office at CRSG Xuzhou (驻上海铁路局徐州军事代表办事处)
- Navigation Services Military Representative Office (航务军事代表办事处)
  - Military Representative Office at the Fujian Navigation Center (驻福建省航务军事代表办事处)
  - Military Representative Office at the Jiangsu Navigation Center (驻江苏省航务军事代表办事处)
  - Military Representative Office at Shanghai Port (驻上海港]]航务军事代表办事处)

=== Directly subordinate units ===
- PLA Eastern Theater General Hospital (中国人民解放军东部战区总医院), Nanjing
- JLSF 900th Hospital (联勤保障部队第九〇〇医院), Nanjing
- JLSF 901st Hospital (联勤保障部队第九〇一医院), Hefei
- JLSF 902nd Hospital (联勤保障部队第九〇二医院), Bengbu
- JLSF 903rd Hospital (联勤保障部队第九〇三医院), Hangzhou
- JLSF 904th Hospital (联勤保障部队第九〇四医院), Hangzhou
- JLSF 906th Hospital (联勤保障部队第九〇六医院), Ningbo
- JLSF 907th Hospital (联勤保障部队第九〇七医院), Nanping
- JLSF 908th Hospital (联勤保障部队第九〇八医院), Nanchang
- JLSF 909th Hospital (联勤保障部队第九〇九医院), Zhangzhou
- JLSF 910th Hospital (联勤保障部队第九一〇医院), Quanzhou
- JLSF Lushan Rehabilitation and Convalescence Center (联勤保障部队庐山康复疗养中心). Lushan
- Eastern Theater Command Disease Control and Prevention Command Center (东部战区疾病预防控制中心)
- Comprehensive Warehouses (综合仓库)
- POL depots (油料仓库)

== Leadership ==
=== Wuxi JLSC Commander ===
- PLAGF Sr Col Hou Zhiping (侯志平)（2016年9月—）
- PLAGF Sr Col Ren Yanbing (任延兵)

=== Wuxi JLSC Deputy Commanders ===
- Wang Haiping (汪海平)（？—？）

=== Wuxi JLSC Political Commissar ===
- PLAGF Sr Col Xu Xinglin (徐兴林) 2016-9—2017）
- He Zhengyi (贺正义)
