= Chinese landing ship Kunlun Shan =

Type 071 amphibious transport dock

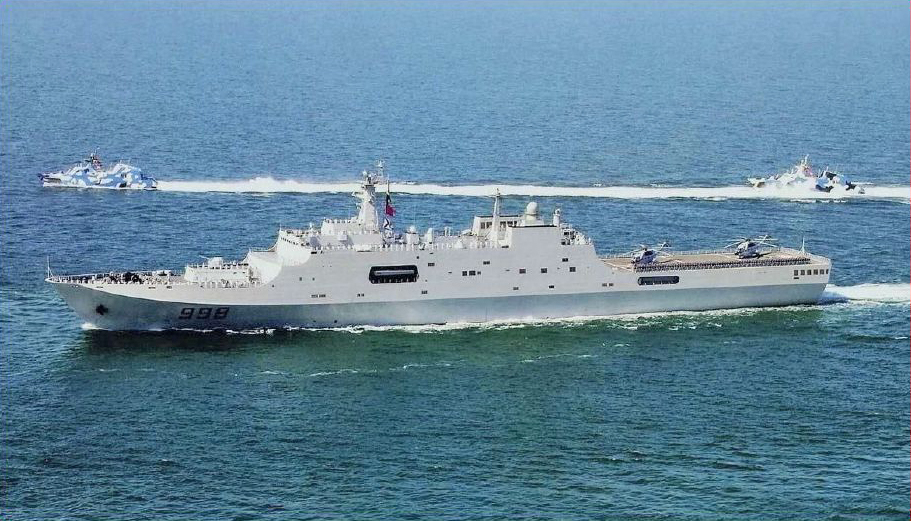
- Kunlun Shan escorted by two Houbei Type 022 missile boats underway (2010)

History

China
- Name: Kunlun Shan (998)(Chinese: 昆仑山)
- Namesake: Kunlun Mountains
- Operator: People's Liberation Army Navy
- Builder: Hudong-Zhonghua shipyard
- Laid down: June 2006
- Launched: 21 December 2006
- Commissioned: 30 November 2007
- Home port: South Sea Fleet, Zhanjiang Naval Base

General characteristics
- Class & type: Type 071 amphibious transport dock
- Displacement: 25,000 tons
- Length: 210 meters
- Beam: 28 meters
- Draught: 7 m (21 ft)
- Propulsion: CODAD; 4 × SEMT Pielstick 16 PC2.6 V400 diesel engines, 47,200 hp (35,197 kW); 2 × shafts
- Speed: 25 knots (46 km/h) max
- Range: 10,000 nmi (19,000 km) at 18 knots (33 km/h; 21 mph)
- Boats & landing craft carried: 4 × air-cushioned landing craft; 2 × landing craft on port/starboard davits
- Capacity: 15-20 armoured vehicles
- Troops: 500-800 troops
- Crew: 120
- Sensors & processing systems: 1 × Type 360 Radar Seagull S, E/F-band surface search radar; 1 × Type 364 Radar, Seagull C, G-band air search radar aft; 1 × Type 344 Radar, I band fire control radar; 1 × navigational radar
- Electronic warfare & decoys: UAT Electronic Support Measures
- Armament: 1 × AK-176 76 mm (3.0 in) gun; 4 × AK-630 30 mm (1.2 in) CIWS; 4 × 18-tube Type 726-4 decoy/chaff launcher; Possible installation of 2-4 heavy machine guns (Fitted for but not with)
- Aircraft carried: 2-4 Z-8 Super Frelon

Kunlun Shan is a Type 071 amphibious transport dock ship currently in service to China's People's Liberation Army Navy. The lead ship of its class, the 25,000-ton ship was laid down in the Hudong-Zhonghua Shipbuilding in Shanghai in June 2006, and was launched on 21 December 2006. After finishing sea trials the ship was commissioned to the South Sea Fleet at Zhanjiang Naval Base on 30 November 2007. Its estimated production cost is 300 million USD.

The ship is named after of the Kunlun Mountains, one of the most prominent mountain ranges in Northwest China.

== Operational history ==
On 9 March 2014, the ship was deployed in the search for the missing Malaysia Airlines Flight 370.

In September 2016, the ship took part in combined naval exercises with the Russian Navy off the coasts of Guangdong.

In 2019, the ship took part in anti-piracy operations in the Gulf of Aden. On the return trip in June, it had a four-day stopover in Sydney Harbour, Australia as part of a three-ship taskforce along with the Type 054A frigate Xuchang and the Type 903 replenishment ship Luomahu. According to then-Prime Minister Scott Morrison, the naval visit was invited by the Australian Government, but the neither the New South Wales government nor the Australian public were informed ahead of the taskforce's arrival, which triggered a media frenzy among the conservative Australian media and politicians on the backdrop of rising geopolitical tension in Sino-Australian relations.
