= People's Liberation Army Joint Logistics Support Force =

Logistics support arm of the People's Liberation Army

- 中国人民解放军联勤保障部队
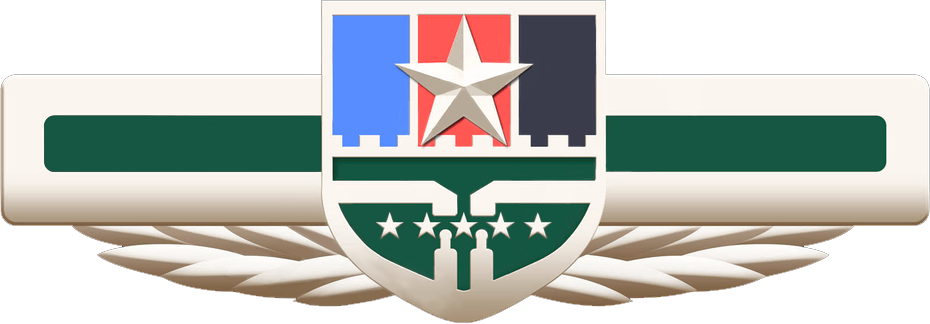
- Founded: 13 September 2016; 10 years ago
- Country: China
- Allegiance: Chinese Communist Party
- Type: Logistics service
- Role: Military logistics
- Part of: People's Liberation Army
- Garrison/HQ: Wuhan Joint Logistics Support Base

Commanders
- Commander: Lieutenant General Wang Kangping
- Political Commissar: Vacant

Insignia
- Flag

- Sleeve badge

People's Liberation Army Joint Logistics Support Force
- Simplified Chinese: 中国人民解放军联勤保障部队
- Traditional Chinese: 中國人民解放軍聯勤保障部隊
Transcriptions
Standard Mandarin
- Hanyu Pinyin: Zhōngguó rénmín jiěfàngjūn lián qín bǎozhàng bùduì

The People's Liberation Army Joint Logistics Support Force is the rear echelon and logistics arm of the People's Liberation Army. It was established on 13 September 2016 and was recognized as an arm of the People's Liberation Army on 19 April 2024, with a Deputy Theater grade.

The JLSF was formed by integrating elements of the former General Logistics Department of the People's Liberation Army and the logistics components of the former Military Districts. It is structured around a central "Logistics Base" in Wuhan (a major transport hub, located very close to the "weight center" of China) and five joint logistics support centers assigned to each of the five Theater Commands.

== History ==
The centralization of PLA logistics into a single system has been attempted a number of times since the 1950s. In 1952, the separate supply systems for the army, navy, and air force were nominally unified under the leadership of the "General Rear Area Services Department" (later named the General Logistics Department, or GLD). Between 1965 and 1985, the PLA attempted five times to implement an effective joint logistics command, efforts that went unrealized.

It was the PLA's 1998 joint operations reforms under Jiang Zemin that started to carry out actual command integration. By 2002, Joint Logistics Departments (JLDs) were established under each Military Region. These JLDs unified most "general" transportation, medical, and material support, as well as infrastructure construction, equipment procurement, and paymaster functions under one headquarters. The four PLA services maintained their "specialized" support and logistics units. By 2005, as part of one of the PLA's force reductions, eight division-grade logistics organizations, 94 rear depots, 47 hospitals, and nearly 2,000 other support organizations were eliminated. A civilian cadre system was instituted to further reduce active-duty military manpower requirements. These reforms allowed the PLA to demobilize 135,000 troops.

In December 2007, the CMC directed that logistics should fully transition to a joint logistics system by 2020. The Jinan Military Region was the one chosen to experiment, by operating an integrated logistic system at region level, providing experience for a PLA-wide reform. In 2013, the PLA set up the All-Military Logistics Information Center in Beijing to better integrate the logistics information system and introduce system standards.

The Military Regions operated separated logistics systems for shared and for service-specific requirements between 2009 and 2015, with the exception of Jinan. There were, however, experiments on centralized theater-level logistics command structures during military exercises to provide experience on integrated logistics systems. Efforts to mature the informatization of logistic systems were also part of this process of evolution, with the intent to link all logistic tasks vertically and horizontally through the advanced IT systems.

This process of centralization and consolidation was continued in the wide-ranging 2015 military reforms, and the Joint Logistics Support Force was established on 13 September 2016, originally as a Corps-grade unit under the command of the Military Commission Joint Staff Department and the leadership and management of the Military Commission Logistics Support Department (LSD), creating a division between the LSD administrative role and the JLSF operational responsibility. After the establishment of the LSD, the department seemed to continue the GLD responsibilities of PLA-wide strategic logistics planning, material management and procurement, facilities management, contracting, budget management and funds disbursement, international military engagement, and overall administration of PLA hospitals and medical programs.

With the shift on emphasis on civil-military integration, the LSD was also tasked with improving the mechanisms to draw support from China's commercial enterprises to support PLA logistics operations, develop technologies to enhance logistics planning and execution, and improve logistics support equipment. For instance, the military representative offices of the various Military Areas to the civilian train and transportation bureaus were transferred to the JLSCs.

The JLSF was raised to Theater Deputy-grade in 2017, and put under the direct control of the CMC. All the units consolidated under the JLSF were administratively still under the LSD, but the relationship between the two major units became more coordinated than hierarchical.

On 24 July 2019, the government white paper "China's National Defense in the New Era" published by the State Council Information Office stated that "the joint logistics support force is the main force for implementing joint logistics support and strategic campaign support, and is the core of the modern military force system with Chinese characteristics. This includes warehousing, medical services, transportation and delivery, oil pipelines, engineering construction management, reserve asset management, procurement and other support forces."

With the establishment of the JLSF, the CMC separated logistics management responsibilities (resource management, unit construction, and regulatory activities), from combat service support (sustainment)). The LSD theoretically should focus on logistics management, personnel training, and infrastructure construction (such as the database management systems and creating other IT standards), while the JSFL provides combat service and active front-line units and processes construction. This is consistent with the standard 2015 Reform intention to separate war-fighting duties from force construction and ordinary management.

However, the creation of the JLSF was also prima facie against the plan to unify all-branch joint operations on the Theater Command. After the reforms, the relationship between the JLSC and the Theater Command field service logistics remained unclear to most analysts. There is no explicit JLSC command representative in the TC HQ, and the TC HQ are located in a different city than the JLSC centers (except for Shenyang). Whether the JLSC's will be able to directly command the specialized service logistics units when necessary, or if they will need to go through the TC command is also unclear. Wuthnow suggest that this apparent unclarity may be an intentional effort to figure out the most effective mechanisms of coordination through experimentation.

The JLSF was further raised to a full PLA "Arm" (兵种) in April 2024. There were no signs in the initial announcement whether the change in denomination will significantly change its status or which units it controls.

== Mission ==
The main mission of the JLSF is to reorganize the logistics system of the PLA into a system capable of fast-paced joint operations. For this purpose, the JLSF has focused on improving joint operations, joint training, and joint support capabilities, including the critical element of military-civilian integration. The JLSF is not meant to eliminate the specialized logistics support from the services own units, but rather to create a consolidated general logistics system that can achieve as many efficiencies as possible.

According to PLA authors, an ideal joint logistics support system:

- provides precision logistics support for high-tempo, dynamic joint combat operations
- achieves strategic unity of effort by implementing an integrated joint logistics command system that is itself fully integrated with a strategic joint operations command system
- leverages the full potential of China's comprehensive national power through civil-military fusion to maximize combat power, ensure peacetime efficiencies, and maintain a constant state of combat readiness.

The JLSF is under the direct command of the CMC, but under the "guidance" of the Logistic Support Department, and it is responsible both for the construction of logistic structures and mechanisms, and for directly support joint operations in each Theater in case of war. The JLSF focuses on planning and executing integrated joint logistics support for strategic and campaign operations, providing centralized and decentralized support as required, as well as developing joint logistics tactics, and carrying out research and experimentation.

The JLSF joint logistics is intended to provide the main support infrastructure of the PLA, with a division of responsibilities between the central general support duties of the JLSF and the specialized, service-specific support provided by the frontline support units affiliated to each service. PLA modernization analysis also identified the need to develop and strengthen large logistics support centers embedded with information technologies to improve efficiency and timeliness. These centers are intended to rapidly respond to emergency situations requiring large-scale logistics support. Reliance on military or civilian ground, air and sea delivery capabilities are important for effective logistics support for operations within China or abroad. For this purposes, logistics personnel from the five centers are sent to the theater commands to better understand operational missions and requirements to develop logistics support plans and support theater joint exercises.

After the establishment of the Joint Logistics Support Force, all hospitals, sanatoriums, warehouses, etc. of the Joint Logistics Support Force are administratively units directly under the Logistics Support Department of the Central Military Commission, but under the operational control of the various JLSCs. The transfer of depots, warehouses, transport units and logistic units, and medical facilities has not been homogeneous, with most branches retaining significant organic logistics establishments organized as specialized units. The degree of coordination power of the JLSF with the Theater Commands is still limited.

The main role of the JLSF is intended to be to develop effective protocols and structures for operational logistic tasks. For instance, the JLSF remit includes developing the structures for rapid troop transportation and medevac of casualties.

The dual system of LSD and JLSF management is also intended to focus on identifying efficiencies, streamlining bureaucratic processes, and critically, identifying and suppressing opportunities for corruption and waste.

Training and preparation of the various logistics units to operate in wartime conditions is also one of the main tasks of the JLSF, exemplified by the regular "Jingwu Joint Logistics combat skills competition" and the Joint Logistics Mission cross-theater exercises that mainly feature logistics field units carrying out wargames and simulations. Military-Civilian coordination is a critical mission that has entailed that each Center appoints permanent representative at the regional railway bureaus, and the highway management authorities for transport coordination. Informatization of supply chains is naturally a critical task, combined with BeiDou real-time tracking of materiel. The JLSF has established a Big Data Center to improve on database management and civil supply chains integration.

Consolidating and centralizing logistics command require more than just organizational reforms; it also requires the integration of logistics information systems to provide logisticians with timely and accurate information on the location, movement, status, and identity of units, personnel, equipment, material, and supplies.6 For the PLA, this requirement also extends to civilian resources and demands standardized catalogs of available resources and associated attributes, regulations for military procurement, joint equipment development, and knowledge transfer. All of these objectives are enabled through integrated information systems.7

The JLSF is not intended to replace the entire logistics structure of the PLA. For example, each group army has its own joint logistics support brigade, which as a combat unit is still a PLAGF unit, but it coordinates with the Theater's JLSC.

Recent assessments by the CMC have found that after five years of the 2015-17 reforms, there are still significant problems, both specific and structural. These problems include: inadequate staff sizes, low transportation equipment numbers, inefficient logistics processes, a lack of containerization, and challenged civil-military integration. There is also a continuing conflict between the desire of the various branches (like the PLARF) to create specialized units dedicated to their specific logistics need, and the desire to create coordinate, joint logistics operations. The JLSCs are Corps Deputy Leader-grade organizations that report to the JLSF, and cannot overrule units of similar grade such as the PLARF Bases.

== Organization ==
The basic structure of the PLA JLSF is the central role of the Wuhan JLSC as the logistics coordinator of the whole PLA, and the five theater based Joint Logistics Support Centers theater-specific roles. Each Joint Center comprises units, facilities, and functions to provide various types of logistics support:

1. contingency logistics support brigades (后勤应急保障旅);
2. medical support including hospitals and mobile medical units;
3. motor transport and heavy equipment transport units;
4. petroleum, oil and lubricant (POL) depots, oil pipeline groups (输油管线大队), and field fuel station detachments (野战加油站分队);
5. ammunition depots;
6. quartermaster depots;
7. maintenance and repair;
8. finance;
9. construction of military facilities.

The centers also have direct representatives in civilian agencies that can mobilize civilian transport services such as rail, motor, air, and maritime transport, as well as mobilizing other civilian assets such as maintenance or construction.

The joint logistics system is responsible for supplying general items that are used by all the services. The equipment support function that had been responsible for maintenance and repair appears to be now included in the joint logistics system. Service (Army, Navy, Air Force, and Rocket Force) logistics are responsible for service-specific logistics requirements

The subordinate units of the PLA-JLSF are as follow:

=== Functional Departments ===
- General Staff Department (参谋部)
- Political Work Department (政治工作部)
- Commission for Discipline Inspection (纪律检查委员会/监察委员会）

=== Directly subordinate units ===
- People's Liberation Army General Hospital (中国人民解放军总医院)
- Academy of Military Medical Sciences (中国人民解放军军事科学院军事医学研究院)

=== Directly subordinate logistics centers ===
- Wuhan Logistics Support Base
  - Wuxi Joint Logistics Support Center (无锡联勤保障中心)
  - Guilin Joint Logistics Support Center (桂林联勤保障中心)
  - Xining Joint Logistics Support Center (西宁联勤保障中心)
  - Shenyang Joint Logistics Support Center (沈阳联勤保障中心)
  - Zhengzhou Joint Logistics Support Center (郑州联勤保障中心)

== Leadership ==
=== Commander ===
- Li Yong (July 2017 – August 2021)
- Wang Liyan (August 2021 – October 2024)
- Wang Kangping (October 2024 – present)

=== Political Commissar ===
- Xu Zhongbo (December 2017 – July 2020)
- Wang Wenquan (September 2020 – December 2023)
- Gao Daguang (August 2024 – October 2025)
