= Zhengzhou Joint Logistics Support Center =

Arm of the Chinese People's Liberation Army

- 郑州联勤保障中心
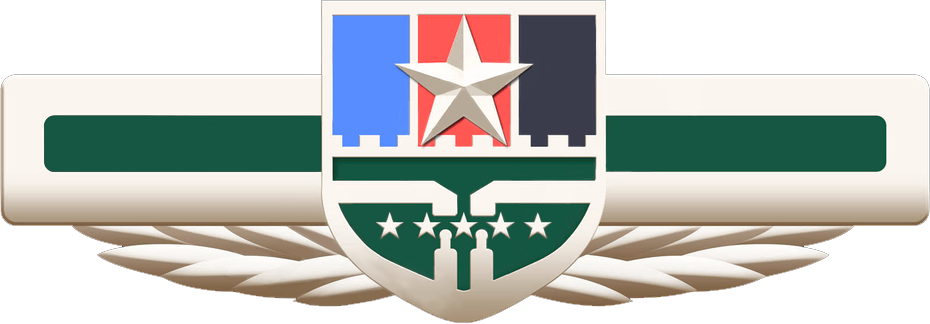
- Founded: 13 September 2016; 9 years ago
- Country: China
- Allegiance: Chinese Communist Party
- Type: Logistics service
- Role: Military logistics
- Part of: People's Liberation Army

Commanders
- Commander: PLAGF Sr Col Jia Quanlin (贾全林)
- Political Commissar: PLAGF Sr Col Liu Xiangdong (刘向东)

Insignia
- Sleeve badge

The Zhengzhou Joint Logistics Support Center (郑州联勤保障中心) located in Zhengzhou, Henan Province is a local operational organ of the Joint Logistics Support Force at the Central Command of the Chinese People's Liberation Army, and is Corps Deputy grade.

== History ==
In November 1977, the Wuhan Military District established the 33rd Logistics Branch (MUCD Unit 34603), based on the Linru Base Depot (MUCD Unit 34550), located in Zhengzhou. In November 1985 it was transferred to the General Logistics Department of the PLA and renamed the "First Strategic Rear Base of the General Logistics Department" (MUCD Unit 59191). In March 1994, the First Strategic Rear Base of the Base Command of the General Logistics Department of the Chinese People's Liberation Army and its affiliated warehouses in Henan Province were transferred to the Logistics Department of the Jinan Military Region and renamed the 33rd Logistics Branch of the PLA (Unit 55201). In June 1999, it was renamed the 33rd Joint Logistics Division of the PLA, still stationed in Zhengzhou City.

As part of the 2015 military reforms the Joint Logistics Support Force was established in January 2016. Its principal organ was the Wuhan Joint Logistics Support Base. On 13 September 2016, the five main Joint Logistics Centers at Wuxi, Guilin, Xining, Shenyang and Zhengzhou were established as the subordinate units of the Wuhan JLSB, using the existing logistic units of the Theaters.

== Organization ==
- General Staff Department (参谋部)
  - Combat Logistics Training Office (战勤训练处)
  - Directly Subordinate Units Office (直属工作处)
- Political Work Department (政治工作部)
  - Information Office (宣传处)
  - Military and Civilian Staff Office (兵员和文职人员处)
- Supply Office (供应处)
- Transport and Distribution Office (运输投送处)
- Field Medicine Office (卫勤处)
- Warehouse Management Office (仓储管理处)
- Military Facilities Construction Office (军事设施建设处)
- Science, Engineering and Informatization Office (科技和信息化处)

=== Military Representative Offices (军事代表办事处) ===
- Military Representative Office at the Beijing Railway Bureau (驻北京铁路局军事代表办事处)
- Military Representative Office at the Xi'an Railway Bureau (驻西安铁路局军事代表办事处)

=== Directly subordinate units ===
- PLA Central Theater General Hospital (中国人民解放军中部战区总医院), Wuhan
- JLSF 980th Hospital (联勤保障部队第九八〇医院), Shijiazhuang
- JLSF 981st Hospital (联勤保障部队第九八一医院), Chengde
- JLSF 982nd Hospital (联勤保障部队第九八二医院), Tangshan
- JLSF 983rd Hospital (联勤保障部队第九八三医院), Tianjin
- JLSF 984th Hospital (联勤保障部队第九八四医院), Beijing
- JLSF 985th Hospital (联勤保障部队第九八五医院), Taiyuan
- JLSF 987th Hospital (联勤保障部队第九八七医院), Baoji
- JLSF 988th Hospital (联勤保障部队第九八八医院), Jiaozuo
- JLSF 989th Hospital (联勤保障部队第九八九医院), Pingdingshan
- JLSF 990th Hospital (联勤保障部队第九九〇医院), Madian
- JLSF 991st Hospital (联勤保障部队第九九一医院), Xiangyang
- JLSF Beidaihe Rehabilitation and Convalescence Center (军联勤保障部队北戴河康复疗养中心), Beidaihe
- JLSF Lintong Rehabilitation and Convalescence Center (联勤保障部队临潼康复疗养中心), Lintong
- JLSF Tianjin Rehabilitation and Convalescence Center (联勤保障部队天津康复疗养中心), Tianjin
- Central Theater Disease Control and Prevention Command Center (中部战区疾病预防控制中心), Shijingshan, Beijing
- Distribution Base (投送基地)

== Leadership ==
=== Zhengzhou JLSC Commanders ===
1. Sr Col Jia Quanlin (贾全林)（2016-9—）

=== Zhengzhou JLSC Deputy Commanders ===
1. Cui Hongjun (崔红军)（2016—）

=== Zhengzhou JLSC Political Commissars ===
1. PLAGF Sr Col Liu Xiangdong (刘向东)(2016-9—)

=== Zhengzhou JLSC Deputy Political Commissars ===
1. Wang Qingyun (王青云)（2016—）
