= Shenyang Joint Logistics Support Center =

Logistics support main unit of the Northern theater of the PLA

- 沈阳联勤保障中心
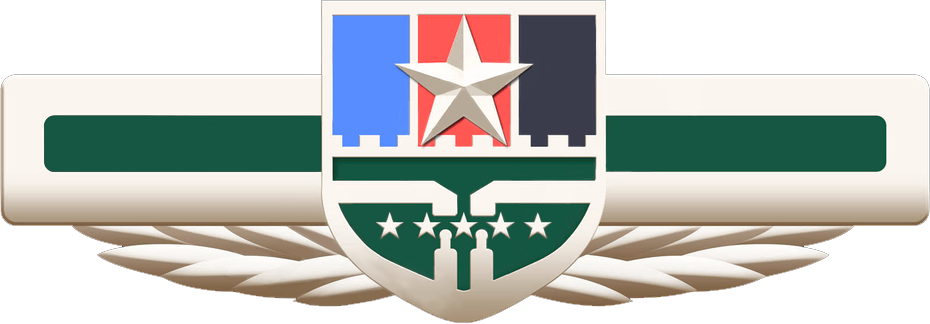
- Founded: 13 September 2016; 9 years ago
- Country: China
- Allegiance: Chinese Communist Party
- Type: Logistics service
- Role: Military logistics
- Part of: People's Liberation Army

Commanders
- Commander: PLAGF Sr Col Zhu Man (朱满)
- Political Commissar: PLAGF Sr Col Huang Tianxin (黄天信)

Insignia
- Sleeve badge

The Shenyang Joint Logistics Support Center (沈阳联勤保障中心) located in Shenyang, Liaoning Province is the local operational organ of the Joint Logistics Support Force at the Northern Command of the People's Liberation Army, with a Corps Deputy grade.

== History ==
In November 1961, the second logistic branch was established in Shenyang. In March 1968 it was renamed Unit 439, and in August 1975 it was given the MUCD of unit 81875. In 1999 it was renamed as the 2nd Logistic Branch.

As part of the 2015 military reforms the Joint Logistics Support Force was established in January 2016. Its principal organ was the Wuhan Joint Logistics Support Base. On 13 September 2016, the five main Joint Logistics Centers at Wuxi, Guilin, Xining, Shenyang and Zhengzhou were established as the subordinate units of the Wuhan JLSB, using the existing logistic units of the Theaters.

== Organization ==
- General Staff Department (参谋部)
  - Combat Logistics Training Office (战勤训练处)
  - Directly Subordinate Units Office (直属工作处)
- Political Work Department (政治工作部)
  - Information Office (宣传处)
  - Military and Civilian Staff Official (兵员和文职人员处)
- Supply Office (供应处)
- Transport and Distribution Office (运输投送处)
- Field Medicine Office (卫勤处)
- Warehouse Administration Office (仓储管理处)
- Military Installations Construction Office (军事设施建设处)
- Science, Technology and Informatization Office (科技和信息化处)

=== Military Representative Offices (军事代表办事处) ===
- Military Representative Office at the Shenyang Railway Bureau (驻沈阳铁路局军事代表办事处)
  - Military Representative Office at Daqingdong Station (驻大庆东站军事代表办事处)
- Military Representative Office at Harbin Railway Bureau (驻哈尔滨铁路局军事代表办事处)
- Military Representative Office at Hohhot Railway Bureau (驻呼和浩特铁路局军事代表办事处)
- Military Representative Office for Rail and Water Transport at Jinan (驻济南铁路水路军事代表办事处)

=== Directly subordinate units ===
- PLA Northern Theater General Hospital (中国人民解放军北部战区总医院), Shenyang
- JLSF 960th Hospital (联勤保障部队第九六〇医院), Jinan
- JLSF 961st Hospital (联勤保障部队第九六一医院), Qiqihar
- JLSF 962nd Hospital (联勤保障部队第九六二医院), Harbin
- JLSF 963rd Hospital (联勤保障部队第九六三医院), Jiamusi
- JLSF 964th Hospital (联勤保障部队第九六四医院), Changchun
- JLSF 965th Hospital (联勤保障部队第九六五医院), Jilin
- JLSF 966th Hospital (联勤保障部队第九六六医院), Dandong
- JLSF 967th Hospital (联勤保障部队第九六七医院), Dalian
- JLSF 968th Hospital (联勤保障部队第九六八医院), Chaoyang City
- JLSF 969th Hospital (联勤保障部队第九六九医院), Hohhot
- JLSF 970th Hospital (联勤保障部队第九七〇医院), Yantai
- JLSF Dalian Rehabilitation and Convalescence Center (联勤保障部队大连康复疗养中心)
- PLA Northern Theater Disease Control and Prevention Command Center (中国人民解放军北部战区疾病预防控制中心)

== Leadership ==
=== Shenyang JLSC Commanders ===
1. PLAGF Sr Col Zhu Man (朱满)（2016—）

=== Shenyang JLSC Deputy Commanders ===
1. Tang Longqing (唐龙清)（2016—）

=== Shenyang JLSC Political Commissars ===
1. PLAGF Sr Col Huang Tianxin (黄天信)（2016-9—）
