= China Marine Surveillance South China Sea Fleet =

China Marine Surveillance South China Sea Fleet (Chinese: 中国海监南海总队) was a fleet of the China Marine Surveillance under the State Oceanic Administration. It was disbanded and merged into the China Coast Guard on July 2013 along with the China Marine Surveillance.

== Overview ==
The fleet was headquartered at Guangzhou, Guangdong.

== Organization ==
- 7th Marine Surveillance Flotilla (Chinese: 中国海监第七支队). Homeport: Haizhu, Guangzhou, Guangdong.
- 8th Marine Surveillance Flotilla (Chinese: 中国海监第八支队). Homeport: Huangpu, Guangzhou, Guangdong.
- 9th Marine Surveillance Flotilla (Chinese: 中国海监第九支队. Homeport: Beihai, Guangxi.
- South China Sea Air Wing (Chinese: 中国海监南海航空支队). Base:?
