= ROKS Soyang =

ROKS Soyang is the name of two Republic of Korea Navy warships:

- ROKS Soyang (AOG-55), a Rincon-class gasoline tanker from 1982-1990s.
- ROKS Soyang (AOE-51), a Soyang-class fast combat support ship from 2018-present.
