= ROKS Hwacheon =

Cheonji-class fast combat support ship

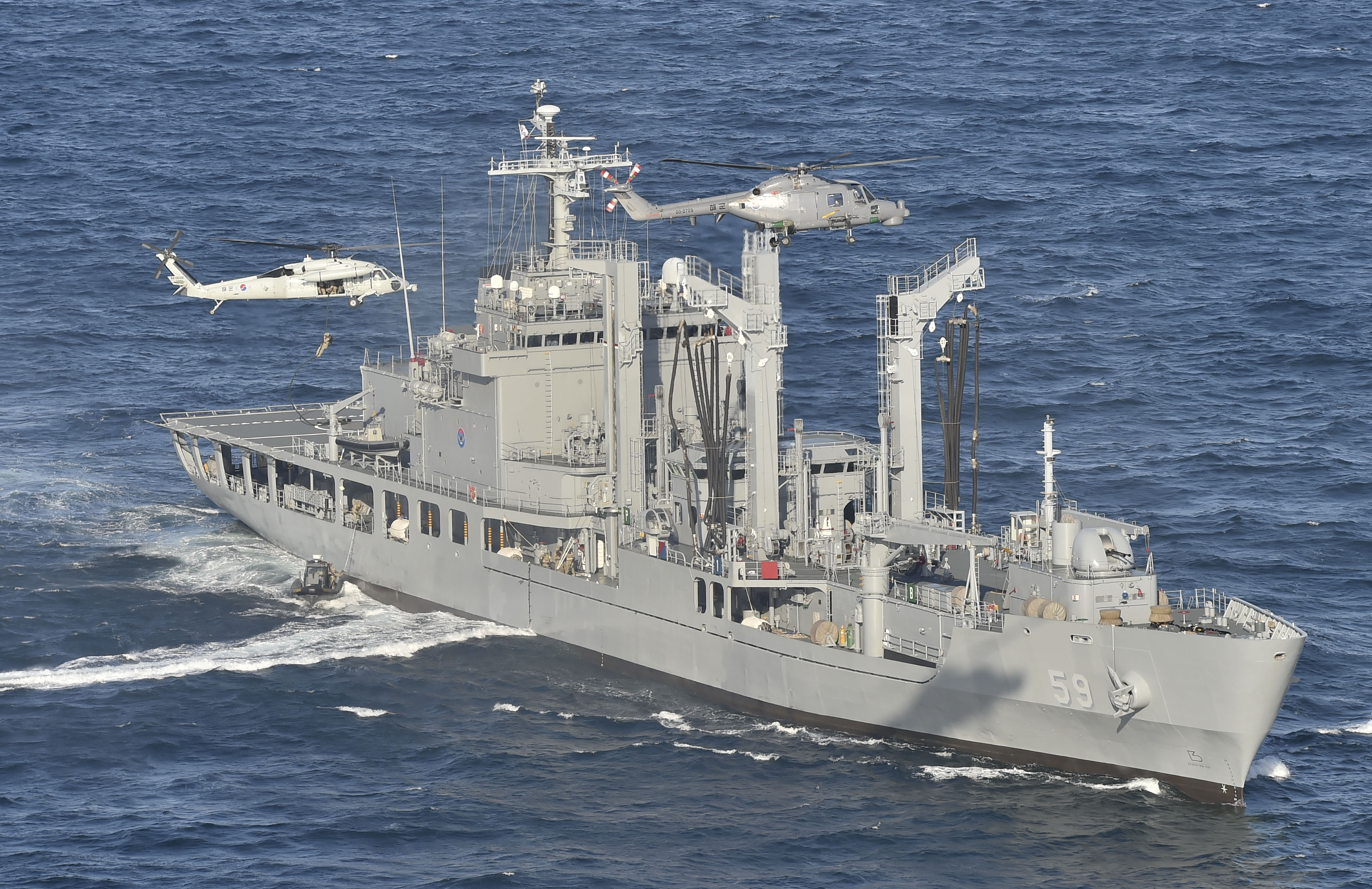
- ROKS Hwacheon on 17 October 2015

History

South Korea
- Name: Hawcheon; (화천)
- Namesake: Hwacheon
- Builder: Hyundai
- Launched: 1997
- Commissioned: 1998
- Identification: MMSI number: 440800061; Callsign: HLGL; Pennant number: AOE-59
- Status: Active

General characteristics
- Class & type: Cheonji-class fast combat support ship
- Displacement: 4,200 tonnes (4,134 long tons) light; 9,113 tonnes (8,969 long tons) full load
- Length: 133.7 m (438 ft 8 in)
- Beam: 17.8 m (58 ft 5 in)
- Draft: 6.8 m (22 ft 4 in)
- Propulsion: 2 × Voith Schneider Propeller
- Speed: 20 knots (37 km/h; 23 mph)
- Range: 4,500 nmi (8,300 km)
- Sensors & processing systems: 2 × Anti-ship radar
- Armament: 1 × 20 mm cannon; 1 × 40 mm cannon; DAGAIE
- Aviation facilities: Helipad

ROKS Hwacheon (AOE-59) is the third ship of the Cheonji-class fast combat support ship (AOE) in the Republic of Korea Navy. She is named after the lake, Hwacheon.

== Development ==
After the Korean War, the Korean Navy purchased and operated small refueling ships from the 1960s to the 1980s. These ships were obsolete due to prolonged operation, which forced their retirement beginning in the late 1970s. As the demand for maritime operations increased day, the Navy required vessels to complete the missions.

From the mid-1980s, based on ship drying experiences, the Korean Navy proposed building combat support ships domestically. From 1988 to 1990, the first combat support ship, later named Cheonji, was built and launched.Daecheong and Hwacheon were built seven years later. At the time, the Korean Navy decided whether or not to build follow-up ships after finishing the operation test of the first ship.

As the needs of support ships increased, the Navy designed the Soyang-class ships in 2016, based on the Cheonji class.

== Construction and career ==
ROKS Hwacheon was launched in 1997 by Hyundai Heavy Industries and commissioned in 1998. She was the third logistic support ship built by the Navy.

In November 2007, ROKS Hwacheon and ROKS Chungmugong Yi Sun-sin made a visit to New York, USA.

ROKS Hwacheon and ROKS Yang Man-chun made a three-day goodwill visit to Auckland, New Zealand on 22 August 2010.

In September 2013 ROKS Hwacheon and ROKS Dae Jo-yeong attended the DSEI Defence and Security Equipment International event hosted at Excel London in Royal Victoria Dock in London Borough of Newham.

== Gallery ==
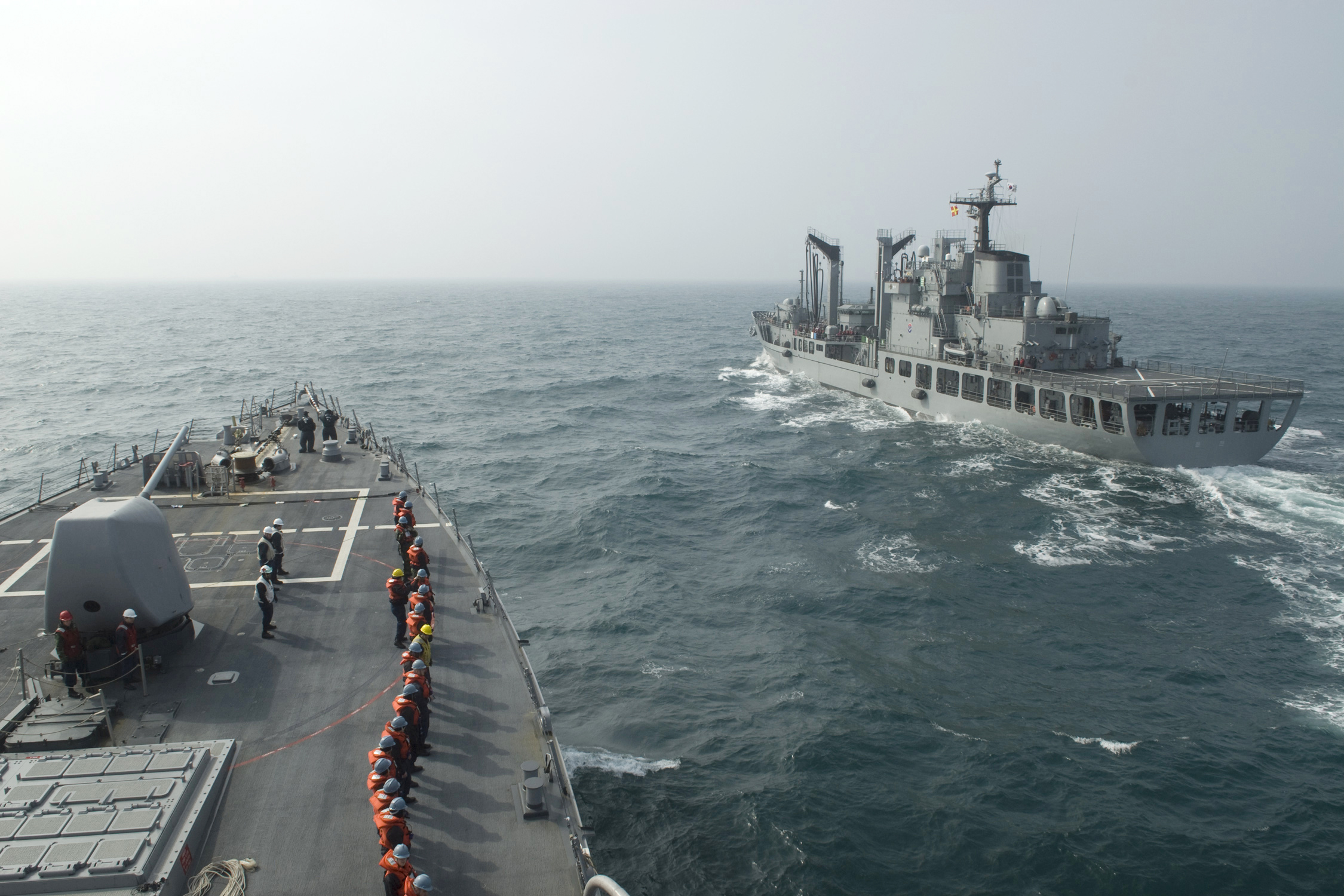
ROKS Hwacheon and USS John S. McCain on 18 March 2009

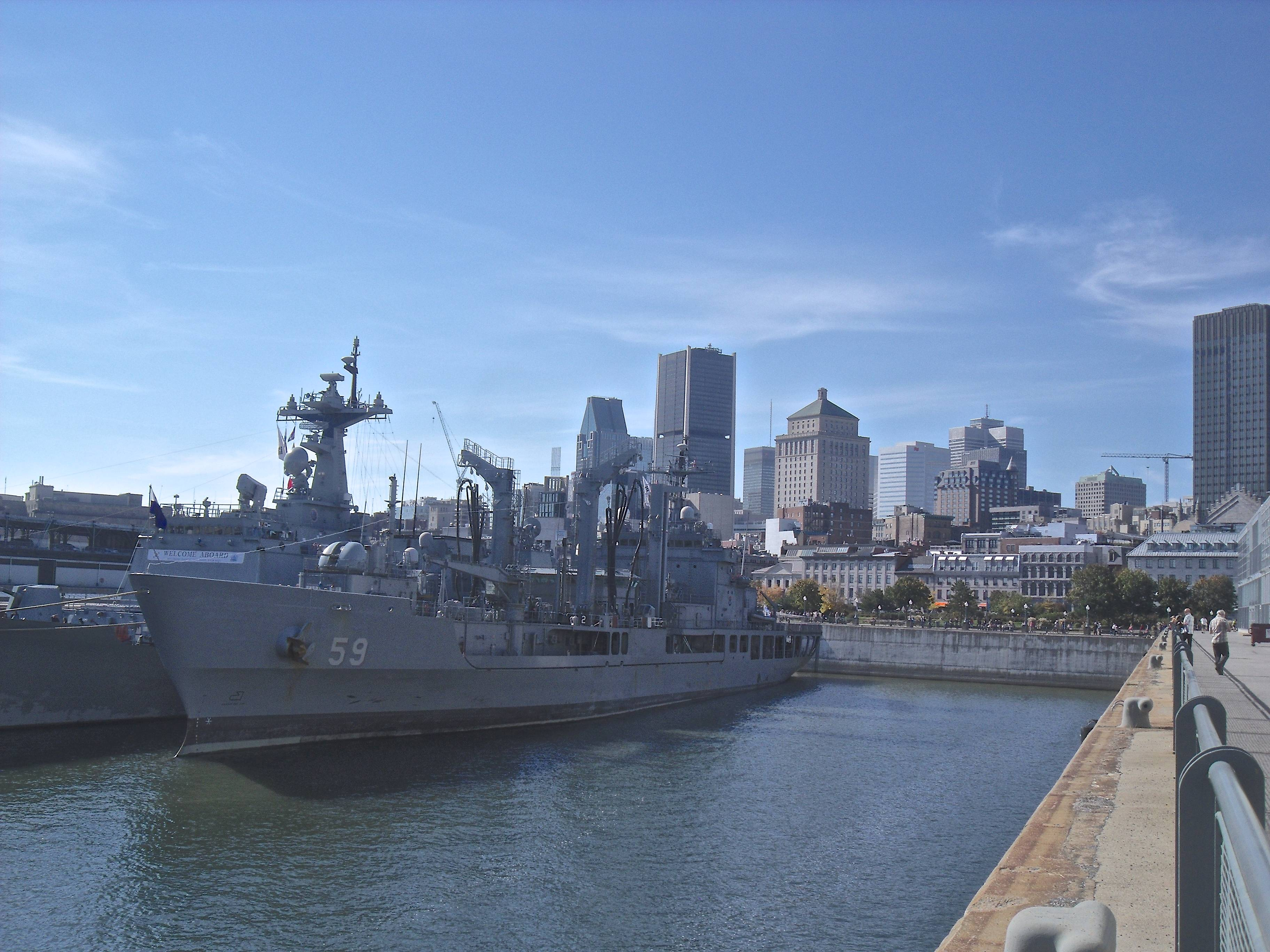
ROKS Hwacheon in Montreal on 14 October 2013

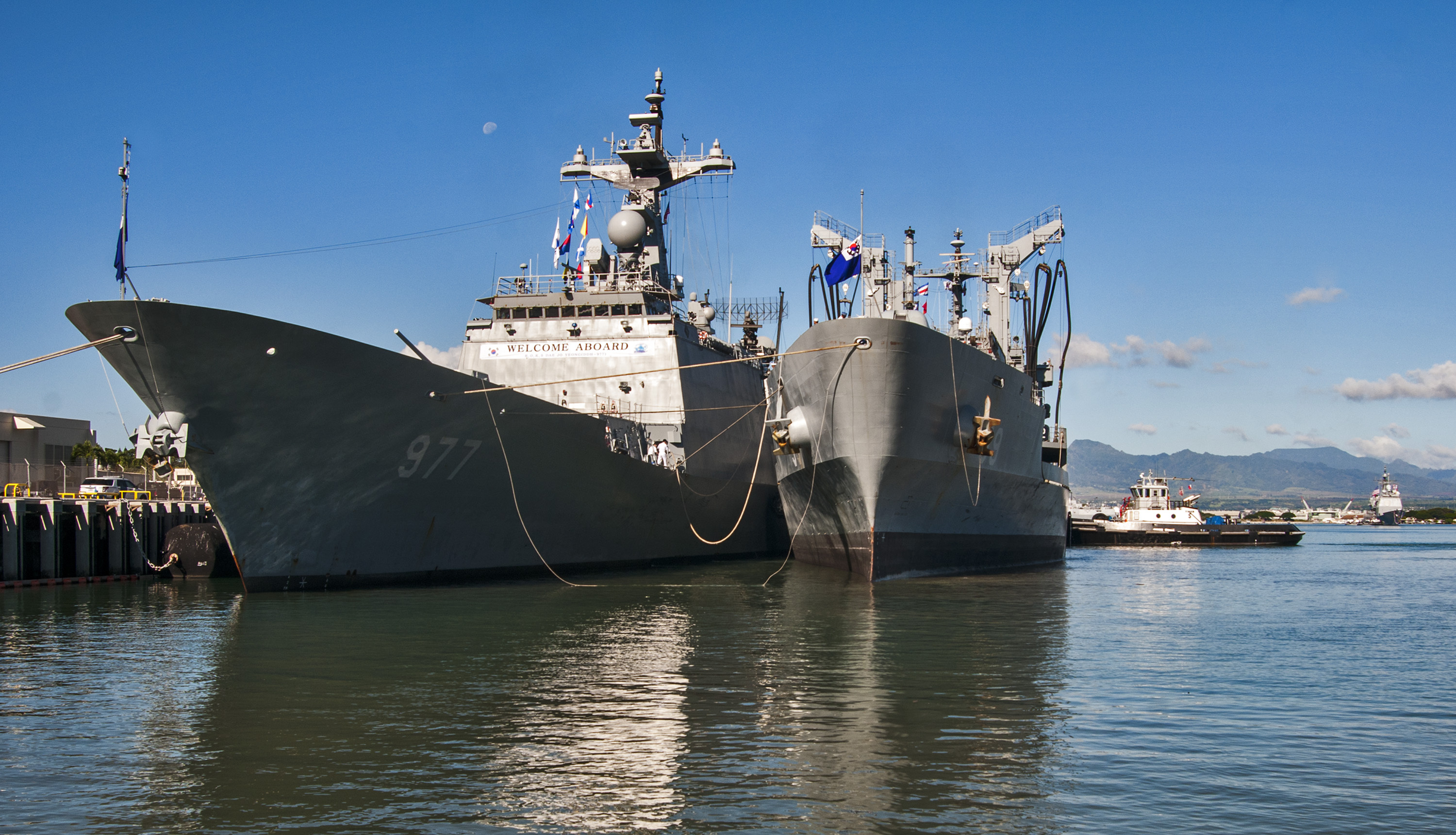
ROKS Hwacheon and ROKS Dae Jo-yeong at Pearl Harbor on 22 November 2013

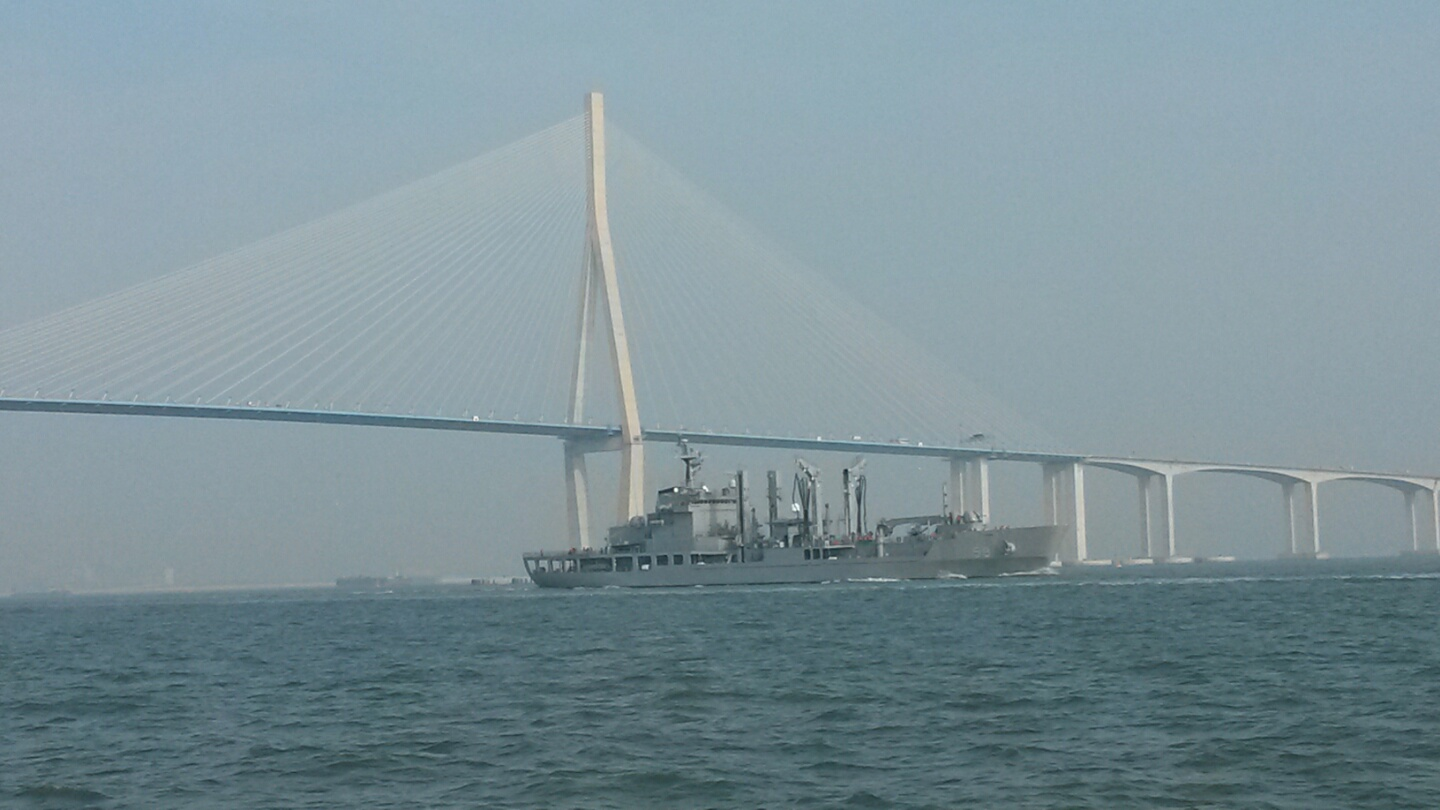
ROKS Hwacheon on 10 November 2015

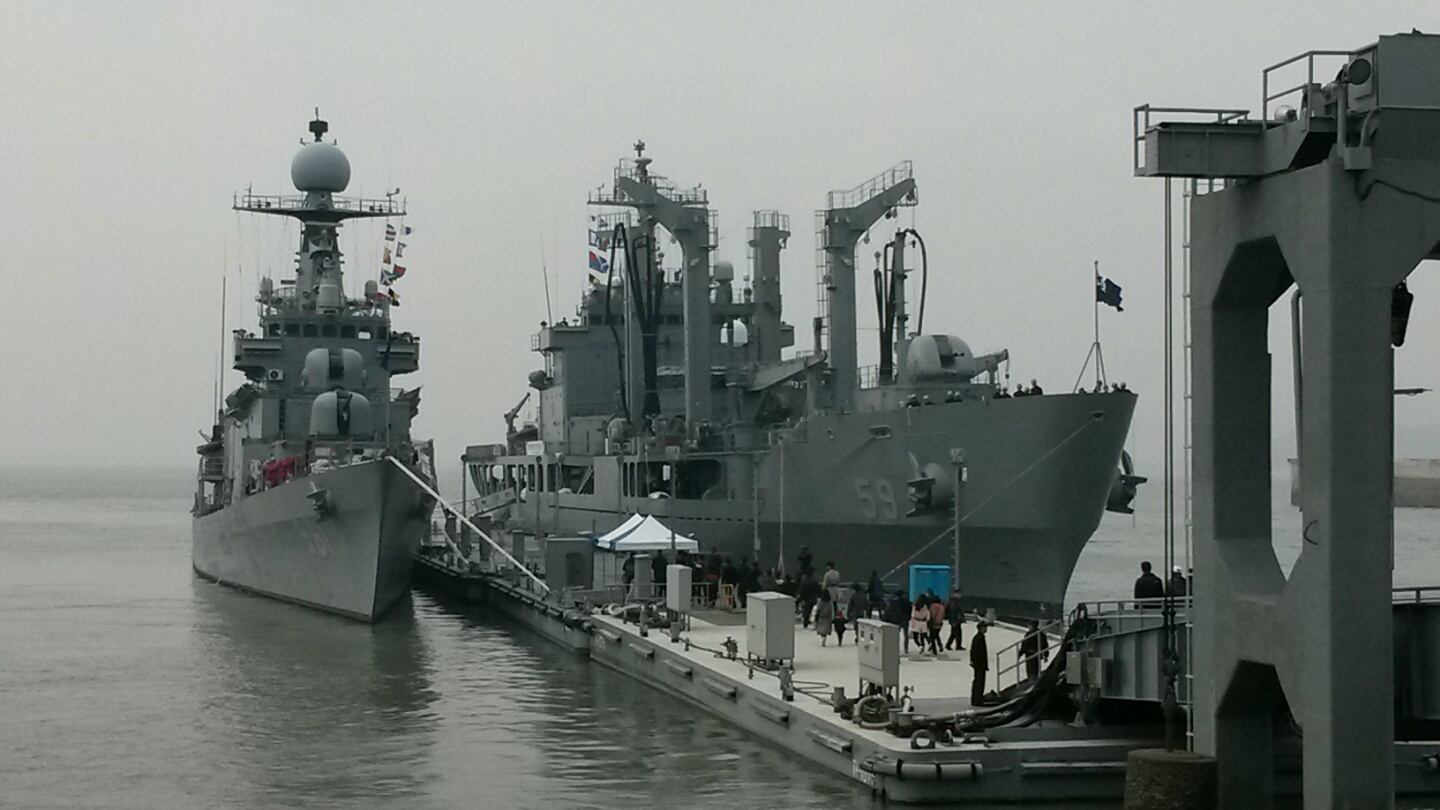
ROKS Hwacheon and ROKS Cheongju on 10 November 2015

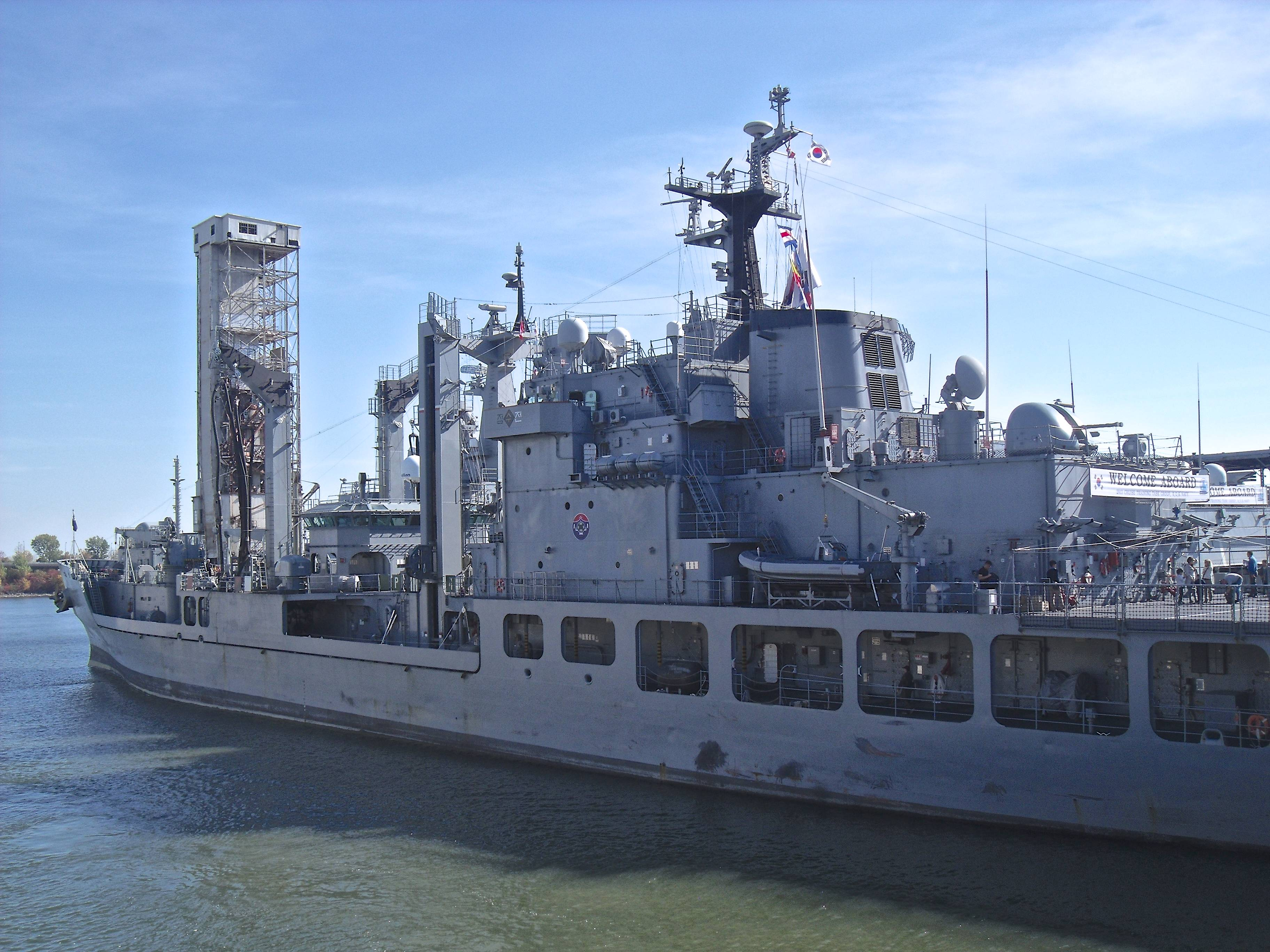
