= ROKS Cheonji =

Cheonji-class combat support ship

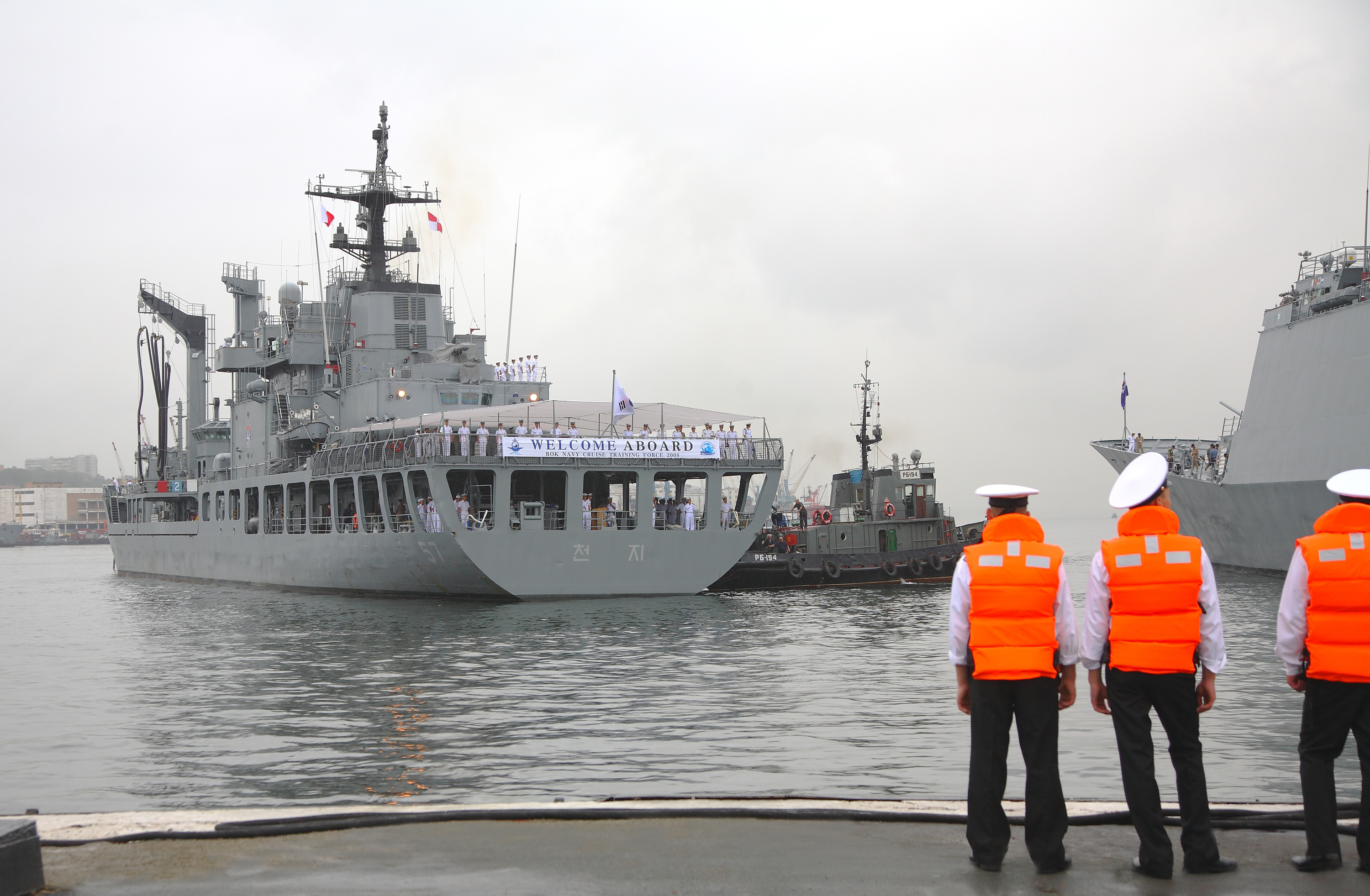
- ROKS Cheonji in Vladivostok on 27 August 2008

History

South Korea
- Name: Cheonji; (천지)
- Namesake: Cheonji
- Builder: Hyundai
- Laid down: 29 December 1988
- Launched: 26 July 1990
- Commissioned: 4 January 1991
- Identification: Callsign: HLQF; Pennant number: AOE-57
- Status: Active

General characteristics
- Class & type: Cheonji-class fast combat support ship
- Displacement: 4,200 tonnes (4,134 long tons) light; 9,113 tonnes (8,969 long tons) full load
- Length: 133.7 m (438 ft 8 in)
- Beam: 17.8 m (58 ft 5 in)
- Draft: 6.8 m (22 ft 4 in)
- Propulsion: 2 × Voith Schneider Propeller
- Speed: 20 knots (37 km/h; 23 mph)
- Range: 4,500 nmi (8,300 km)
- Sensors & processing systems: 2 × Anti-ship radar
- Armament: 1 × 20 mm cannon; 1 × 40 mm cannon; DAGAIE
- Aviation facilities: Helipad

ROKS Cheonji (AOE-57) is the lead ship of the Cheonji-class fast combat support ship (AOE) in the Republic of Korea Navy, and is named after the lake, Cheonji.

== Development ==
After the Korean War, the Korean Navy purchased and operated small refueling ships from the 1960s to the 1980s. These ships were obsolete due to prolonged operation, which forced their retirement beginning in the late 1970s. As the demand for maritime operations increased every day, the Navy required vessels to complete the missions.

In the mid-1980s, based on ship drying experiences, the Korean Navy proposed building combat support ships domestically. From 1988 to 1990, the first combat support ship, later named Cheonji, was built and launched. Daecheong and Hwacheon were built seven years later. At the time, the Korean Navy decided whether or not to build follow-up ships after finishing the operation test of the first ship.

As the need for support ships increased, the Navy designed the Soyang-class ships in 2016, based on the Cheonji class.

== Construction and career ==
ROKS Cheongju was launched on 29 December 1988 by Hyundai Heavy Industries and commissioned on 4 January 1991. She was the first logistic support ship built by the Navy and was the largest of the warships operated by the Navy at the time of commissioning.

In 1998, she was the flagship of the International Fleet Review of the Republic of Korea, and participated in the Japanese international naval ceremony in 2002 and the British naval warfare commemoration of the 200th anniversary of the Battle of Trafalgar in 2005.

== Gallery ==
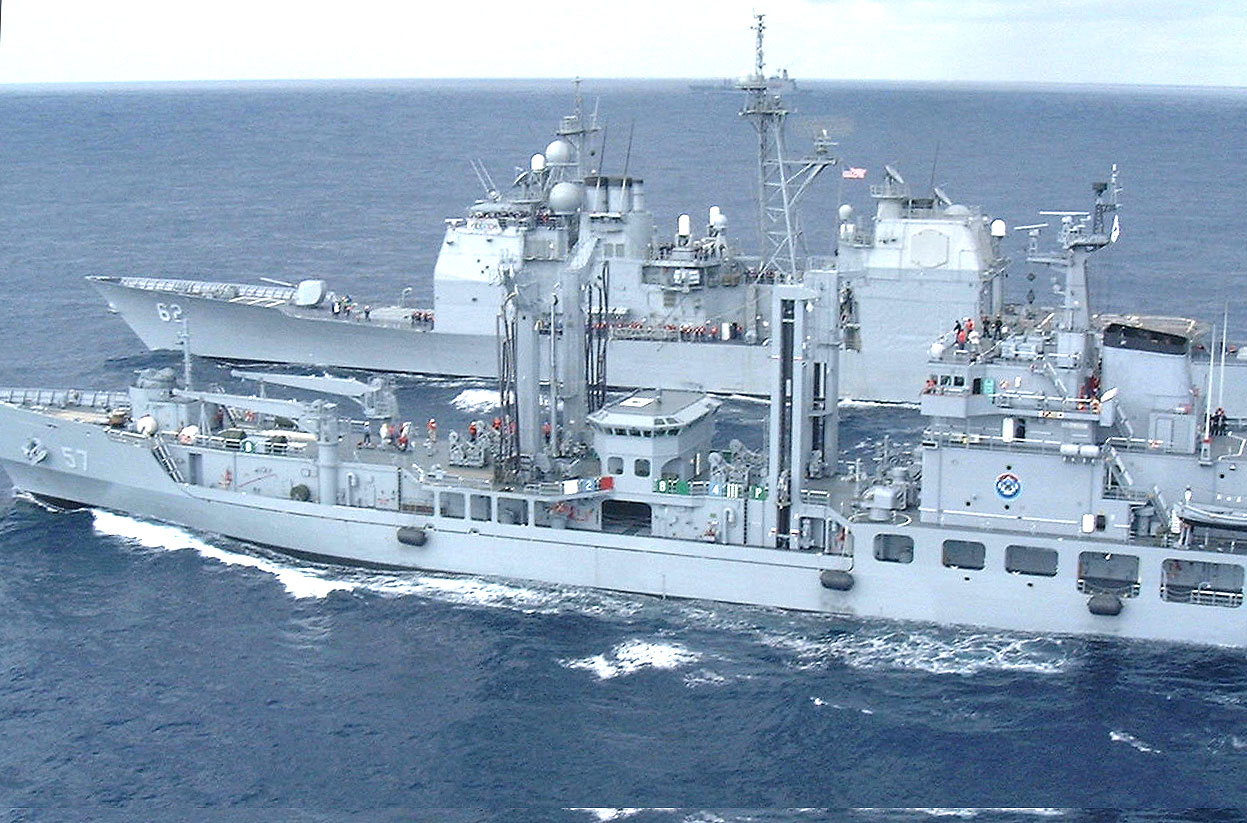
ROKS Cheonji and USS Chancellorsville on 6 February 2002

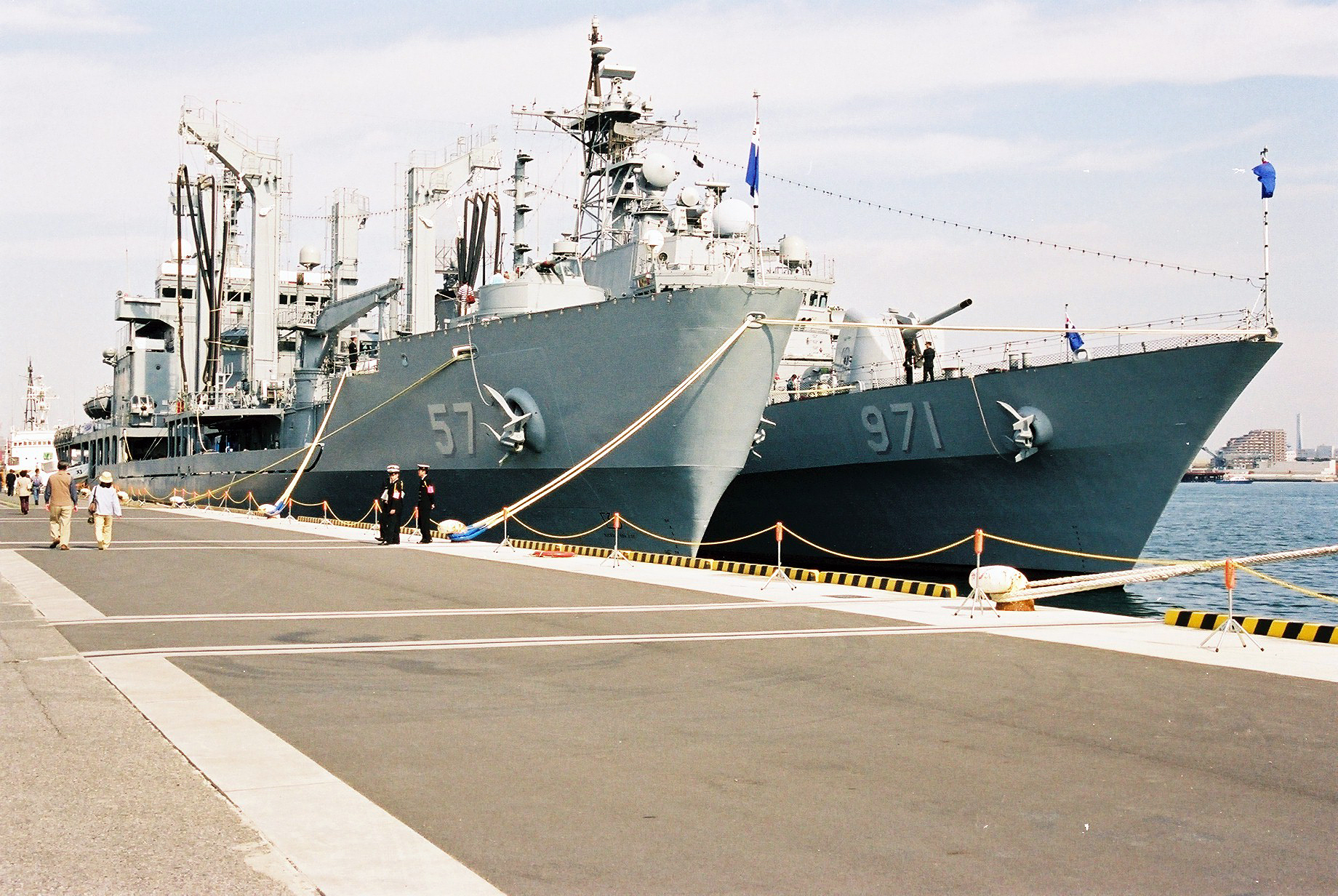
ROKS Cheonji and ROKS Gwanggaeto the Great on 10 October 2002

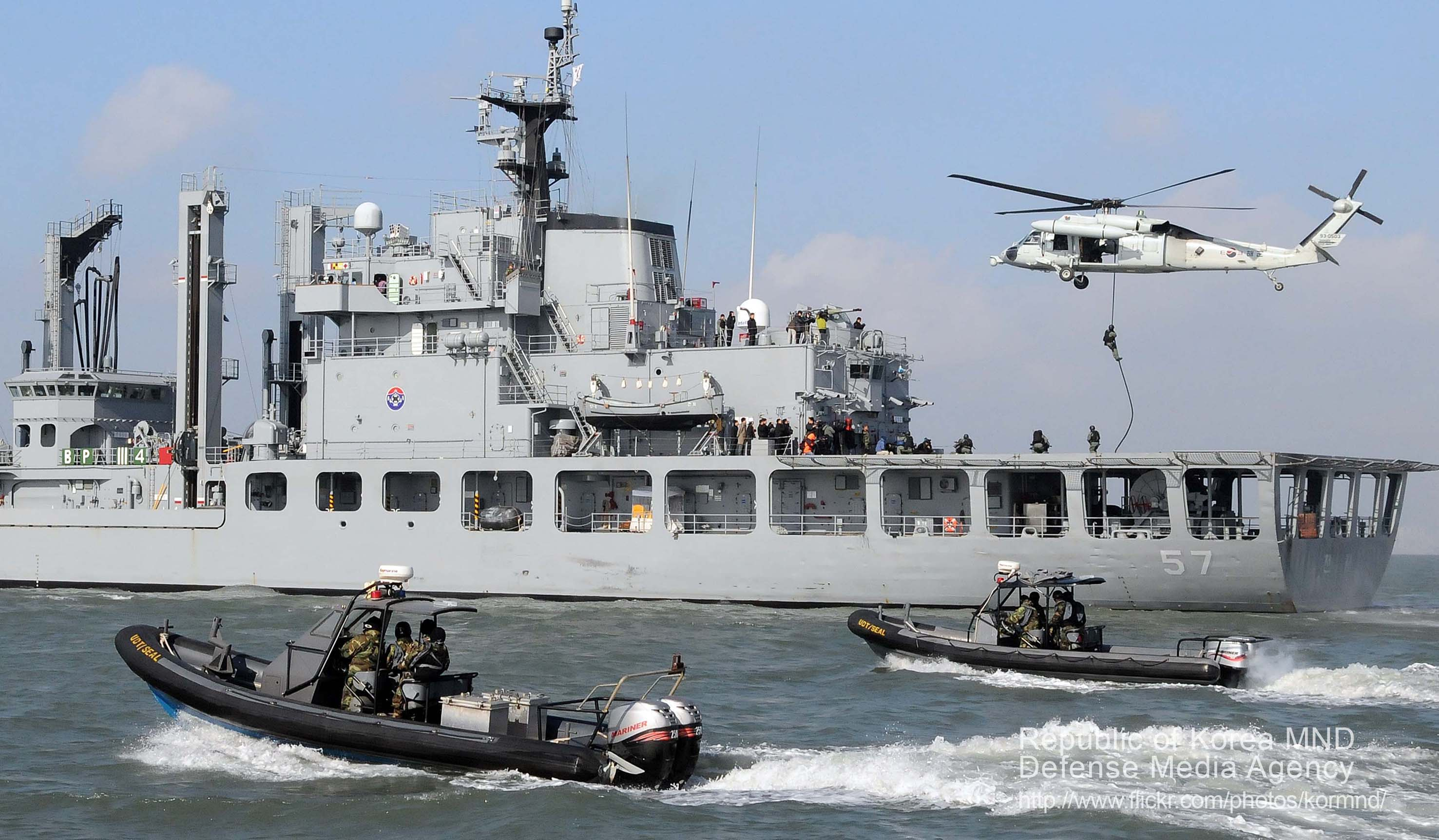
ROKS Cheonji on 22 January 2011

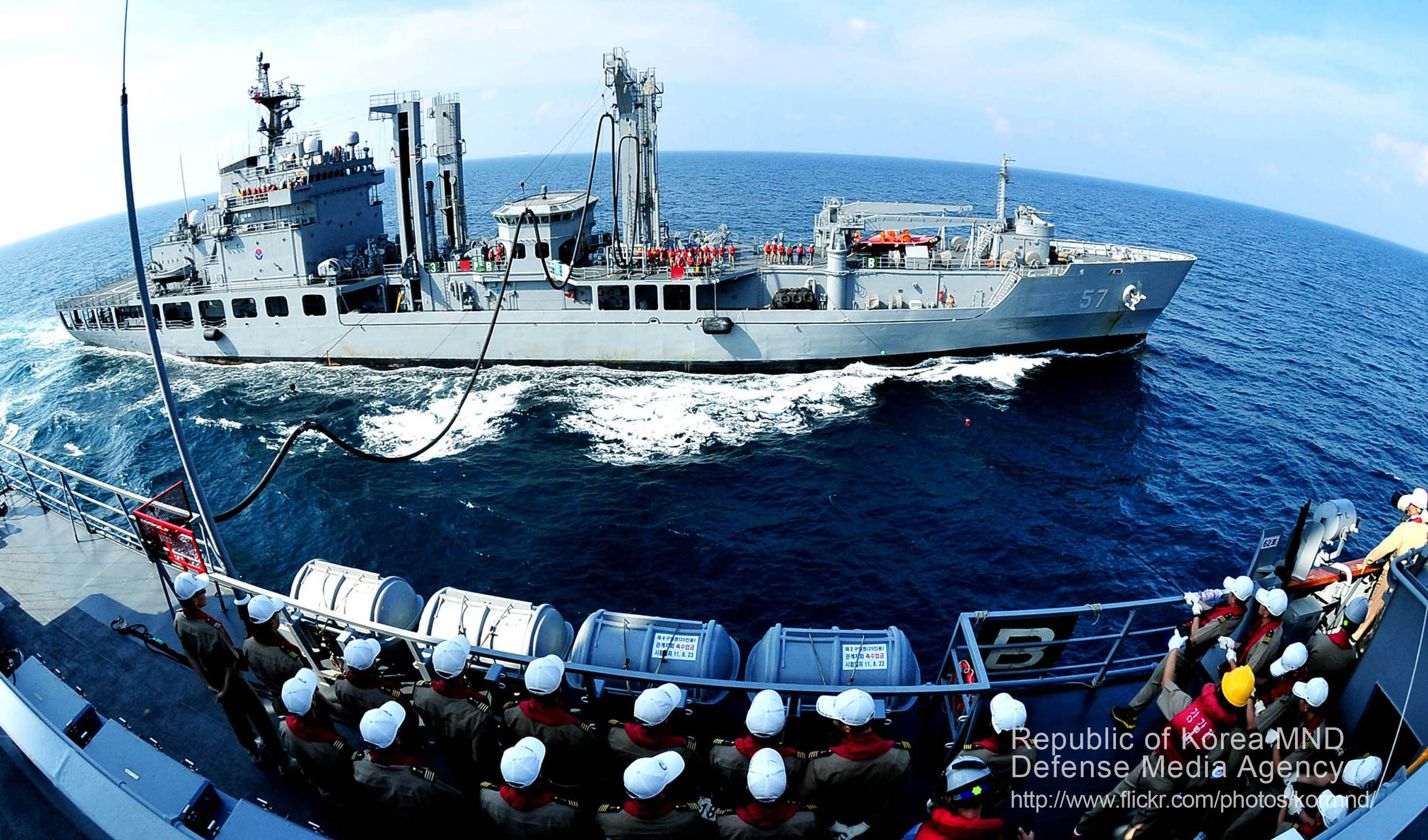
ROKS Cheonji on 22 November 2011

ROKS Cheonji and USS McCampbell on 17 March 2013
