= ROKS Daecheong =

Cheonji-class fast combat support ship

History

South Korea
- Name: Daecheong; (대청)
- Namesake: Daecheong
- Builder: Hyundai
- Launched: 1997
- Commissioned: November 1997
- Identification: Callsign: HLGH; Pennant number: AOE-58
- Status: Active

General characteristics
- Class & type: Cheonji-class fast combat support ship
- Displacement: 4,200 tonnes (4,134 long tons) light; 9,113 tonnes (8,969 long tons) full load
- Length: 133.7 m (438 ft 8 in)
- Beam: 17.8 m (58 ft 5 in)
- Draft: 6.8 m (22 ft 4 in)
- Propulsion: 2 × Voith Schneider Propeller
- Speed: 20 knots (37 km/h; 23 mph)
- Range: 4,500 nmi (8,300 km)
- Sensors & processing systems: 2 × Anti-ship radar
- Armament: 1 × 20 mm cannon; 1 × 40 mm cannon; DAGAIE
- Aviation facilities: Helipad

ROKS Daecheong (AOE-58) is the second ship of the Cheonji-class fast combat support ship (AOE) in the Republic of Korea Navy. She is named after the lake, Daecheong.

== Development ==
After the Korean War, the Korean Navy purchased and operated small refueling ships from the 1960s to the 1980s. These ships were obsolete due to prolonged operation, which forced their retirement beginning in the late 1970s. As the demand for maritime operations increased daily, the Navy required vessels to complete the missions.

From the mid-1980s, based on ship drying experiences, the Korean Navy proposed building combat support ships domestically. From 1988 to 1990, the first combat support ship, later named Cheonji, was built and launched. Daecheong and Hwacheon were built seven years later. At the time, the Korean Navy decided whether or not to build follow-up ships after finishing the operation test of the first ship.

As the needs of support ships increased, the Navy designed the Soyang-class ships in 2016, based on the Cheonji class.

== Construction and career ==
ROKS Daecheong was launched in 1997 by Hyundai Heavy Industries and commissioned in November 1997. She was the second logistic support ship built by the Navy.

On 3 November 2015, she made a goodwill visit to Portsmouth.
