= Soyang-class fast combat support ship =

Ship class

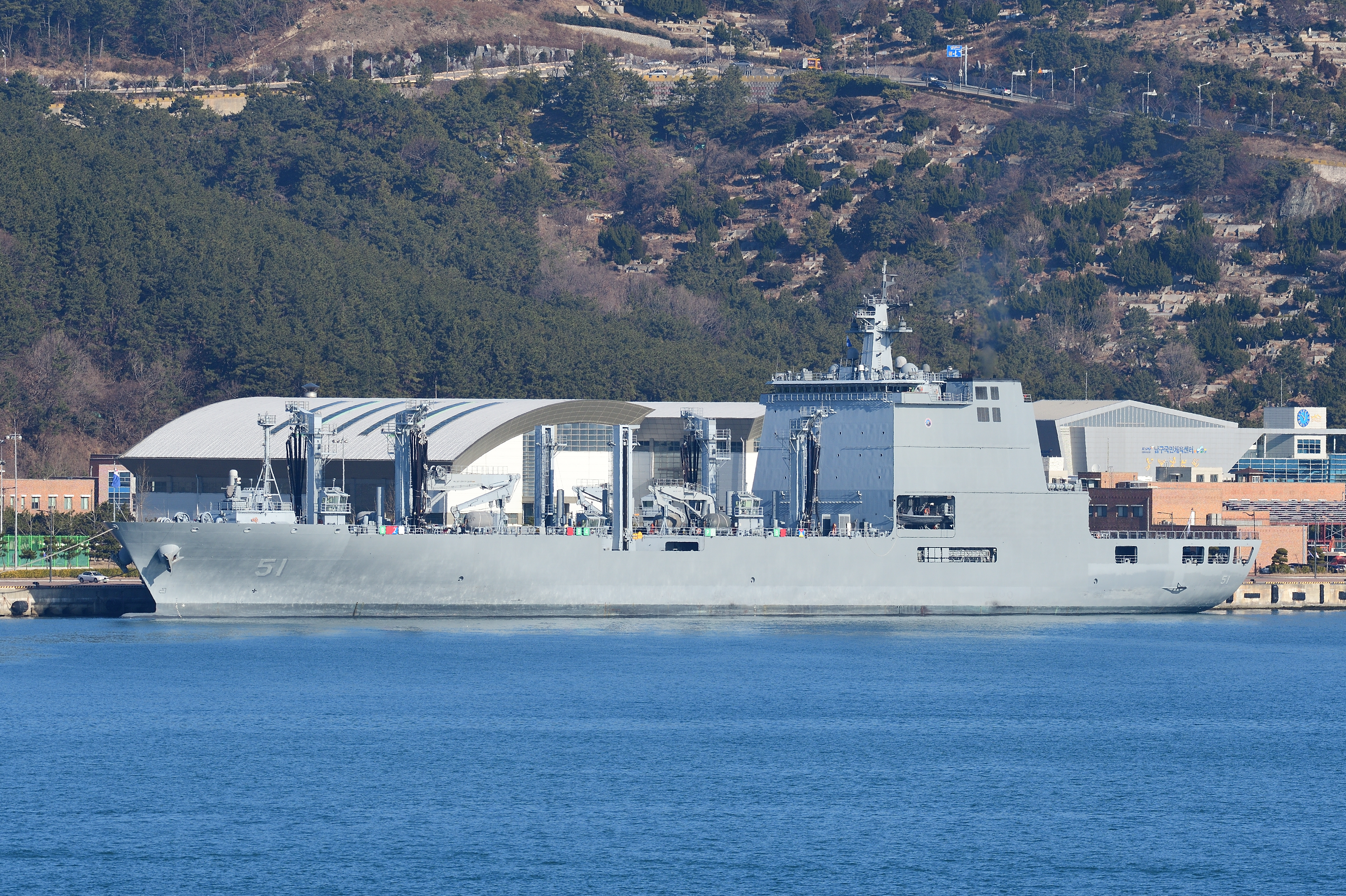
- ROKS Soyang at Busan Naval Base on 21 January 2020

Class overview
- Builders: Hyundai Heavy Industries; Hanwha Ocean
- Operators: Republic of Korea Navy
- Preceded by: Cheonji-class fast combat support ship
- Cost: US$331 million for the second ship
- Built: 2016-present
- In service: 2018-present
- Planned: 2
- Completed: 1
- Active: 1

General characteristics
- Type: Fast combat support ship
- Displacement: 10,105 tonnes (9,945 long tons) light load 22,500 tonnes (22,145 long tons) full load
- Length: 190 m (623 ft 4 in)
- Beam: 25 m (82 ft 0 in)
- Draft: 8 m (26 ft 3 in)
- Propulsion: Combined diesel-electric or diesel (CODELOD)
- Speed: 15 knots (28 km/h; 17 mph) (cruise); 24 knots (44 km/h; 28 mph) (max)
- Range: 5,500 nmi (10,200 km; 6,300 mi)
- Complement: 140
- Electronic warfare & decoys: MASS decoy launchers
- Armament: 1× 20 mm Phalanx CIWS Mark 15 guns
- Aircraft carried: SH-60 Seahawk
- Aviation facilities: Helipad and hangar

The Soyang-class fast combat support ship (AOE-II) are fast combat support ships in service in the Republic of Korea Navy.

== Development and design ==
They have a length of 190 metres (623 ft 4 in) and a width of 25 metres (82 ft 0 in). The vessels are capable of embarking a helicopter on her helipad. She carriers a single Phalanx CIWS and MASS decoy launchers. They have a displacement of about 10,105 tonnes (9,945 long tons) and a crew of 140. She runs on both hybrid diesel and electric engines with two shafts. The ship has a maximum speed of 24 knots (44 km/h; 28 mph) and a range of 5,500 nautical miles (10,200 km; 6,300 mi).

== Construction ==
ROKS Soyang was laid down on 13 July 2015 and launched on 29 November 2016 by Hyundai Heavy Industries. Commissioning followed on 18 September 2018.

A second vessel was announced, to be built by Hanwha Ocean 26 July 2024. She is planned to be commissioned in December 2028.

== List of ships ==
Construction data
Hull number	Name	Builder	Launched	Commissioned	Status	Notes
AOE-57	Soyang	Hyundai Heavy Industries	29 November 2016	18 September 2018	In service	
AOE-?	TBA	Hanwha Ocean	-	December 2028 (planned)	Announced	

== See also ==
- Den Helder class
- Vulcano class
- Lewis and Clark class
