= USNS Rincon =

Rincon-class gasoline tanker

History

United States
- Name: USNS Rincon (T-AOG-77)
- Builder: Todd-Houston Shipbuilding Corporation; Houston, Texas
- Yard number: 213
- Laid down: 24 February 1945 as Tarland
- Launched: 5 June 1945 as Rincon
- Sponsored by: Mrs. J. L. Baker
- Completed: 5 October 1945
- Acquired: 1 July 1950
- In service: 1 July 1950
- Fate: leased to South Korea, 21 February 1982

History

South Korea
- Name: ROKS Soyang (AOG-55)
- Acquired: 21 February 1982
- Fate: Returned to the U.S. late 1990s

General characteristics (as USNS Rincon)
- Class & type: Rincon-class gasoline tanker
- Displacement: 6,047 long tons (6,144 t) (light)
- Length: 325 ft (99 m)
- Beam: 48 ft (15 m)
- Draft: 19 ft (5.8 m)
- Propulsion: 1 × diesel engine
- Speed: 10 knots (19 km/h)
- Complement: 38

USNS Rincon (T-AOG-77) was a T1 tanker type, Rincon-class gasoline tanker, in operation for the United States Navy from 1950 through the 1970s. She was originally constructed as MS Tarland for the United States Maritime Commission at the end of World War II, and intended for delivery to the United Kingdom under the terms of Lend-Lease. Completed in October 1945, she was delivered to the Army Transport Service of the United States Army under the name USAT Rincon. Transferred to the U.S. Navy in 1950, she transported gasoline during the Korean War, earning two battle stars in the process. After service extending into the 1970s, the ship was transferred to South Korea in February 1982. As ROKS So Yang (AOG-55), she served the South Korean Navy until the late 1990s, when she was returned to the United States. She was struck from the U.S. Naval Vessel Register on 23 October 1998.

== Career ==
Rincon (T-AOG-77)—originally slated for use by the British under the terms of the Lend-Lease Program— was laid down under a United States Maritime Commission contract (MC hull 2640) as Tarland on 24 February 1945 by the Todd-Houston Shipbuilding Corporation of Houston, Texas. She was sponsored by Mrs. J. L. Baker and launched as Rincon on 5 June 1945. She was completed on 5 October 1945 and delivered to the Maritime Commission.

After a brief period of operation, she was entered into the National Defense Reserve Fleet in April 1946, but was transferred to the Army Transport Service of the United States Army. As USAT Rincon, she served the U.S. Army until the Army Transport Service was absorbed into the United States Navy's Military Sea Transportation Service. She was handed over to the U.S. Navy at Yokohama on 1 July 1950 and designated T-AOG-77, a United States Naval Ship, and assigned to MSTS, Far East

Rincon immediately commenced shuttling fuel to the Japanese ports whence troops and supplies were being sent to the fighting front in Korea. In September, the ship was assigned Sasebo–Pusan shuttle runs as facilities at the latter port were expanded to meet the needs of U.N. forces being lifted into the embattled peninsula. Throughout the three years of conflict, Rincon interrupted that duty only once for runs to Saigon and Haiphong in March 1951. Rincon earned two battle stars for her service during the Korean War.

After the s:Korean Armistice Agreement was signed in July 1953, she continued her Japanese–Korean shuttle service until February 1959. Then transferred to MSTS, Pacific, she carried fuel from Pearl Harbor to Midway and bases in the Marshalls until reassigned to MSTS, Far East, in May 1961. She then returned to Sasebo, whence into 1974 she carried gasoline and other fuels to American and Allied forces in the western Pacific, particularly those in Vietnam.

Leased to South Korea on 21 February 1982, the gasoline tanker served as ROKS So Yang (AOG-55) until returned to U.S. custody in the late 1990s as the Cheonji class came into service. The tanker was struck from the Naval Vessel Register on 23 October 1998.
