= Cheonji-class fast combat support ship =

Ship class

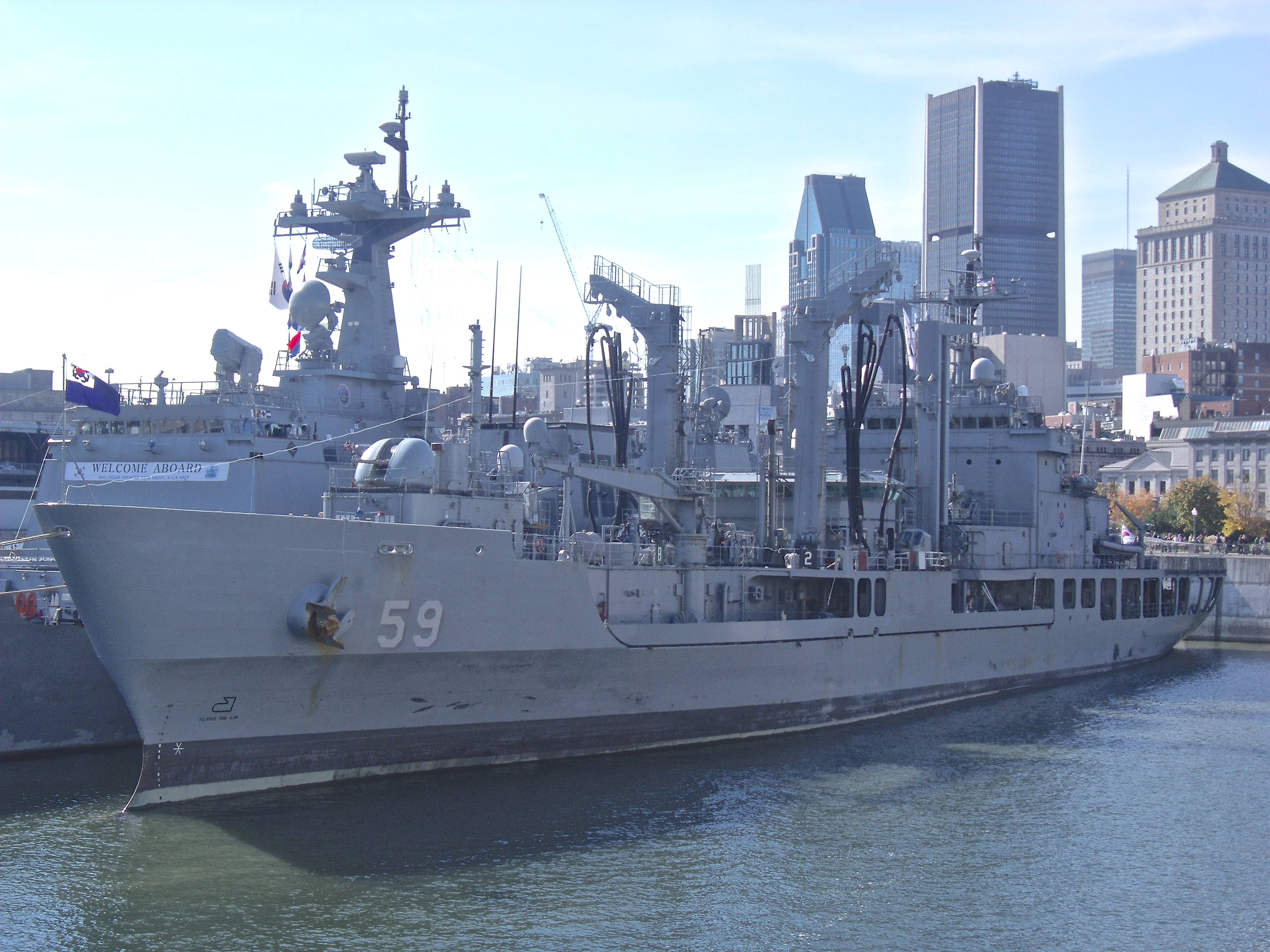
- ROKS Hwacheon in Montreal on 15 October 2013

Class overview
- Builders: Hyundai Heavy Industries
- Operators: Republic of Korea Navy
- Preceded by: Soyang class (1982)
- Succeeded by: Soyang class (2016)
- Built: 1990–1998
- In commission: 1991–present
- Completed: 3
- Active: 3

General characteristics
- Type: Fast combat support ship
- Displacement: 4,200 tonnes (4,134 long tons); 9,113 tonnes (8,969 long tons) (full load)
- Length: 133.7 m (438 ft 8 in)
- Beam: 17.8 m (58 ft 5 in)
- Draft: 6.8 m (22 ft 4 in)
- Propulsion: 2 × Voith Schneider Propeller
- Speed: 20 knots (37 km/h; 23 mph)
- Range: 4,500 nmi (8,300 km)
- Sensors & processing systems: 2 × Anti-ship radar
- Armament: 1 × 20 mm cannon; 1 × 40 mm cannon; DAGAIE

The Cheonji-class fast combat support ship (천지급 군수지원함, 天池級軍需支援艦) are fast combat support ships in service in the Republic of Korea Navy. After commissioning in the 1990s, they significantly increased the Korean Navy's ocean operation ability, especially in foreign domains. They participated in events using their wide deck and contributed to the development of civil-military relations.

== Background and construction ==
After the Korean War, the Korean Navy purchased and operated small refueling ships from the 1960s to the 1980s. These ships were obsolete due to prolonged operation, which forced their retirement beginning in the late 1970s. As the demand for maritime operations increased day, the Navy required vessels to complete the missions.

From the mid-1980s, based on ship drying experiences, the Korean Navy proposed building combat support ships domestically. From 1988 to 1990, the first combat support ship, later named Cheonji, was built and launched. Daecheong and Hwacheon were built seven years later. At the time, the Korean Navy decided whether or not to build follow-up ships after finishing the operation test of the first ship.

As the needs of support ships increased, the Navy designed the Soyang-class ships in 2016, based on the Cheonji class.

== Design ==
Cheonji-class ships are about 133 metres (436 ft 4 in) long, 18 metres (59 ft 1 in) wide. It was the largest of the Korean Navy before the construction of Dokdo class. They can load about 4,800 tons of cargo, excluding the ship's supply.

They are armed with one 20 millimetres (0.79 in) gun, one 40 millimetres (1.6 in) gun, and Device Automatic Gurre Anti-missile Infrared Electromagnetic device, providing self-defence against enemy ships.

Resupply systems are located both left and right, to supply two ships at once. At the stern, it is possible to resupply both Cheonji class and other ships by using UH-60 Black Hawk helicopters. The most distinctive feature is that it is highly adaptable and can transport supplies to ports without cargo handling facilities.

== List of ships ==
The names of fast combat support ships are taken from lakes that have large water volume in Korea. For example, Cheonji, the first ship of the class, is the name of Cheonji lake.

Construction data
Hull number	Name	Launched	Commissioned	Status
AOE 57	ROKS Cheonji	1990	1991	In service
AOE 58	ROKS Daecheong	1997	1997	In service
AOE 59	ROKS Hwacheon	1997	1998	In service
