= ROKS Soyang (AOE-51) =

South Korean Navy fast combat support ship

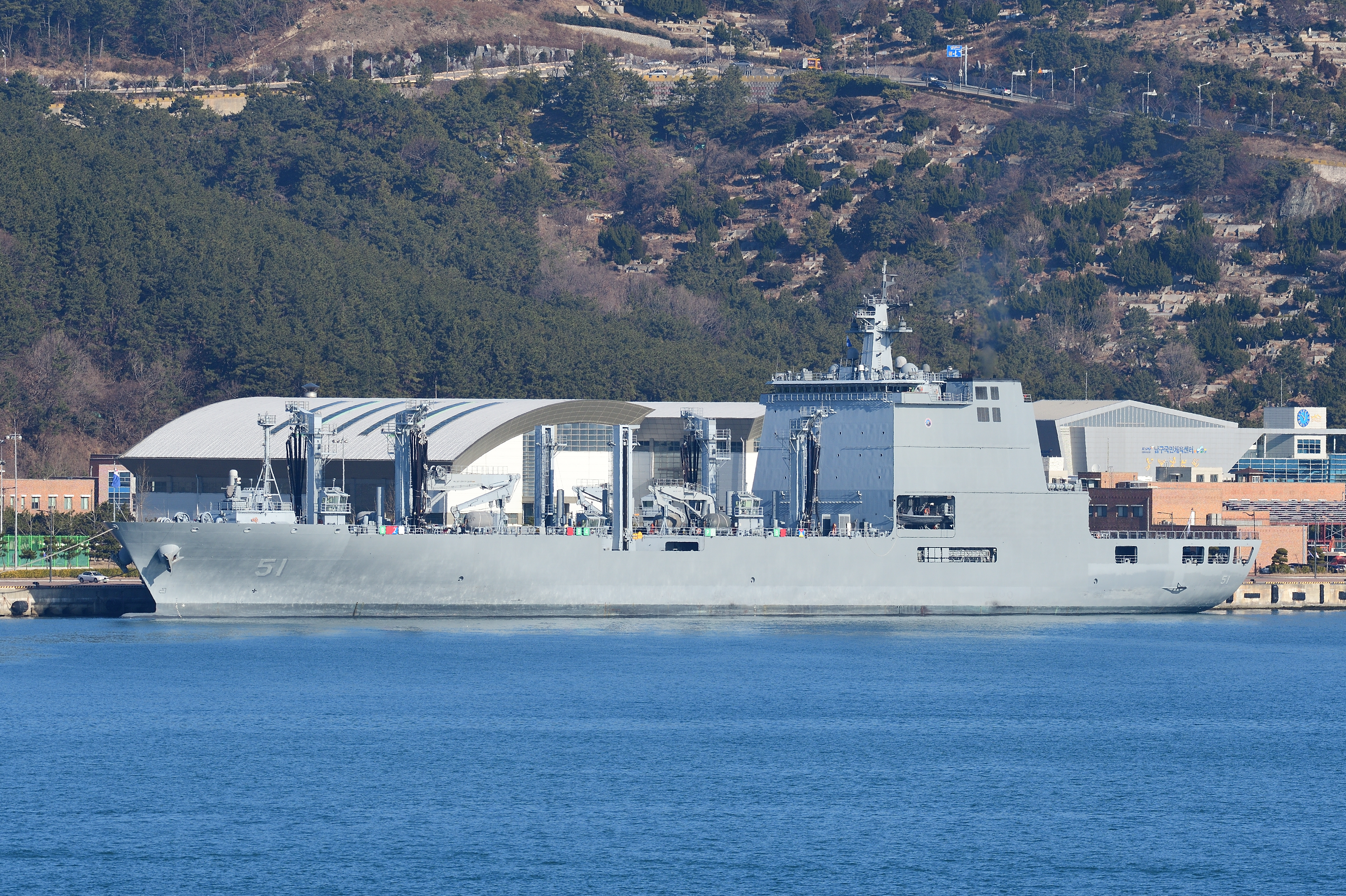
- ROKS Soyang at Busan Naval Base on 21 January 2020

History

South Korea
- Name: Soyang; (소양)
- Namesake: Soyang, South Korea
- Builder: Hyundai of Ulsan, South Korea
- Laid down: 13 July 2015
- Launched: 29 November 2016
- Acquired: 7 September 2018
- Commissioned: 18 September 2018
- Home port: Busan, South Korea
- Identification: AOE-51 (pennant number)
- Status: Active

Class overview
- Preceded by: Cheonji class
- Succeeded by: N/A

General characteristics
- Type: Fast combat support ship
- Displacement: 10,105 tonnes (9,945 long tons) full load
- Length: 190.0 m (623 ft 4 in)
- Beam: 25.0 m (82 ft 0 in)
- Propulsion: Diesel engine; Electric motor; 2 x shafts
- Speed: 24 knots (44 km/h; 28 mph)
- Range: 5,500 nmi (10,200 km; 6,300 mi)
- Complement: 140
- Electronic warfare & decoys: MASS decoy launchers
- Armament: 1 × 20 mm Phalanx CIWS Mark 15 guns
- Aviation facilities: Helipad

ROKS Soyang (AOE-51) is a fast combat support ship of the Republic of Korea Navy; she is named after the Soyang River.

== Development and design ==
On 7 September 2018, the Defense Acquisition Program Administration announced that Hyundai Heavy Industries had delivered Soyang to the Republic of Korea Navy.

She has a length of 190 metres (623 ft 4 in) and a width of 25 metres (82 ft 0 in). The vessel is capable of embarking a helicopter on her helipad. She carriers a single Phalanx CIWS and MASS decoy launchers. The vessel's displacement is about 10,105 tonnes (9,945 long tons) and has a crew of 140. She runs on both hybrid diesel and electric engines with two shafts. The ship has a maximum speed of 24 knots (44 km/h; 28 mph) and a range of 5,500 nautical miles (10,200 km; 6,300 mi).

== Construction and career ==
ROKS Soyang was laid down on 13 July 2015 and launched on 29 November 2016 by Hyundai Heavy Industries and commissioned on 18 September 2018.

On 17 November 2020, ROKS Soyang transferred medical supplies to BRP Conrado Yap offshore Manila, Philippines. Soyang sent three speed boats, masks and sanitizers for prevention of COVID-19 to the Philippines Navy ship during the exchange.
