= Operation Nordseetour =

1940 German naval raid

- Part of the Battle of the Atlantic, World War II
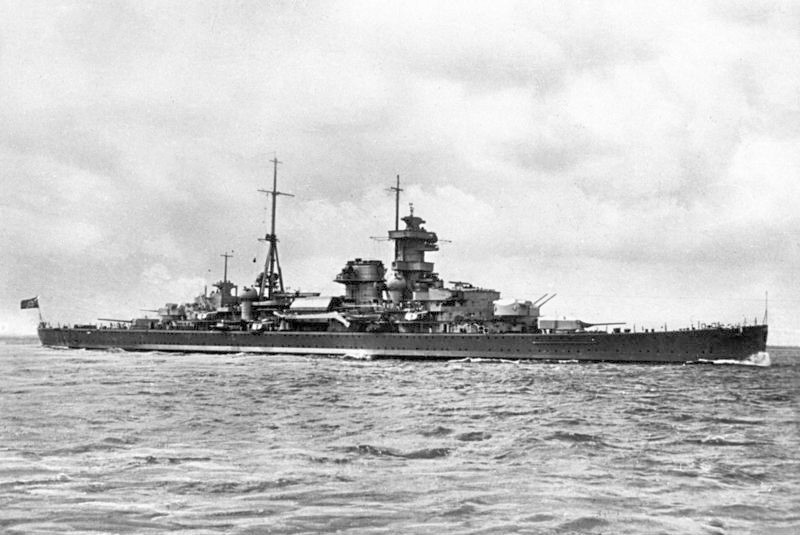
- Admiral Hipper in 1939
Date	30 November – 27 December 1940
Location	Atlantic Ocean

Belligerents
Germany	United Kingdom

Commanders and leaders
(Nazi Germany) Wilhelm Meisel	

Strength
1 heavy cruiser	1 heavy cruiser 2 light cruisers

Casualties and losses
None	1 heavy cruiser damaged 1 merchant ship sunk 2 transport ships damaged

Operation Nordseetour (German: North Sea Tour) was a raid conducted between 30 November and 27 December 1940 by the German heavy cruiser Admiral Hipper. It was part of the Battle of the Atlantic of World War II, with the ship seeking to attack Allied convoys in the North Atlantic. Admiral Hipper left Germany on 30 November 1940 and entered the Atlantic after evading British patrols. She had difficulty locating any convoys and was plagued by engine problems and bad weather. While returning to Brest in German-occupied France, Admiral Hipper encountered Convoy WS 5A on the night of 24 December. A torpedo attack that night did not inflict any damage and Admiral Hipper was driven off by the convoy's escorts when she attacked on the next morning. Two British transports and a heavy cruiser were damaged. The German cruiser sank a merchant ship later on 25 December, and arrived in Brest on 27 December.

The German navy was disappointed with the results of the raid. It indicated that the Admiral Hipper-class of heavy cruisers were not well suited to attacking shipping in the Atlantic, due to their short range and unreliable engines. The Royal Navy strengthened convoy escort forces in response to the attack on Convoy WS 5A. This frustrated two attacks that were attempted by German battleships in early 1941.

== Background ==
Plans prepared by the Kriegsmarine (German Navy) prior to World War II specified that its surface warships would be used to attack Allied merchant shipping travelling on the oceans. Submarines and aircraft were to be used against shipping near the coasts of Allied countries. Surface raiders were to range widely, make surprise attacks and then move to other areas. They were to be supported by supply ships that were pre-positioned before the start of operations. The Royal Navy anticipated Germany's intentions, and adopted plans of its own to institute convoys to protect merchant shipping and deploy cruisers to monitor attempts by German surface ships to break out into the Atlantic Ocean.

The Admiral Hipper-class of heavy cruisers were designed to operate in the North Atlantic. Their main armament was eight 203-millimetre (8.0 in) guns. The secondary armament comprised twelve 105-millimetre (4.1 in) guns, twelve 37-millimetre (1.5 in) guns and eight 20-millimetre (0.79 in) guns. The cruisers were also armed with twelve 533-millimetre (21.0 in) torpedo tubes. Their range was relatively short at 6,500 miles (10,500 km), which meant that they would need to frequently refuel from supply ships during sorties into the Atlantic. The engines also proved unreliable.

Admiral Hipper was the lead ship of the class and entered service in April 1939. During the following February she made a sortie into the North Sea with the battleships Scharnhorst and Gneisenau. From April that year she was involved in the German invasion of Norway, Operation Weserübung. On 8 April Admiral Hipper defeated the British destroyer HMS Glowworm off Norway, which rammed her before sinking. After landing troops at Trondheim, the cruiser returned to Germany for repairs on 12 April. She reentered service in May, and in early June accompanied the two Scharnhorst-class battleships and four destroyers for the Operation Juno attack on British shipping off Norway. On 8 June Admiral Hipper sank the British naval trawler HMT Juniper and critically damaged the troop transport Orama. The cruiser, Gneisenau and several destroyers undertook two abortive sorties from Trondheim on 10 and 20 June; on the second of these Gneisenau was torpedoed by a British submarine. From 25 July Admiral Hipper searched for Allied ships in the Norwegian and Barents Seas, and captured a Finnish freighter. She was ordered to return to Germany on 5 August, and reached Wilhelmshaven on 9 August. Admiral Hipper then underwent maintenance until 9 September. Captain Wilhelm Meisel assumed command during this period.

== Preparations ==
In August 1940 the German leader Adolf Hitler ordered an intensification of the attacks on Allied shipping in the Atlantic. At this time only Admiral Hipper and the heavy cruiser Admiral Scheer could be made ready to conduct anti-shipping raids. Gneisenau and Scharnhorst as well as the heavy cruiser Lützow were still undergoing repairs. The new battleship Bismarck and heavy cruiser Prinz Eugen were fitting out.

It was initially intended that Admiral Hipper would operate in the seas between Iceland and the Faroe Islands and possibly also the North Atlantic from late September in an attempt to divert the Home Fleet's ships during Operation Sea Lion, the planned German invasion of southern England. This sortie formed part of Operation Herbstreise (German: "Autumn Journey"), which also included decoy troop convoys that would feint a landing in Scotland. After the cancellation of the invasion Grand Admiral Erich Raeder, the commander of the Kriegsmarine, decided that Admiral Hipper's cruise should go ahead. The cruiser was to attack Allied shipping in the North Atlantic before sailing to Brest in occupied France.

During September the British received Ultra intelligence obtained by decrypting encoded Luftwaffe (German Air Force) radio messages that indicated Admiral Hipper was to make a reconnaissance sortie into the Barents Sea. This was the only Ultra intelligence they received on her operations during this period, as the codes protecting the Kriegsmarine's messages had not been broken.

== Raid ==
=== Initial attempt ===
Admiral Hipper departed Kiel bound for the Atlantic on 24 September 1940. She put in at Kristiansand in Norway to repair a broken cooling pump, and sailed again on 27 September. Admiral Hipper suffered an engine room fire the next day while sailing to the west of Stavanger. Both turbines had to be shut down to allow her crew to fight the fire, leaving the ship adrift for four hours. The damage from the fire forced the abandonment of the sortie.

The cruiser arrived back at Kiel on 30 September, and proceeded to Hamburg on 2 October for repairs. These were completed on 28 October. During this period Admiral Scheer departed Germany on 23 October 1940 for what proved to be a successful raid into the Atlantic and Indian Oceans that lasted until 1 April 1941.

=== Breakout into the Atlantic ===
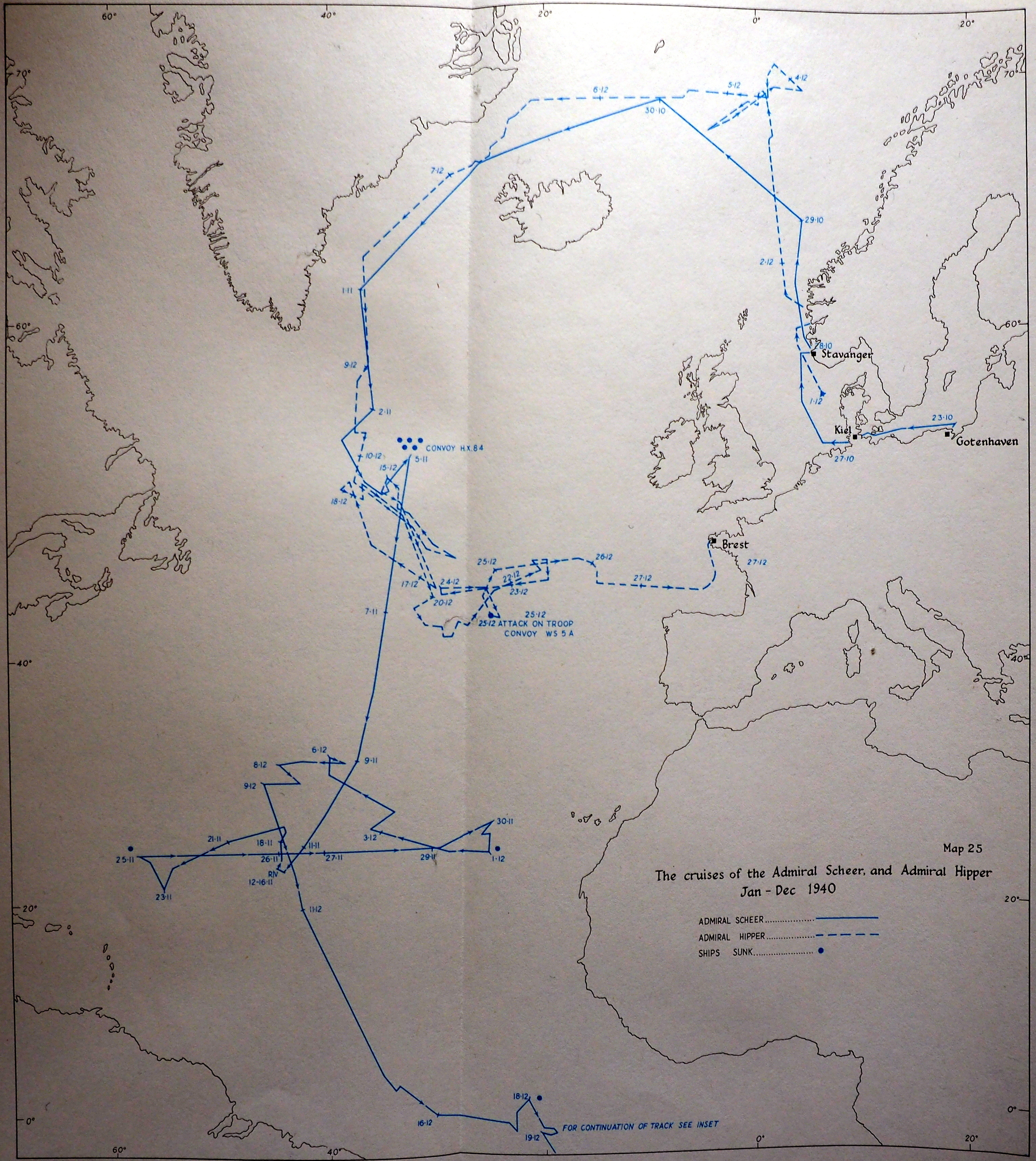
A map depicting the operations of the German warships Admiral Scheer and Admiral Hipper in the Atlantic between October 1940 and January 1941

Once the repairs were completed Admiral Hipper underwent training in the Baltic Sea from 29 October until 18 November. She then loaded ammunition and supplies for a long range operation into the Atlantic. This sortie, code named Operation Nordseetour (German: "North Sea Tour"), was more ambitious than that which had been planned for September. The goal of the operation was to attack Allied convoys in the North Atlantic. The cruiser was not to attack ships sailing independently. Due to Admiral Hipper's relatively short range and lack of durability, the plans for the operation called for the ship to make a relatively short cruise compared to that which was undertaken by Admiral Scheer. She was to enter the North Atlantic, sail south and then proceed east along the Allied convoy routes. At the conclusion of the operation Admiral Hipper was to dock in France. Consistent with standing practices for German surface raiders, Meisel was ordered to not engage enemy forces that were superior or equal to his ship.

At this time the German B-Dienst signals intelligence service was providing raiders with general information about the locations of Allied ships. The service was generally unable to pass on actionable intelligence though, as it could not decrypt intercepted Royal Navy radio messages. In particular, the Germans lacked information on the dates Allied convoys sailed and the routes they took. Each raider embarked a B-Dienst detachment that was responsible for monitoring Allied radio signals and using direction finding techniques to locate convoys and warships.

The cruiser set out again from Brunsbüttel on 30 November. She had been spotted there by a Royal Air Force reconnaissance aircraft the previous day, but the British did not realise that her presence at the port meant she was about to sail. Admiral Hipper was escorted by four torpedo boats for the first stage of the voyage. She refuelled from a tanker at a fjord near Bergen in Norway on 1 December before proceeding north. Meisel wanted a period of bad weather to help hide his ship from British patrols while passing Allied occupied Iceland, and he operated to the south of Jan Mayan island for the next several days. During this period, the cruiser refuelled from the tanker Adria on 2, 3 and 5 December. After the weather worsened, Admiral Hipper passed through the Denmark Strait that separated Greenland and Iceland on the night of 6/7 December. She was not detected by the British.

After entering the Atlantic, Admiral Hipper proceeded to the waters off southern Greenland to rendezvous with the tanker Friedrich Breme. It took several days to locate the tanker, during which Admiral Hipper's crew experienced extreme cold and a hurricane force storm.

=== Attack on Convoy WS 5A ===
Once refuelling was complete, Admiral Hipper began searching for convoys on the key route between Halifax in Canada and the United Kingdom. She patrolled to the south of the routes taken by convoys though, and did not encounter any. The crew endured another hurricane level storm, the cruiser's starboard engine failed and she ran dangerously low on fuel at one point. Admiral Hipper refuelled again from Friedrich Breme on 16 and 20 December. When Admiral Sheer attacked a British merchant ship off West Africa during 18 December, her captain did not attempt to jam the distress calls with the goal of encouraging the Royal Navy to focus on his ship rather than Admiral Hipper. On 20 December Meisel decided to conclude the operation, and set course for Brest.

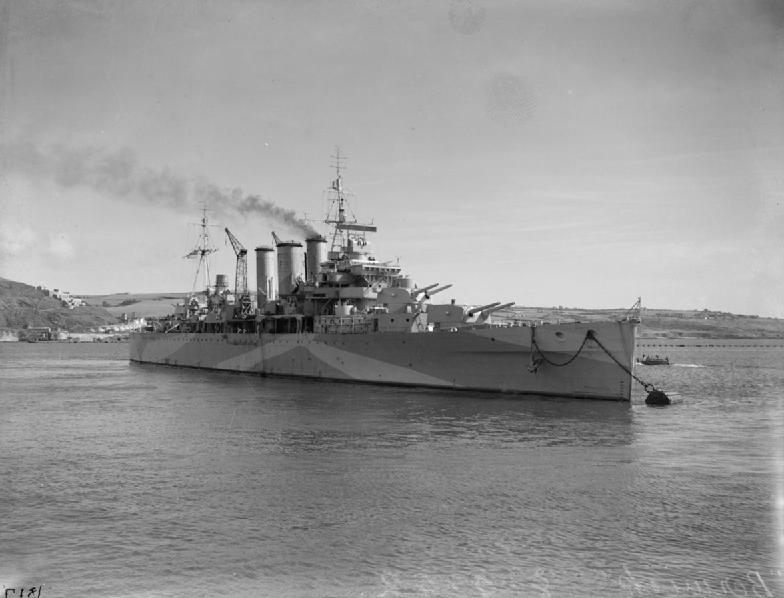
HMS Berwick in 1942

Admiral Hipper detected multiple ships with her radar at 8:45 pm on 24 December while sailing 700 miles (1,100 km) west of Cape Finisterre in Spain. This was Convoy WS 5A, which had sailed from the United Kingdom carrying 40,000 soldiers and large quantities of supplies on board 20 ships. The WS convoys were special convoys that carried troops and supplies from the United Kingdom to Egypt and Asia on board fast ships. They were assigned powerful escort forces. Five of the ships were travelling with the convoy in the North Atlantic before entering the Mediterranean Sea to form part of an Operation Excess convoy that would carry supplies to Malta and Greece.

Convoy WS 5A's escort comprised the heavy cruiser HMS Berwick as well as the light cruisers HMS Bonaventure and Dunedin. Only Dunedin was fitted with radar. The light cruiser HMS Naiad had also formed part of the escort until 24 December. The aircraft carriers HMS Argus and Furious were sailing with the convoy to transport land-based aircraft to West Africa. As their flight decks were crowded with these aircraft, the two carriers could only fly off five of their own aircraft.

Meisel believed that he had found one of the weakly escorted OB convoys that sailed from the United Kingdom to Africa and decided to attack it at dawn the next day. His radar was unable to distinguish escorts from cargo vessels. When in the darkness Admiral Hipper detected a large ship at the rear of the convoy, the Germans thought it was an escorting armed merchant cruiser. Preferring to weaken the escort before attacking the convoy in the morning, Meisel decided to attack with torpedoes which would not give away his presence as the British would believe they were under U-Boat attack. Admiral Hipper fired three torpedoes at the convoy at 1:53 am on 25 December, but none hit.

The German sailors spotted the convoy to the west at 6:03 am on Christmas Day. Weather conditions were poor, with a strong wind, heavy seas, limited visibility and rain squalls. Berwick was among the first ships to be sighted, and other escorts were soon spotted. Meisel turned his ship towards the British heavy cruiser. The attack plan was to approach unsuspected as close as possible, to be able to attack the ship with a three torpedo fan shot from the rear torpedo launcher. But fire was opened on her with his 203-millimetre guns from a range of 6,000 yards (5,500 m) at 6:39 am, before the torpedoes were launched. As a result, the torpedo launcher was blocked by the blast of the guns and the launch had to aborted. Similarly the launching of 3 torpedoes from the forward launcher was botched when the secondary armament opened fire on the other escorts. While the British had not spotted Admiral Hipper, Berwick's crew were at dawn action stations when the engagement began. They returned fire at Admiral Hipper from 6:41 am, and the light cruisers changed course to join the fight. During this period Admiral Hipper's secondary armament fired at the transports, damaging Empire Trooper and Arabistan. Two men were killed on Empire Trooper.

In line with his orders to not engage equal or superior forces, Meisel sought to end the battle. He believed that the British light cruisers were destroyers, and turned to port to evade a possible torpedo attack. Admiral Hipper's rear turrets continued to fire at Berwick, and her secondary armament engaged the light cruisers.

Meisel was able to break contact at 6:43 am but was sighted by Berwick again at 6:47 am. At this time the British cruiser was on a parallel course approximately 8,000 yards (7,300 m) to the port of Admiral Hipper. Berwick opened fire, and Admiral Hipper fired back. At 7:05 am a 203-millimetre shell disabled one of Berwick's gun turrets, and she was hit below the waterline soon afterwards. Rain squalls then allowed Miesel to evade the British at 7:14 am by sailing north west. The British cruisers rejoined the convoy. Convoy WS 5A's ships had been ordered to scatter at 6:50 am, and it proved difficult to reassemble them. Admiral Hipper did not suffer any damage in this engagement and Berwick required repairs that took six months to complete.

Following the battle Admiral Hipper returned to a course bound for Brest. The ship was continuing to experience engine problems and was running low on fuel. At 10:00 am on 25 December, Admiral Hipper's crew sighted the cargo ship Jumma sailing by itself. She was sunk by a single salvo from the cruiser's 203-millimetre guns and two torpedoes. None of Jumma's crew of 111 survived. Admiral Hipper docked at Brest on 27 December. This made her the first major German warship to arrive at a port in occupied France. Royal Air Force Coastal Command aircraft had attempted to locate Admiral Hipper as she approached Brest, but did not spot her.

== Aftermath ==
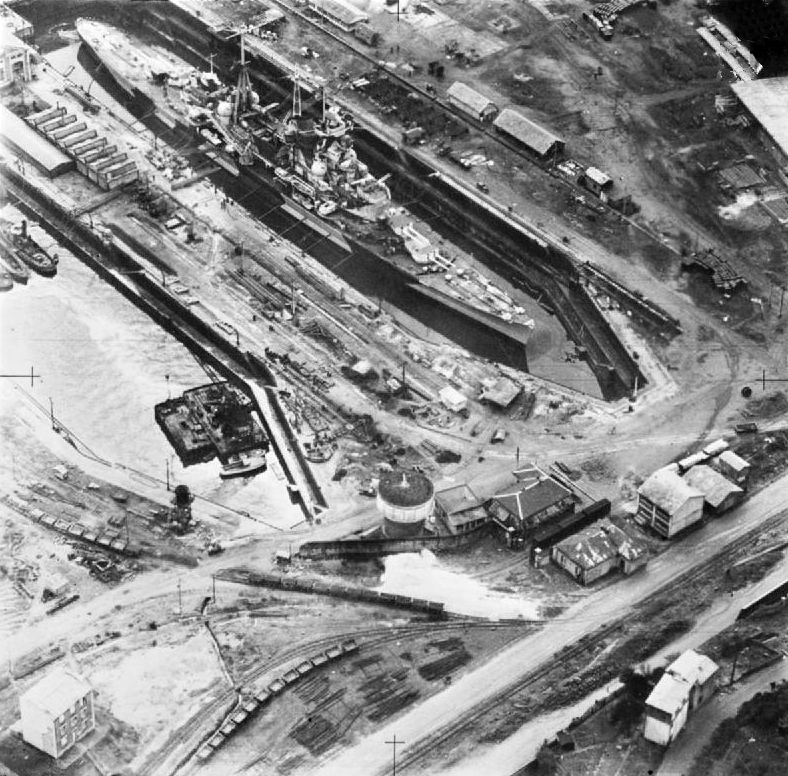
A British photo reconnaissance image of Admiral Hipper in a dry dock at Brest following Operation Nordseetour

The German military was disappointed by the results of Operation Nordseetour. Admiral Hipper did not disrupt Allied shipping, and the sortie demonstrated that she was not well suited to anti-shipping operations in the Atlantic due to her short range and unreliable engines. The engagement with Convoy WS 5A also illustrated the problems with dispatching single raiders into the Atlantic, as Admiral Hipper would have been at great risk had she been damaged. Raeder may have been unhappy with Meisel's decision to fight Berwick.

The attack on Convoy WS 5A demonstrated to the British that surface raiders posed a serious threat to all convoys in the North Atlantic. In response, the Royal Navy immediately began assigning major warships to escort convoys whenever possible. Naiad was ordered to rejoin Convoy WS 5A, and the light cruiser HMS Kenya was dispatched to protect two SL convoys that were approaching the United Kingdom from Sierra Leone. The battlecruiser HMS Repulse and light cruiser HMS Nigeria also sailed to guard convoys in the western Atlantic. Force H, the powerful British squadron based at Gibraltar that included an aircraft carrier and a battlecruiser, also entered the Atlantic on 25 December. The battlecruiser HMS Renown was damaged by a storm. During February and March 1941 escorting battleships forced the Scharnhorst-class battleships to break off two attacks against convoys when they were operating in the Atlantic during Operation Berlin.

Operation Excess was delayed by the disruption caused by the attack on Convoy WS 5A. During the period of delay, a powerful Luftwaffe anti-shipping force arrived in the Mediterranean. The Excess convoy left Gibraltar on 6 January bound for Malta and Greece. On 10 January German aircraft badly damaged the aircraft carrier HMS Illustrious while she was escorting the convoy. This may have been avoided if the Excess convoy had sailed when originally planned.
