= Kurt-Caesar Hoffmann =

German admiral (1895–1988)

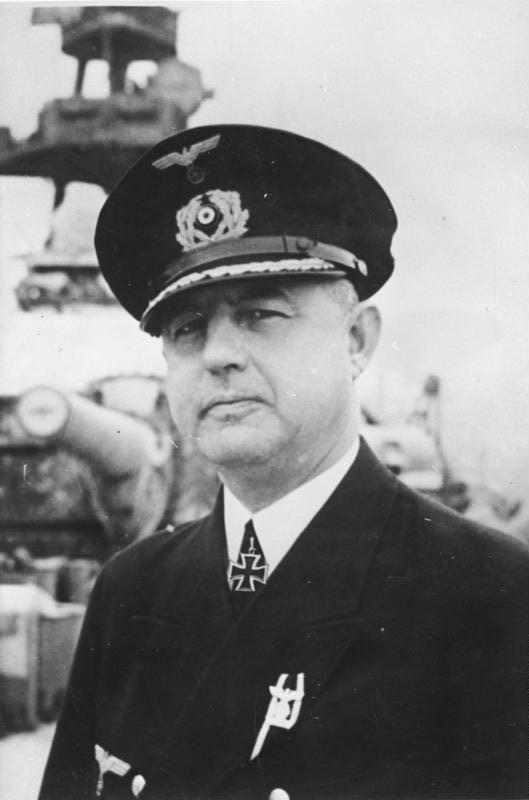
- Born: 26 August 1895; Kiel, German Empire
- Died: 19 May 1988 (aged 92); Mölln, West Germany
- Military career
- Allegiance: German Empire (to 1919); Weimar Republic (to 1933); Nazi Germany; West Germany
- Branch: Imperial German Navy; Reichsmarine; Kriegsmarine; German Navy
- Service years: 1912–1945, 1956–1965.
- Rank: Vizeadmiral
- Units: SMS Hansa; SMS Wettin; Cruiser Köln; Cruiser Amazone
- Commands: Light cruiser Königsberg; Battleship Scharnhorst
- Conflicts: World War I World War II: Operation Weserübung; Operation Juno; Operation Berlin; Operation Cerberus
- Awards: Knight's Cross of the Iron Cross

Kurt-Caesar Hoffmann (26 August 1895 – 19 May 1988) was a senior naval commander in the German Navy (Kriegsmarine) during World War II, who commanded the battleship Scharnhorst. He was a recipient of the Knight's Cross of the Iron Cross.

== Career ==
Hoffmann joined the military service of the Kaiserliche Marine (Imperial Navy) on 1 April 1912 as a Seekadett (midshipman) and took his first ship training on the cruiser SMS Hansa. On 1 April 1913 he underwent further training at the Naval Academy Mürwik, and on 12 April 1913 was promoted to Fähnrich zur See (ensign at sea).

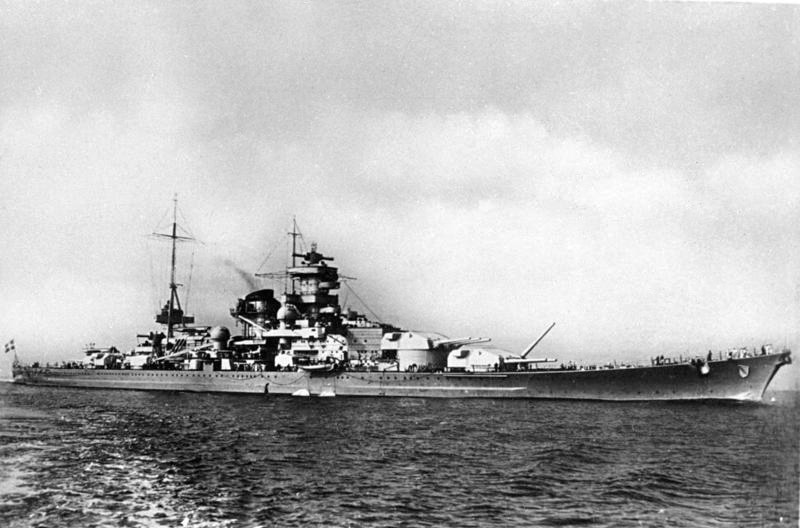
Battleship Scharnhorst, 1939

He relinquished command of the Coastal Artillery School and was appointed commander of the light cruiser Königsberg on 27 June 1939. After the outbreak of World War II, he initially remained in command of Königsberg. On 21 September 1939, he took over command from Kapitän zur See Otto Ciliax of the battleship Scharnhorst. Scharnhorst's first operation began on 21 November 1939, and lasted until 27 November 1939. Accompanied by her sister Gneisenau, the light cruiser Köln, and nine destroyers, Scharnhorst patrolled the area between Iceland and the Faroe Islands. The intent of the operation was to draw out British units and ease the pressure on the heavy cruiser Admiral Graf Spee, which was being pursued in the South Atlantic. Two days later, the German flotilla, under the command of Admiral Wilhelm Marschall aboard Gneisenau, intercepted the auxiliary cruiser Rawalpindi. At 16:07, lookouts aboard Scharnhorst spotted the British vessel, and less than an hour later Scharnhorst had closed the range. At 17:03, Scharnhorst opened fire, and three minutes later a salvo of her 28 cm guns hit Rawalpindi's bridge, killing the captain and the majority of the staff. During the brief engagement, Rawalpindi managed to score a hit on Scharnhorst, which caused minor splinter damage. Rawalpindi was sunk within 40 minutes.

After this, Hoffmann remained at the helm of the Scharnhorst until after the "Channel Dash" in February 1942, thus captaining the ship through Operation Weserübung, Operation Juno, and Operation Berlin.

On 28 March 1942, Hoffmann became the commanding admiral of the German Navy in the Baltic and was promoted to Konteradmiral on 1 April. From 1 July 1942 until 4 March 1943, he was the commanding naval officer of the German Navy in the Netherlands. On being promoted to Vizeadmiral on 1 April 1943, Hoffmann became the head of department for artillery development and construction in the naval armaments office of the German Navy.

On 23 May 1945, after the collapse of Germany, Hoffmann was arrested by British forces, but released on 20 February 1947.

Hoffmann joined the newly formed West German Navy (Marine), and from 26 June 1956 to 31 August 1957, was first deputy head of the Maritime Office Hamburg, thereafter head of administration until his retirement on 31 March 1965.

He married Thidea Theda Emilie Meendsen-Bohlken. They had 1 child.

== Awards ==
- Iron Cross (1914)
  - 2nd Class (1 August 1916)
  - 1st Class (14 February 1918)
- Ritterkreuz II. Klasse des Königlichen Sächsischen Albrechts-Ordens mit Schwertern (14 February 1918)
- Honour Cross of the World War 1914/1918
- Wehrmacht-Dienstauszeichnung 4th to 1st Class
- Clasp of the Iron Cross (1939)
  - 2nd Class (16 October 1939)
  - 1st Class (26 November 1939)
- High Seas Fleet Badge
- Destroyer War Badge
- German Cross in Gold on 20 November 1941 as Kapitän zur See on battleship Scharnhorst
- Knight's Cross of the Iron Cross number 106 of the Kriegsmarine on 21 March 1942 as Kapitän zur See and commander of battleship Scharnhorst
- Cross of Merit 1st Class (15 July 1965)
