= Operation Berlin (Atlantic) =

German commerce raid during the naval battles of the Second World War

- Part of the Battle of the Atlantic of the Second World War
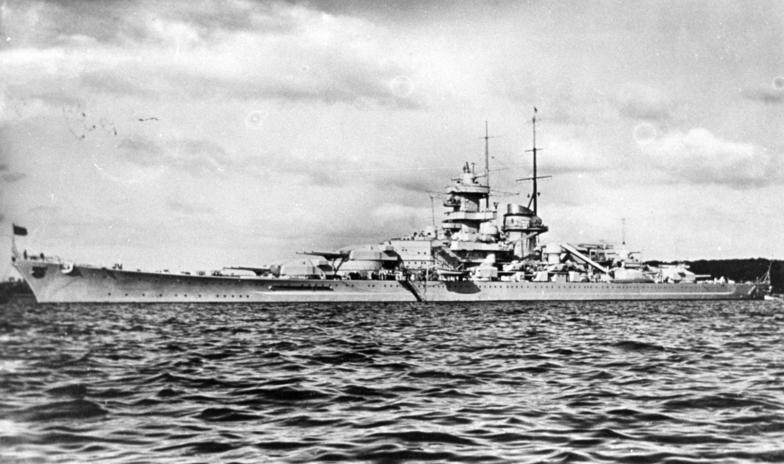
- The German battleship Gneisenau in 1939; she served as the flagship for Operation Berlin
Date	22 January – 22 March 1941
Location	Atlantic Ocean
Result	German victory

Belligerents
Germany	United Kingdom

Commanders and leaders
(Nazi Germany) Günther Lütjens	(United Kingdom) John Tovey

Strength
2 battleships	Large numbers of warships and aircraft

Casualties and losses
None	22 merchant ships sunk or captured

Operation Berlin (German: Unternehmen Berlin) was a raid conducted by the two German Scharnhorst-class battleships against Allied shipping in the North Atlantic between 22 January and 22 March 1941. It formed part of the Battle of the Atlantic during the Second World War. The Scharnhorst and Gneisenau sailed from Germany, operated across the North Atlantic, sank or captured 22 Allied merchant vessels, and finished their mission by docking in occupied France. The British military sought to locate and attack the German battleships but failed to damage them.

The operation was one of several made by German warships during late 1940 and early 1941. Its main goal was for the battleships to overwhelm the escort of one of the convoys transporting supplies to the United Kingdom and then sink large numbers of merchant ships. The British were expecting this given previous attacks and assigned battleships to escort convoys, which proved successful, with the German force having to abandon attacks against convoys on 8 February as well as 7 and 8 March. The Germans encountered and attacked large numbers of unescorted merchant ships on 22 February and 15–16 March.

By the end of the raid, the German battleships had roamed widely across the Atlantic, ranging from the waters off Greenland to the West African coast. The operation was considered successful by the German military, a view generally shared by historians. It was the last victory achieved by German warships against merchant shipping in the North Atlantic, with the sortie made by the battleship Bismarck in May 1941 ending in defeat. Both Scharnhorst-class battleships were damaged by air attacks while they were in France and returned to Germany in February 1942.

== Background ==
=== Opposing plans ===
The Kriegsmarine (German Navy) developed plans before the outbreak of the Second World War to attack Allied merchant shipping in the event of war. Under these plans, warships were to be used against shipping on the high seas and submarines and aircraft would attack shipping near the coasts of Allied countries. Surface raiders were to range widely, make surprise attacks and then move to other areas. They were to be supported by supply ships that would be positioned before the start of operations. Grand Admiral Erich Raeder, the commander of the Kriegsmarine, was determined to include the fleet's battleships in these attacks. He believed that the decision by the Imperial German Navy (Kaiserliche Marine) not to use its battleships aggressively during the First World War was a mistake, and wanted to avoid repeating this perceived error. To conserve the Kriegsmarine's small number of battleships and other big ships for as long as possible, the navy's plans specified that raiders would target merchant vessels and avoid combat with Allied warships.

The Royal Navy anticipated Germany's intentions, and adopted plans to institute convoys to protect merchant shipping and deploy cruisers to detect attempts by German warships to break out into the Atlantic Ocean. These included initiating cruiser patrols of the waters between Greenland and Scotland through which German raiders would have to pass to enter the Atlantic following the outbreak of war. The Home Fleet, the main British battle force in the North Atlantic, was responsible for locating and intercepting German warships in the area. From 20 December 1940 it was commanded by Admiral John Tovey.

Both Scharnhorst-class battleships (sometimes called battlecruisers) Scharnhorst and Gneisenau were combat ready at the start of the war in September 1939. The roles envisioned for these battleships when they were designed in the early 1930s included raiding convoys. They were heavily armoured and faster than the Royal Navy's battlecruisers. Their main armament was nine 11 in (280 mm) guns, which were inferior to the 15 in (380 mm) guns that armed most British battleships. The Scharnhorst-class battleships were capable of sailing for 9,020 mi (14,520 km) at 17 kn (31 km/h; 20 mph). This was insufficient for lengthy raids, and meant that they needed to refuel from supply ships.

=== German surface raids ===
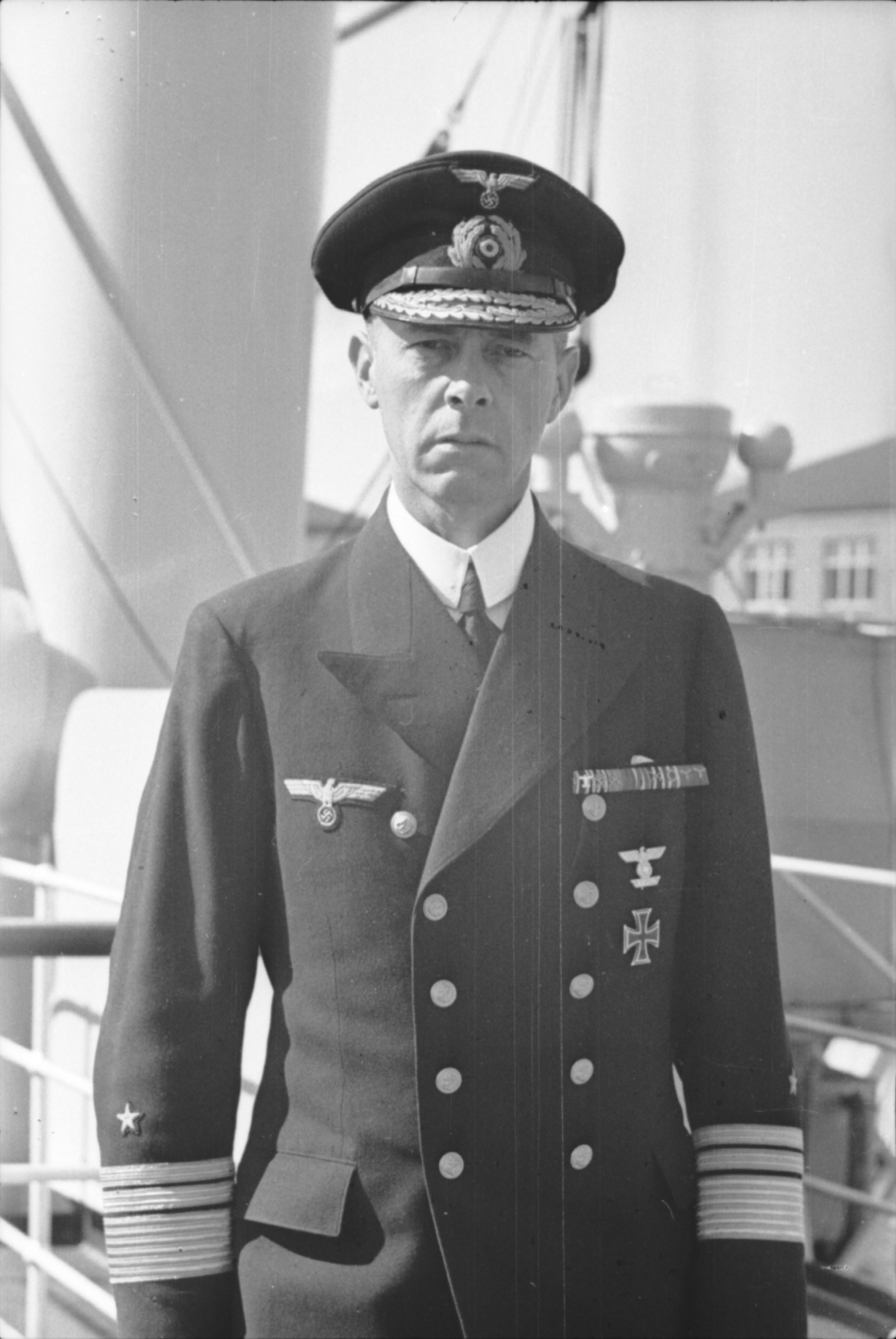
Vice Admiral Günther Lütjens in April 1940

The Scharnhorst-class battleships conducted their first raid in late November 1939. During this operation they sank the armed merchant cruiser HMS Rawalpindi of the Northern Patrol between Iceland and the Faroe Islands on 23 November. Both battleships, accompanied by the heavy cruiser Admiral Hipper and two destroyers, sortied to attack convoys travelling between the Shetland Islands and Norway in Operation Nordmark on 18 February 1940. This force was detected by the British soon after it sailed and the Home Fleet attempted to intercept it. There was no encounter and the German ships returned to port without having met British shipping on 20 February.

In April 1940 the Scharnhorst-class battleships took part in Operation Weserübung, the German invasion of Norway. They formed the most powerful element of the battle group commanded by Vice Admiral Günther Lütjens that served as a covering force to protect the rest of the German invasion fleet from attack by the Royal Navy. On 9 April they encountered the British battlecruiser HMS Renown off the Lofoten Islands. Both German ships were damaged in the Action off Lofoten, leading Lütjens to disengage and return to Germany. The battleships made another sortie on 4 June to raid Allied shipping near Narvik in northern Norway in Operation Juno. On 8 June they sank the empty troop transport SS Orama as well as the British aircraft carrier HMS Glorious and its two escorting destroyers. A destroyer torpedoed Scharnhorst during this action, inflicting damage that took six months to repair. On 20 June Gneisenau took part in a sortie from the occupied Norwegian city of Trondheim. She was torpedoed that day by the submarine HMS Clyde. The torpedo explosion blew large holes in her bow that required lengthy repairs in Germany.

Scharnhorst's repairs were largely completed by late November 1940 and Gneisenau reentered service in early December. The ships trained together in the Baltic Sea during December. After Scharnhorst completed the last element of its repairs, both battleships were assessed on 23 December as being ready for another raid.

In August 1940 the German leader Adolf Hitler ordered an intensification of the attacks on Allied shipping in the Atlantic. The Kriegsmarine began dispatching its major warships that had survived the Norwegian campaign into the Atlantic in October. The heavy cruiser Admiral Scheer sailed during that month, and conducted a successful raid that lasted until March 1941. Admiral Hipper went on the abortive Operation Nordseetour from Germany into the Atlantic during December that ended with her docking at Brest in occupied France. During this operation, Admiral Hipper attacked Convoy WS 5A on 25 December and damaged two transports before being driven off by escorting British cruisers. Six German merchant raiders also operated against Allied shipping in the South Atlantic, Indian and Pacific Oceans. The attack on Convoy WS 5A demonstrated that raiders posed a serious threat to shipping in the North Atlantic, and from early 1941 the British Admiralty assigned battleships to escort convoys that were bound for the United Kingdom whenever possible. Westbound convoys lacked this protection, and were dispersed in the middle of the Atlantic.

== Raid ==
=== First attempt ===
The Scharnhorst-class battleships were selected for the next raid, Operation Berlin. Its goal was for the ships to break out into the Atlantic and operate together to attack Allied shipping. Their primary objective was to intercept one of the HX convoys that regularly sailed from Halifax in Canada to the United Kingdom. These convoys were a key element of the Allied supply line to the United Kingdom, and the Germans hoped that the battleships could overwhelm the convoy's escort and then sink large numbers of merchant ships. Raeder directed the battleships to end their raid by docking at Brest, which had been selected as the Kriegsmarine's main base in October 1940. The orders issued for the operation forbade attacks on convoys escorted by forces of equal strength, such as British battleships. This was because the raid would need to be abandoned if Scharnhorst or Gneisenau was significantly damaged. Lütjens, who had been appointed the Kriegsmarine's fleet commander in July 1940 and promoted to admiral in September that year, commanded the battle group.

Seven supply ships were dispatched into the Atlantic ahead of Operation Berlin to support the two raiders. The plans for the operation also called for Admiral Hipper to sortie from Brest and attack the convoy routes between Gibraltar, Sierra Leone and the United Kingdom. As well as inflicting further casualties, it was hoped that the cruiser would divert British forces away from Lütjens' area of operations. The German B-Dienst signals intelligence service was providing raiders with general information about the locations of Allied ships. The service was generally unable to pass on useful intelligence though, as it was unable to decrypt intercepted radio messages. Each raider embarked a B-Dienst detachment that monitored Allied radio signals and used direction finding techniques to locate convoys and warships. The Germans had little intelligence on the dates on which Allied convoys sailed or the routes they took. This made it difficult for surface raiders to position themselves in the path of convoys.

Berlin was launched on 28 December 1940. Scharnhorst and Gneisenau sailed from Kiel, with Lütjens commanding the force from the latter ship. The raid had to be abandoned before the battleships entered the Atlantic when Gneisenau was damaged by a storm off Norway on 30 December. Lütjens initially took the ships into Korsfjord in Norway and planned to repair Gneisenau at Trondheim, but was ordered to return to Germany. Both ships reached Gotenhafen on 2 January. Gneisenau was transferred to Kiel to be repaired. The battleships received additional small calibre anti-aircraft guns during this period.

=== Breakout into the Atlantic ===
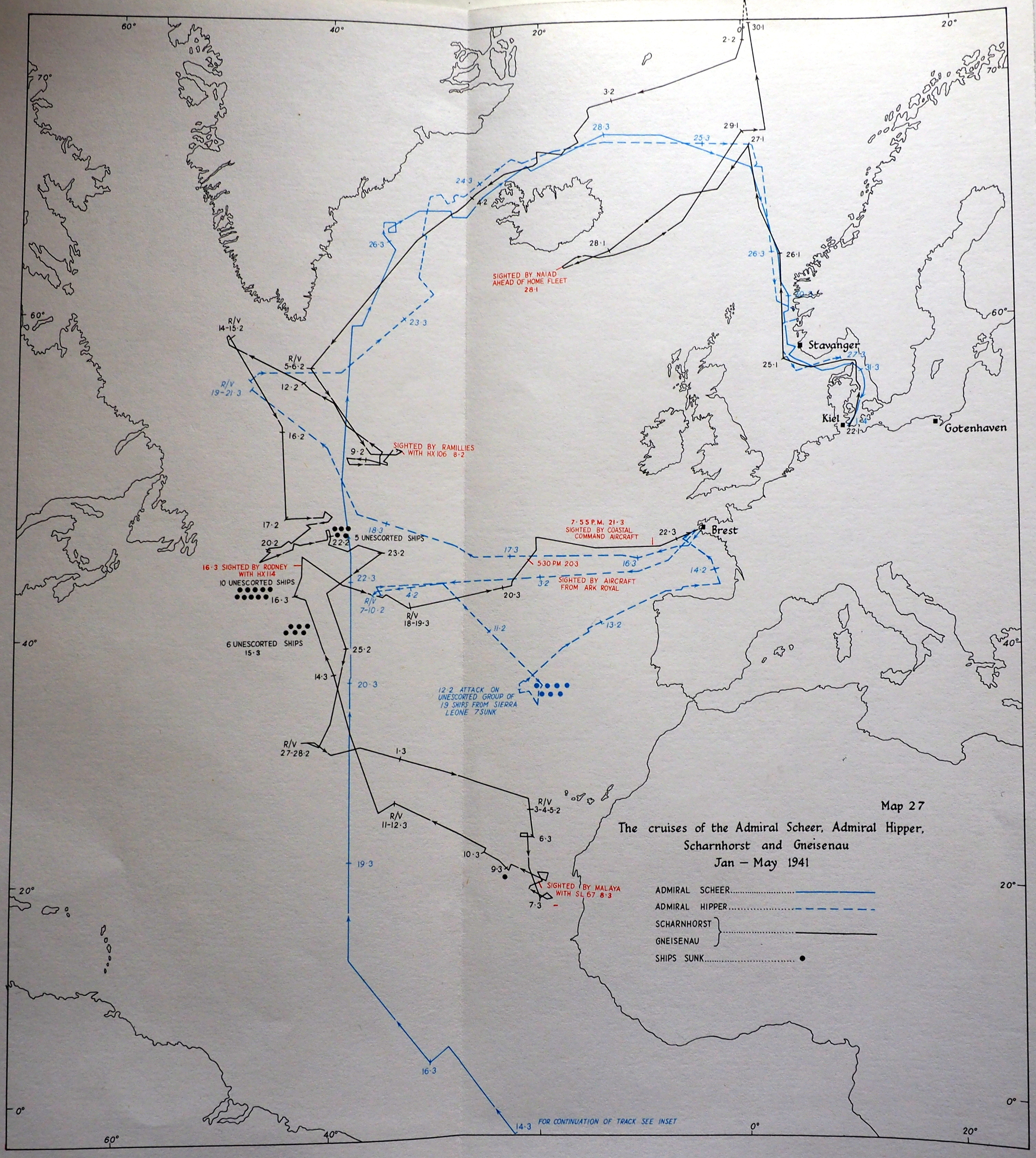
A map depicting the operations of the German warships Admiral Scheer, Admiral Hipper, Scharnhorst and Gneisenau in the Atlantic between January and May 1941.

Scharnhorst and Gneisenau sailed again from Kiel at 4:00 am on 22 January 1941. They proceeded north and passed through the Great Belt island chain in German-controlled Denmark that morning. This exposed the battleships to Allied agents on the shore, but was necessary as the waterway was covered in ice 30 cm (12 in) thick. The battle group reached Skagen on the northern tip of Denmark on the evening of 23 January where it was to meet up with a flotilla of torpedo boats that would escort it through minefields between Denmark and Norway. The torpedo boats were slow to leave port, and Lütjens' force did not resume its voyage until dawn on 25 January.

From intelligence obtained by traffic analysis of German radio signals, the British had concluded that German capital ships were about to put to sea; Ultra intelligence obtained by breaking German codes did not provide any information on Operation Berlin as the British were unable to decrypt the Kriegsmarine's codes. On 20 January the Admiralty warned the Home Fleet that another German raid was likely. Tovey immediately dispatched two heavy cruisers to reinforce the patrols between Allied-occupied Iceland and the Faroe Islands. On 23 January, the British naval attaché in Sweden passed on a report from agents in Denmark that the German battleships had been sighted passing through the Great Belt. This intelligence was provided to Tovey during the evening of 25 January.

The main body of the Home Fleet departed its base at Scapa Flow at midnight on 25 January bound for a position 120 mi (190 km) south of Iceland. It comprised the battleships HMS Nelson (Tovey's flagship) and HMS Rodney, the battlecruiser HMS Repulse, eight cruisers and eleven destroyers. Air patrols of the waters between Iceland and the Faroes were stepped up. Some of the Home Fleet's ships were detached to refuel on 27 January. The Kriegsmarine had expected this deployment, and stationed eight submarines to the south of Iceland to attack the Home Fleet. Only one of these submarines sighted any British warships, and it was unable to reach a position from which they could be attacked.

The German battle group entered the North Sea on 26 January. Lütjens was inclined to refuel from the tanker Adria that had been positioned in the Arctic Ocean before attempting to enter the Atlantic. He decided to proceed directly to the south of Iceland though after receiving a weather forecast which predicted snow storms in that area; these conditions would hide the battleships from the British. Just before dawn on 28 January, the two German battleships detected the British cruiser HMS Naiad and another cruiser by radar to the south of Iceland. Naiad's crew sighted two large vessels six minutes later. Lütjens lacked information about whether the rest of the Home Fleet was at sea, and decided to break off this attempt to enter the Atlantic. The battle group evaded the British by turning to the north-east and operating in the Norwegian Sea north of the Arctic Circle. One of Gneisenau's two aircraft was dispatched to Trondheim in Norway on 28 January carrying a report on the events of the day and did not rejoin its ship. Tovey ordered his cruisers to search for the raiders and moved his battleships and battlecruiser to intercept them but contact was not regained. After concluding that Naiad may have not actually sighted German warships, Tovey sailed west to protect a convoy and returned to Scapa Flow on 30 January. Admiral Hipper departed Brest on 1 February to begin its raid.

After refuelling from Adria in the Arctic Ocean well to the north-east of Jan Mayen island, Lütjens attempted to enter the Atlantic through the Denmark Strait north of Iceland. The battleships passed through the straits undetected on the night of 3/4 February. They refuelled again from the supply ship Schlettstadt off southern Greenland on 5 and 6 February.

=== Initial Atlantic operations ===
From 6 February Lütjens searched for HX convoys. He was aware that two British battleships had been based in Canada to escort eastbound convoys, but believed that they would only cover the first part of the journey before returning to pick up another convoy. Accordingly, the German force operated to the east of what Lütjens believed was the limit of the battleship escorts. Convoy HX 106 was sighted at dawn on 8 February approximately 700 mi (1,100 km) east of Halifax. Unbeknownst to the Germans, this convoy's escort included the old battleship HMS Ramillies.

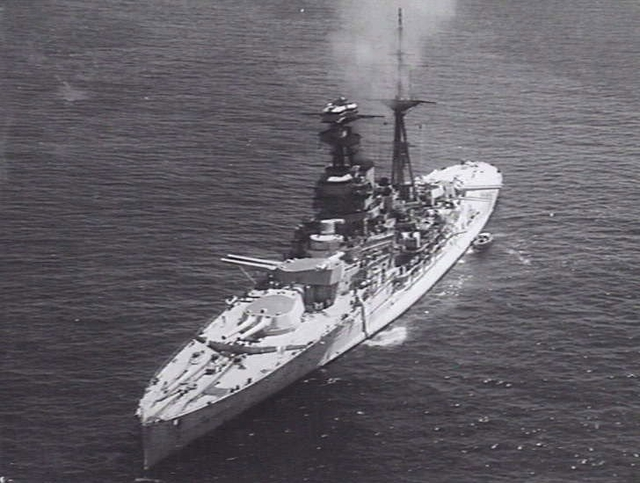
HMS Ramillies in 1939

The German battleships separated to attack the convoy, with Scharnhorst approaching it from the south and Gneisenau from the north-west. Scharnhorst's crew spotted Ramillies at 9:47 am, and reported this to the flagship. In accordance with his orders to avoid engagements with powerful enemy forces, Lütjens cancelled the attack. Before being instructed to break off, Scharnhorst's commanding officer, Captain Kurt-Caesar Hoffmann, brought his ship within 12 mi (19 km) of the convoy in an attempt to draw Ramillies away so that Gneisenau could make a separate attack on the merchant vessels. This violated the order against engaging warships of equal strength, and Lütjens reprimanded Hoffmann by radio when the two battleships met that evening.

The British battleship's crew sighted one of the German ships from a long distance, and misidentified it as probably being an Admiral Hipper-class cruiser. Tovey judged that the ship was either Admiral Hipper or Admiral Scheer, and sailed with all available ships to intercept it if it returned to Germany or France. These ships were organised into three powerful forces from the evening of 9 February, and air patrols were also conducted. Force H, a powerful task force based in Gibraltar that was commanded by Vice Admiral James Somerville and included Renown and the aircraft carrier HMS Ark Royal, was also ordered to protect convoys in the North Atlantic. It sailed from Gibraltar to do so on 12 February, and returned to that port on the 25th of the month.

On the morning of 9 February Naval Group West informed Lütjens that intercepted British radio messages indicated that his ships had been sighted the previous day. Lütjens judged that the British would now assign strong escorts to all convoys in the area, and decided to break off operations for several days in the hope that attacks by Admiral Hipper would divert British forces elsewhere. The German battle group returned to the waters off southern Greenland and remained there until 17 February. It endured a severe storm on 12 February which damaged many of Scharnhorst's gun turrets; it took three days to return them to service. Gneisenau's engines also became contaminated with sea water and needed to be repaired. The battleships refuelled from Schlettstadt and the tanker Esso Hamburg on 14 and 15 February. During this period, Admiral Hipper was involved in attacks on two convoys: on 11 February it sank a straggler from Convoy HG 53 which was scattered after attacks by U-37 and Focke-Wulf Fw 200 Condor long range bombers. The next day the cruiser attacked Convoy SLS 64 which was supposed to merge with Convoy HG 53 on its way to the UK, and sank seven ships. Karl Dönitz, the Befehlshaber der U-Boote (BdU, commander of U-boats) was impressed with these results and sent the U-105, U-106 and U-124 to West African waters for possible combined operations with Scharnhorst and Gneisenau. The cruiser then returned to Brest on 15 February. It was intended for Admiral Hipper to make another raid in support of Operation Berlin after loading more ammunition. This attack was cancelled after she damaged a propeller on a sunken barge in Brest's harbour and was unable to sail until a replacement was received from Kiel.

The German battle group returned to the route between Halifax and the United Kingdom on 17 February. Lütjens decided to operate between the 55th and 45th meridian west, which were to the west of where he had encountered Convoy HX 106, in the correct belief that Allied shipping there was not as well escorted. He hoped to find one of the regular HX convoys or a special convoy that the German naval attaché in Washington, D.C. had reported was expected to depart from Halifax on 15 February. Scharnhorst and Gneisenau searched for convoys in line abreast but out of sight of each other. Two merchant ships sailing independently were sighted from a far distance on 17 and 18 February, but not attacked as there was a risk that these ships could manage to broadcast an alarm, and convoys would be re-routed out of the danger zone. Shortly after dawn on 22 February, Gneisenau found herself cornered between three merchant ships sailing west from a recently dispersed convoy 500 mi (800 km) east of Newfoundland. As detection could not be avoided, the German ships started operations against independent sailing vessels: Gneisenau sank four vessels totalling 19,634 GRT and Scharnhorst sank one for 6,150 GRT. A total of 187 survivors were rescued from these ships. The battleships jammed radio transmissions from the merchant vessels as they closed with them. However, one of the ships was able to transmit a sighting report after being attacked by an aircraft that had been launched from the battleships. The signal was received by a radio station at Cape Race in Newfoundland and was quickly passed on to the Admiralty. This was the first it knew about the battleships' presence in the western Atlantic. Lütjens judged that the Allies would now divert shipping from the area and search for his ships. Accordingly, he decided to transfer his operations to the eastern Atlantic and attack the SL convoys that travelled between Sierra Leone and the United Kingdom.

=== West Africa ===
From 22 February the German ships sailed south. They refuelled from the tankers Ermland and Frederic Breme between 26 and 28 February and then turned to the south-east. The ships searched for a SL convoy that Lütjens expected to encounter on 5 March, but without success. The Seekriegsleitung had neglected to inform Dönitz about the movements of the battleships, so when in the night of 5 March U-124 stumbled upon Scharnhorst and Gneisenau, she prepared to attack. But as the battleships were lacking the destroyer escort which was standard for British battleships, U-124 first sent a sighting report and asked confirmation from Dönitz. Intercepting these communications, the battleships started zigzagging at high speed and disappeared. In the morning of 6 March Gneisenau transferred her damaged seaplane by aircraft crane to Scharnhorst. One of the three seaplanes of Scharnhorst was damaged as well and the idea was to use parts of the one seaplane to repair to other. During the afternoon the battle group rendezvoused with the German submarine U-124. The submarine's commander, Kapitänleutnant Georg-Wilhelm Schulz, provided Lütjens with information about the situation in the area.

On 7 March, a seaplane from the battleship HMS Malaya, which formed part of the escort for Convoy SL 67, spotted the German battleships about 350 mi (560 km) north of the Cape Verde Islands. The battleships sighted the convoy later that day 300 mi (480 km) to the north-east of the Cape Verdes, but Lütjens decided to not attack it after Malaya was identified. Lütjens alerted nearby German submarines to the convoy's location. A plan was developed which involved the submarines sinking Malaya and the battleships then attacking the merchant ships. U-105 and U-124 attacked the convoy that night, sinking five ships for a total of 28,488 GRT. They did not damage Malaya, however. The German battleships searched for the convoy on 8 March, Gneisenau made contact at 1:30 pm. Lütjens attempted to attack at 5:30 pm, but broke off at high speed when Malaya was identified. A seaplane from the British battleship shadowed Gneisenau, but Malaya was unable to pursue the faster German ship. Force H sortied from Gibraltar on 8 March, made contact with SL 67 on 10 March and escorted the convoy until mid-March.

=== Return to the North Atlantic ===
Following the encounter with SL 67, Lütjens decided to return to the convoy route between Halifax and the United Kingdom. While sailing north-west Scharnhorst sank the unescorted merchant vessel SS Marathon on 9 March. By this time both battleships were suffering from serious mechanical problems. Some of Gneisenau's auxiliary systems needed maintenance that was estimated to take four weeks to complete. Scharnhorst was in worse condition, as her boiler superheaters were defective and the pipes that moved steam around the engines had been damaged. The battleships refuelled and received provisions from the supply ships Ermland and Uckermark during 11 and 12 March. Lütjens retained both vessels as scouts with the battle group to extend the area it could search as it progressed north. Together, they were able to search for shipping along a 120 mi (190 km) front.

Ships of the Home Fleet sortied again in response to the presence of the German battleships in the Atlantic. The battleships HMS King George V and Rodney were assigned to escort convoys leaving Halifax on 17 and 21 March. Tovey put to sea on Nelson which, accompanied by the cruiser HMS Nigeria and two destroyers, took up a position south of Iceland to intercept any raiders that were attempting to return to Germany.

On 15 and 16 March, the two battleships, with the two tankers in company, encountered ships from dispersed westbound convoys south of Cape Race. Scharnhorst sank six ships totaling 35,080 GRT, whilst Gneisenau sank seven ships totaling 26,693 GRT, and captured another three tankers, the Bianca, San Casimiro and Polykarp, totaling 20,139 GRT as prizes. Alerted by the distress signals of the victims, Rodney which was close by escorting Convoy HX 114, sped to the scene. On the evening of 16 March Rodney sighted Gneisenau while she was rescuing the survivors of one of the ships she had sunk. Gneisenau managed to escape from the slower but better armed British battleship. Rodney's crew spotted Gneisenau but did not identify her. They learned the warship's identity that evening from survivors of a sunken ship. Meanwhile, Admiral Hipper departed Brest on 15 March to return to Germany via the North Atlantic and Denmark Strait.

The British altered their dispositions following the attacks on 15 and 16 March. The Admiralty did not have any information about Lütjens' intentions, and judged that his force would probably attempt to return to Germany via one of the routes off Iceland. King George V was dispatched from Halifax to patrol the area where the merchant ships had been sunk, but did not encounter the German battleships. Tovey strengthened the Home Fleet's cruiser patrols of the possible German return routes, and remained to the south of Iceland with much of his fleet. Force H was also ordered by the Admiralty to operate in the North Atlantic. The Royal Air Force RAF Coastal Command undertook intensive air patrols of the Denmark Strait and waters between Iceland and the Faroes between 17 and 20 March.

=== Voyage to France ===
Lütjens had received orders on 11 March to cease operations in the North Atlantic by 17 March to support Admiral Hipper and Admiral Scheer's return to Germany. To provide this support, he was to make a diversion between the Azores and the Canary Islands. The German Naval Staff directed him to then return his ships to Brest in France so they could prepare to join a raid into the Atlantic that the battleship Bismarck and heavy cruiser Prinz Eugen were scheduled to make in April. Scharnhorst and Gneisenau refuelled again from Ermland and Uckermark on 18 March, and set course for France the next day.

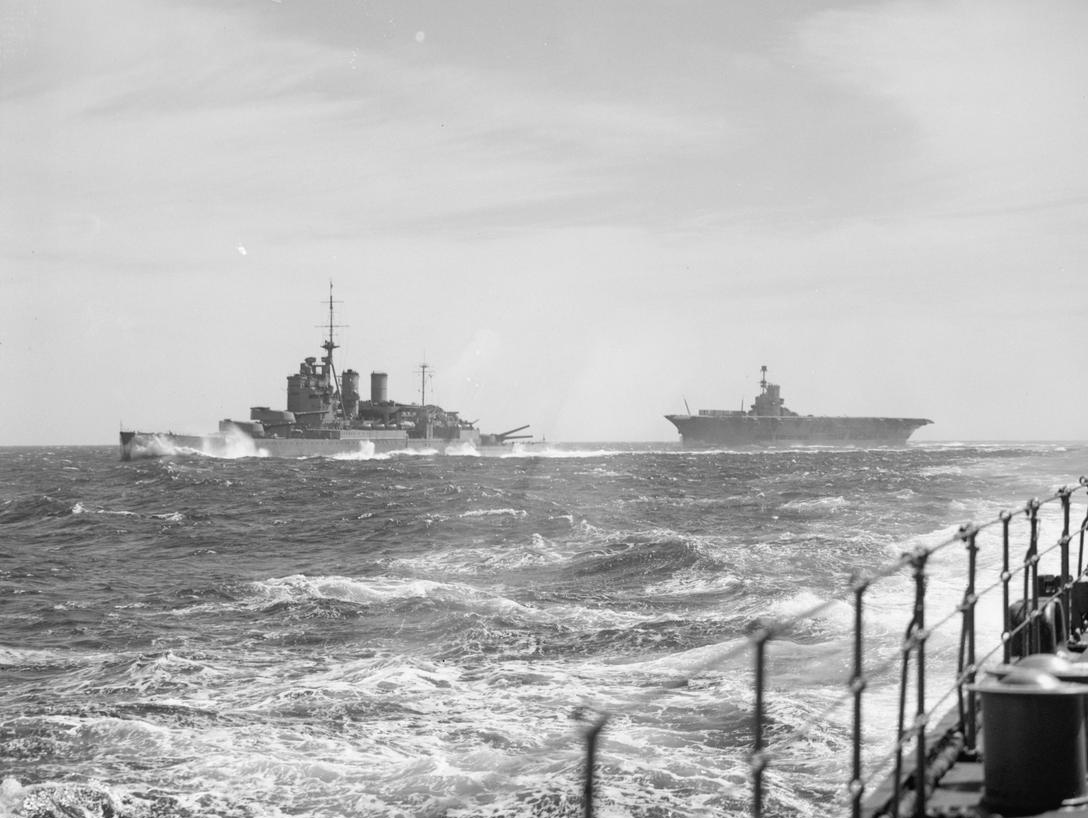
Force H with the battlecruiser HMS Renown and the carrier HMS Ark Royal (picture taken from HMS Sheffield).

At 5:30 pm on 20 March a reconnaissance aircraft flying from Ark Royal spotted the German battleships sailing north-east approximately 600 mi (970 km) to the north-west of Cape Finisterre in Spain. The aircraft's radio was defective, which prevented its crew from immediately reporting this sighting. Lütjens turned to the north in an attempt to deceive the British aircrew about his course. This was successful, as when the aircraft returned to the carrier its crew reported that the German ships were headed north and did not mention their course when first sighted. Somerville's ability to act on this report was further hindered by Ark Royal's failure to immediately pass it on to him. The Bianca and San Casimiro were also located by Ark Royal's aircraft on 20 March and were scuttled when Renown approached them.

After Ark Royal reported the sighting, the British sought to regain contact with the German battleships and track them. At this time the carrier was about 160 mi (260 km) to the south-east of the Germans, which was too great a distance for it to be able to launch an immediate attack. Reconnaissance aircraft operating from Ark Royal searched for the battleships during the night of 20/21 March and the next morning, but were unable to find them again due to bad weather. Coastal Command reduced its patrols of the waters off Iceland and stepped up coverage of the approaches to the Bay of Biscay.

Tovey's force to the south of Iceland had by this time been reinforced by the battleship HMS Queen Elizabeth and battlecruiser HMS Hood. On 21 March the Admiralty ordered him to proceed south at full speed. Several cruisers were also ordered to head south, a destroyer flotilla sailed from Plymouth and RAF Bomber Command established a force of 25 Wellington bombers that could be sent against the battleships. By this time the only way for the British ships to intercept Lütjens' force before they came under the protection of land-based German aircraft in France was for Ark Royal's aircraft to damage one or both of them. This was made impossible by the mishandling of the sighting on 20 March and poor flying weather on that and the subsequent day.

The crew of a Coastal Command Lockheed Hudson detected the German battleships by radar when they were within 200 mi (320 km) of the French coast on the evening of 21 March. By this time it was not possible for the British to attack them, and due to the evasive course Lütjens was taking the British were unable to anticipate which French port he was heading for. The torpedo boats Jaguar and Iltis escorted the battleships into Brest, where they anchored on 22 March. The captured tanker Polykarp docked at Bordeaux two days later. Allied seamen who had been captured from sunken ships were paraded through Brest before being sent to prisoner of war camps in Germany. Admiral Hipper reached Kiel on 28 March, and Admiral Scheer docked there two days later.

== Aftermath ==
=== Analysis ===
Operation Berlin was the most successful of the Kriegsmarine's surface raiding missions. Lütjens' force sank or captured 22 ships totalling 115,622 GRT. The Allied convoy routes across the North Atlantic were badly disrupted, which hindered the flow of supplies to the United Kingdom. By diverting the Home Fleet, the operation also allowed Admiral Hipper and Admiral Scheer safely to return to Germany.

The German Naval Staff and Raeder believed that the success of Operation Berlin and the other raids conducted by surface vessels during 1940 and early 1941 demonstrated that further such attacks remained viable. Raeder travelled to Brest on 23 March, and asked Lütjens to lead the next raid from the Bismarck. Several changes were made to surface raiding tactics based on lessons learned from Operation Berlin. The prohibition against engaging forces of equal strength was softened to allow battleships to engage escorting warships while their accompanying cruisers attacked the convoy. As the intelligence on convoy routes and timings had proven unreliable and Lütjens experienced difficulty searching for convoys, it was decided to station submarines at strategic locations to scout for Allied ships. Tactics that had proven successful, such as keeping the ships of the battle group together and using supply vessels to search for convoys, were retained.

The British were disappointed by their performance during early 1941. While assigning battleships to protect convoys had prevented disastrous losses, the German surface raiders had greatly disrupted the convoy system and not suffered any losses. A key lesson was the need to strengthen patrols of the seas to the north and south of Iceland to detect German raiders as they attempted to enter the Atlantic. This led to additional cruisers being assigned to the area. The British also adjusted their tactics for countering German warships in the Atlantic. This included improving the flow of information to the Admiralty's war room, which coordinated anti-raider operations, and better recognising the critical importance of aircraft carriers for locating and attacking surface raiders.

=== Subsequent operations ===
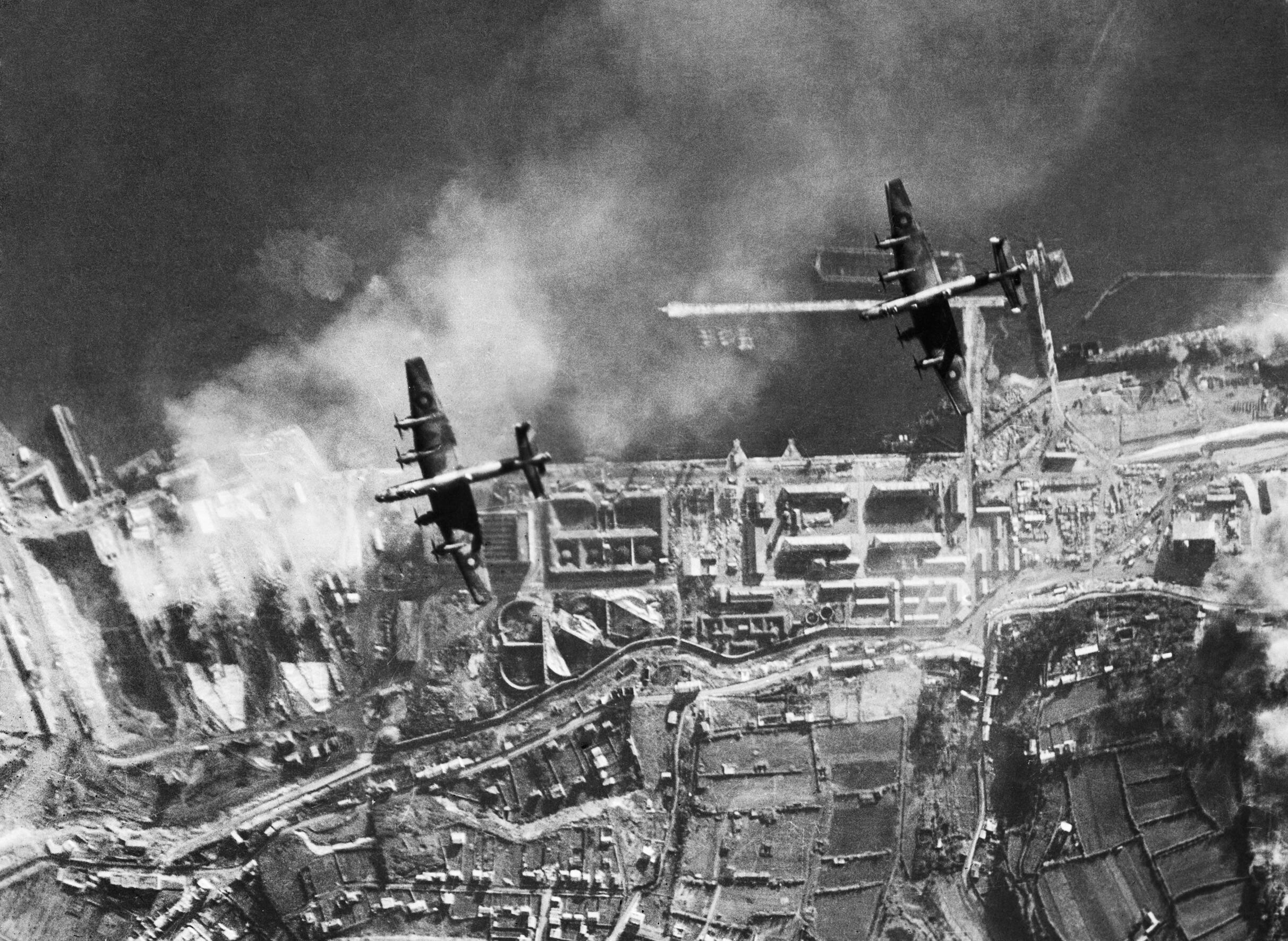
British heavy bombers over Brest during a raid on 18 December 1941 that targeted the Scharnhorst-class battleships

Coastal Command aircraft located the two German battleships at Brest on 28 March after six days of intensive searches of French ports. Once the battleships were confirmed to be in port, the Home Fleet returned to its bases for a brief period and the Atlantic convoy system returned to its normal routings. Due to the threat the force at Brest posed, the Home Fleet blockaded the port and provided powerful escorts to convoys. Submarines were stationed off Brest, and Coastal Command closely monitored it. The Home Fleet maintained three or four naval forces to intercept the German battleships if they left Brest. Force H was also reinforced and patrolled the routes used by north and southbound convoys. Command of the forces operating west of France alternated between Tovey and Somerville.

The RAF made large attacks on the German battleships at Brest. The first raid took place on the night of 30/31 March. On 6 April a British aircraft torpedoed Gneisenau. She was hit by four bombs during another raid on 10 April. It took until the end of 1941 for the damage inflicted by these attacks to be repaired. Scharnhorst required repairs to her boilers which rendered her unable to participate in Operation Rheinübung, the raid into the Atlantic undertaken by Bismarck and Prinz Eugen during May.

Lütjens led Rheinübung from the battleship and sank HMS Hood in the Battle of the Denmark Strait on 24 May. He was killed when Bismarck was sunk by the Home Fleet on 27 May. Guided by Ultra intelligence, the British also sank seven of the eight supply ships that had been sent into the Atlantic to support Bismarck. Following this defeat Hitler forbade further battleship raids into the Atlantic. On 13 June RAF aircraft torpedoed the cruiser Lützow while she was trying to break out into the Atlantic. This was the last raid into the Atlantic attempted by the Kriegsmarine's heavy warships. Operation Berlin was the final success against Allied shipping achieved by German warships in the North Atlantic. Submarines formed the main element of the German anti-shipping campaign for the remainder of the war.

After the repairs to her boilers were completed, Scharnhorst was transferred to La Pallice on 21 July as it was further from the British bomber bases and believed to be at less risk of air attacks. She was hit by five bombs during an air raid on 24 July, and required repairs in Brest that were not completed until 15 January 1942. In line with a decision made by Hitler in September 1941 to concentrate the Kriegsmarine's surface warships in Norway, the Scharnhorst-class battleships were ordered to return to Germany via the English Channel. During the Channel Dash they and Prinz Eugen departed Brest with air cover and naval escort on 11 February 1942. Both battleships were damaged by mines, but reached Germany.

While under repair at Kiel, Gneisenau was badly damaged by an air raid on the night of 26/27 February and never re-entered service. Scharnhorst was deployed to Norway in 1943. As part of an attempted raid against an Allied Arctic convoy, she was sunk by the Home Fleet on 26 December 1943 during the Battle of the North Cape.

=== Historiography ===
Writing in 1954, Stephen Roskill the British official historian stated that Operation Berlin "had been skilfully planned, well co-ordinated with the movements of other raiders and successfully sustained by the supply ships sent out for that purpose" and that the Germans were right to be pleased with the results. Roskill noted that the operations conducted by German surface raiders in the North Atlantic between February and March 1941 was the only period in the war in which surface warships were able to "threaten the whole structure of our maritime control". The British naval historian Richard Woodman judged in 2004 that Operation Berlin did not have significant strategic consequences as Lütjens was unable to cripple Allied shipping in the North Atlantic and attacked only one eastbound HX convoy. Angus Konstam noted in 2021 that the number of ships sunk by German surface raiders was dwarfed by those accounted for by submarines. He concluded that the strategy of sending surface raiders into the Atlantic was faulty as the resources required to build and crew these ships would have produced better results if they had been allocated to the submarine force.

Roskill attributed the British failure to intercept the raiders to bad luck. He judged that the Royal Navy's performance was superior to that in previous operations and demonstrated that it now posed a serious threat to surface raiders. Roskill also observed that assigning battleships to escort convoys "had certainly saved two of them from disaster". The historian Graham Rys-Jones reached a similar conclusion in 1999, noting that Lütjens' success in evading the British was "one of the less helpful lessons of Operation Berlin" as it convinced Raeder that Bismarck could safely operate in the North Atlantic. Writing in 2022, the historian David Hobbs observed that the improved tactics implemented by the Royal Navy following Operation Berlin "proved most valuable during the subsequent operations against the Bismarck".

Historians agree that Raeder's decision to send the two battleships to Brest was a mistake. Lisle A. Rose has noted that by doing so he "placed the big ships under the thumb of Royal Air Force bombers and divided the German battle fleet between the Channel and the Baltic at just the time that new construction cried out for a concentration of forces". Rose notes that this error led to Bismarck and Prinz Eugen lacking the support of the Scharnhorst-class battleships during their sortie in May 1941. Lars Hellwinkel has noted that Brest lacked the facilities rapidly to repair the battleships at the end of Operation Berlin and the vulnerability of French ports to British air attack meant that none of the big warships based there would have been able to conduct any attacks after Bismarck's loss. Raeder acknowledged his error after the war, noting that the forces needed adequately to defend the battleships at Brest had not been available.
