= German battleship Scharnhorst =

Scharnhorst-class battleship of Nazi Germany

Coordinates: 72°16′N 28°41′E

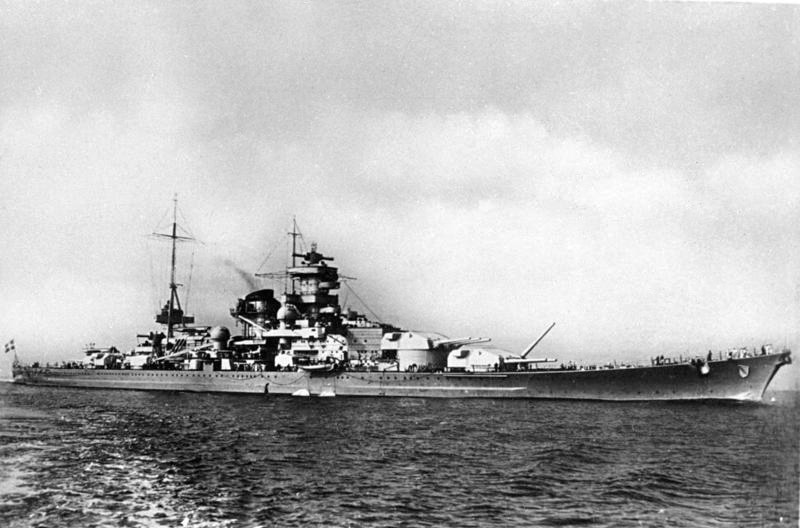
- Scharnhorst

History

Nazi Germany
- Name: Scharnhorst
- Namesake: Gerhard Johann von Scharnhorst (1755–1813)
- Builder: Kriegsmarinewerft Wilhelmshaven
- Laid down: 15 June 1935
- Launched: 3 October 1936
- Commissioned: 7 January 1939
- Motto: Scharnhorst immer voran (Scharnhorst ever onward)
- Fate: Sunk at the Battle of the North Cape on 26 December 1943

General characteristics
- Class & type: Scharnhorst-class battleship
- Displacement: Standard: 32,100 long tons (32,600 t); Full load: 38,100 long tons (38,700 t)
- Length: 234.9 m (770 ft 8 in)
- Beam: 30 m (98 ft 5 in)
- Draft: 9.9 m (32 ft 6 in)
- Installed power: 159,551 shp; 118,977 kW
- Propulsion: 3 Brown, Boveri & Co geared steam turbines
- Speed: 31 knots (57 km/h; 36 mph)
- Range: 7,100 nmi (13,100 km; 8,200 mi) at 19 knots (35 km/h; 22 mph)
- Complement: 56 officers; 1,613 enlisted
- Armament: 9 × 28 cm/54.5 (11 inch) SK C/34; 12 × 15 cm/55 (5.9") SK C/28; 14 × 10.5 cm (4.1 in) SK C/33; 16 × 3.7 cm (1.5 in) SK C/30; 10 (later 16) × 2 cm (0.79 in) C/30 or C/38; 6 × 533 mm (21 inch) torpedo tubes
- Armor: Belt: 320 mm (12.6 in); Deck: 50 to 105 mm (2.0 to 4.1 in); Turrets: 200 to 360 mm (7.9 to 14.2 in); Conning tower: 350 mm
- Aircraft carried: 3 Arado Ar 196A
- Aviation facilities: 1 catapult

Scharnhorst was a German capital ship, alternatively described as a battleship or battlecruiser, of Nazi Germany's Kriegsmarine. She was the lead ship of her class, which included her sister ship Gneisenau. The ship was built at the Kriegsmarinewerft dockyard in Wilhelmshaven; she was laid down on 15 June 1935 and launched a year and four months later on 3 October 1936. Completed in January 1939, the ship was armed with a main battery of nine 28 cm (11 in) C/34 guns in three triple turrets. Plans to replace these weapons with six 38 cm (15 in) SK C/34 guns in twin turrets were never carried out.

Scharnhorst and Gneisenau operated together for much of the early portion of World War II, including sorties into the Atlantic to raid British merchant shipping. During her first operation in November 1939, Scharnhorst sank the armed merchant cruiser HMS Rawalpindi in a short engagement. Scharnhorst and Gneisenau participated in Operation Weserübung, the German invasion of Norway, from April to June 1940. During operations off Norway, the two ships engaged the battlecruiser HMS Renown and sank the aircraft carrier HMS Glorious as well as her escort destroyers Acasta and Ardent. In that engagement Scharnhorst achieved one of the longest-range naval gunfire hits in history.

In early 1942, after British bombing raids, the two ships made the Channel Dash up the English Channel from occupied France to Germany. In early 1943, Scharnhorst joined the Bismarck-class battleship Tirpitz in Norway to interdict Allied convoys to the Soviet Union. Scharnhorst and several destroyers sortied from Norway to attack a convoy but British naval patrols intercepted the German force. During the Battle of the North Cape (26 December 1943), the Royal Navy battleship HMS Duke of York and her escorts sank Scharnhorst. Only 36 men survived, out of a crew of 1,968.

== Design ==
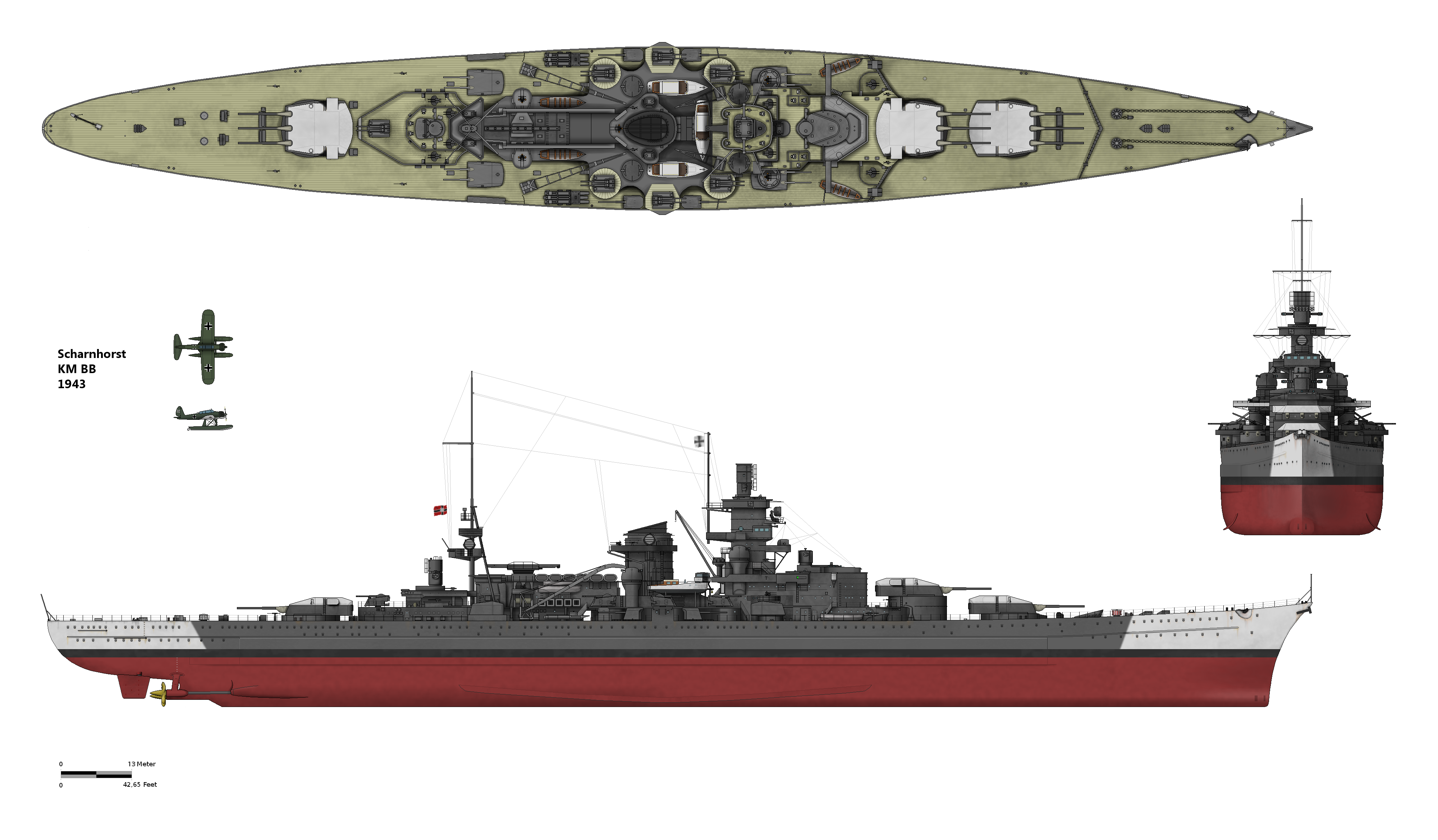
Scharnhorst in her 1943 configuration

Scharnhorst displaced 32,100 long tons (32,600 t) at standard displacement and 38,100 long tons (38,700 t) at full load. She was 234.9 m (770 ft 8 in) long overall and had a beam of 30 m (98 ft 5 in) and a maximum draft of 9.9 m (32 ft 6 in). She was powered by three Brown, Boveri & Cie geared steam turbines, which developed a total of 159,551 shp; 118,977 kW and yielded a maximum speed of 31.5 knots (58.3 km/h; 36.2 mph) on speed trials. Her standard crew numbered 56 officers and 1,613 enlisted men, augmented during the war to 60 officers and 1,780 men. While serving as a squadron flagship, Scharnhorst carried an additional 10 officers and 61 enlisted men.

She was armed with a main battery of nine 28 cm (11.1 in) L/54.5 guns arranged in three triple gun turrets: two turrets were placed forward in a superfiring arrangement (Anton and Bruno), and one aft (Caesar). The design also enabled the ship to be up-gunned with six 15-inch guns, which never took place. Her secondary armament consisted of twelve 15 cm (5.9 in) L/55 guns, eight of which were placed in two-gun turrets and the remaining four were carried in individual turrets. Her heavy anti-aircraft armament consisted of fourteen 10.5 cm L/65. These guns were directed by four SL-6 stabilized anti-aircraft director posts. The light anti-aircraft armament consisted of sixteen 3.7 cm (1.5 in) SK C/30 L/83, and initially ten 2 cm (0.79 in) C/30 anti-aircraft guns. The number of 2 cm guns was eventually increased to thirty-eight. Two triple 53.3 cm (21 in) above-water torpedo tubes, taken from the light cruiser Nürnberg, were installed in 1941.

Scharnhorst had an armor belt that was 320 mm (12.6 in) thick in the central portion, where it protected the ship's ammunition magazines and propulsion machinery spaces. The ship had an armored deck that was 20 to 40 mm (0.79 to 1.57 in) thick on the flat portion, increasing to 105 mm (4.1 in) on downward-sloping sides that connected to the bottom of the belt. Her main battery turrets had 360 mm (14 in) of armor on their faces and 200 mm (7.9 in) on their sides. The conning tower was protected with 350 mm on the sides.

== Commanding officers ==
At her commissioning, Scharnhorst was commanded by Kapitän zur See (KzS) Otto Ciliax. His tenure as the ship's commander was brief; in September 1939, an illness forced him to go on sick leave, and he was replaced by KzS Kurt-Caesar Hoffmann. Hoffmann served as the ship's captain until 1942. On 1 April 1942, Hoffmann, who had been promoted to Konteradmiral (Rear Admiral) and awarded the Knight's Cross, transferred command of the ship to KzS Friedrich Hüffmeier. In October 1943, shortly before Scharnhorst's last mission, Hüffmeier was replaced by KzS Fritz Hintze, who was killed during the ship's final battle.

== Service history ==
Scharnhorst in the Kiel Canal (Rendsburg High Bridge in the background)

Scharnhorst was ordered as Ersatz Elsass as a replacement for the old pre-dreadnought Elsass, under the contract name "D." The Kriegsmarinewerft in Wilhelmshaven was awarded the contract, where the keel was laid on 16 July 1935. The ship was launched on 3 October 1936, witnessed by Adolf Hitler, Minister of War Generalfeldmarschall Werner von Blomberg, and the widow of Kapitän zur See Schultz, the commander of the armored cruiser Scharnhorst, which had been sunk at the Battle of the Falkland Islands during World War I. Fitting-out work followed her launch, and was completed by January 1939. Scharnhorst was commissioned into the fleet on 9 January for sea trials, which revealed a dangerous tendency to ship considerable amounts of water in heavy seas. This caused flooding in the bow and damaged electrical systems in the forward (Anton) gun turret. As a result, she went back to the dockyard for extensive modification of the bow. The original straight stem was replaced with a raised "Atlantic bow." A raked funnel cap was also installed during the reconstruction, along with an enlarged aircraft hangar; the main mast was also moved further aft. The modifications were completed by November 1939, by which time the ship was finally fully operational.

Scharnhorst's first operation began on 21 November 1939; the ship, and her sister Gneisenau, was to attack the Northern Patrol between Iceland and the Faroe Islands. The intent of the operation was to draw out British units and ease the pressure on the heavy cruiser Admiral Graf Spee, which was being pursued in the South Atlantic. A patrol line of four U-boats was stationed in the North Sea to intercept any sortie from the Home Fleet. The two battleships left Wilhelmshaven in company of the light cruisers Köln and Leipzig, and three destroyers, which parted company in the morning of 22 November for operations in the Skagerrak. The next day, the German battleships intercepted the British armed merchant cruiser Rawalpindi. At 16:07, lookouts aboard Scharnhorst spotted the vessel, and less than an hour later Scharnhorst had closed the range. At 17:03, Scharnhorst opened fire, and three minutes later a salvo of her 28 cm guns hit Rawalpindi's bridge, killing the captain Edward Kennedy, and the majority of the officers. During the brief engagement, Rawalpindi managed to score a hit on Scharnhorst, which caused minor splinter damage.

By 17:16, Rawalpindi was burning badly and in the process of sinking. Admiral Wilhelm Marschall, aboard Gneisenau, ordered Scharnhorst to pick up survivors. These rescue operations were interrupted by the appearance of the cruiser Newcastle. Based on the reports of Rawalpindi and Newcastle, the British deployed the Home Fleet with the battleships Nelson and Rodney from the Clyde towards Norway in case the Germans intended to return to Germany, and the battlecruisers Hood and the French Dunkerque left from Devonport towards Iceland to prevent a breakout towards the Atlantic. Aware of these deployments through the B-Dienst, Marschall retreated northwards and waited for bad weather in order to break through a British cruiser and destroyer patrol line between Shetland and Norway. The Germans reached Wilhelmshaven on 27 November, and on the trip both battleships incurred significant damage from heavy seas and winds. Scharnhorst was repaired in Wilhelmshaven, and while in dock, her boilers were overhauled.

Following the completion of repairs, Scharnhorst went into the Baltic Sea for gunnery training. Heavy ice in the Baltic kept the ship there until February 1940 when she could return to Wilhelmshaven, arriving on 5 February. Between 18 February and 20 February, she participated in Operation Nordmark, a brief sortie into the North Sea as far as the Shetland Islands.

=== Operation Weserübung ===
She was then assigned to the forces participating in Operation Weserübung, the invasion of Denmark and Norway. Scharnhorst and Gneisenau were the covering force for the assaults on Narvik and Trondheim; the two ships left Wilhelmshaven on the morning of 7 April under the command of Vice Admiral Günther Lütjens. They were joined by the invasion force for Trondheim, consisting of the heavy cruiser Admiral Hipper and four destroyers, and by the invasion force for Narvik, consisting of ten destroyers. Between 14:25 and 14:48 on 7 April, the ships were unsuccessfully attacked west of the Skagerrak by twelve bombers. By evening the weather had deteriorated and several destroyers could not keep up the high (27 knots, 50 km/h, 31 mph) speed and remained behind the main force. Heavy winds caused significant structural damage that evening, and flooding contaminated a portion of Scharnhorst's fuel stores. On 8 April at 09:15 one of the trailing destroyers, Bernd von Arnim, signalled a fight with a British destroyer and at 09:22 Lütjens ordered Admiral Hipper to investigate. The German cruiser found the British destroyer HMS Glowworm and hit her with accurate artillery fire. Before Glowworm sank, she attempted to ram and damage Admiral Hipper and sent out a warning message to the British fleet. Shortly after the fight with Glowworm, Admiral Hipper and her four destroyers set course for Trondheim, and at 22:00 the ten destroyers left for Narvik, whilst Scharnhorst and Gneisenau took a position south of the Lofoten in the Vestfjorden to cover both landings.

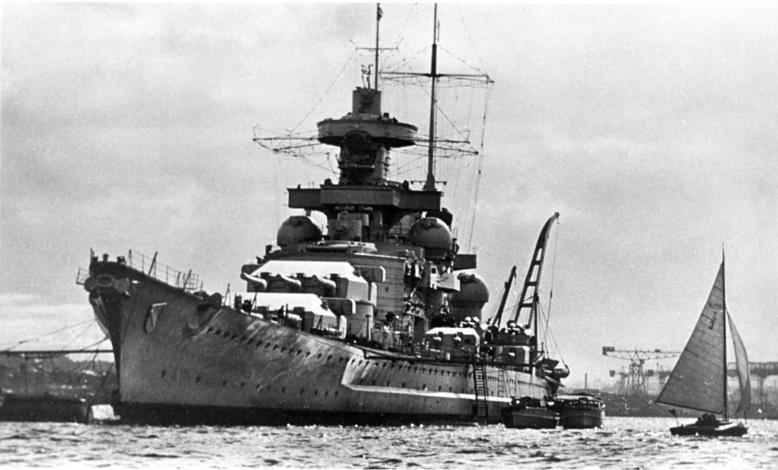
Scharnhorst in port

Early on 9 April, the two ships encountered the British battlecruiser HMS Renown. Gneisenau's Seetakt radar picked up a radar contact at 04:30, which prompted the crews of both vessels to go to combat stations. Half an hour later, Scharnhorst's navigator spotted gun flashes from Renown firing at Gneisenau; the Germans returned fire three minutes later. Gneisenau was hit twice in the opening portion of the engagement, and one shell disabled her rear gun turret. Scharnhorst's radar malfunctioned, which prevented her from being able to effectively engage Renown during the battle. At 05:18, the British battlecruiser shifted fire to Scharnhorst, which maneuvered to avoid the falling shells. By 07:15, Scharnhorst and Gneisenau had used their superior speed to escape from the pursuing Renown. Heavy seas and the high speed with which the pair of battleships escaped caused them to ship large amounts of water forward. Scharnhorst's forward (Anton) turret was put out of action by severe flooding. Mechanical problems with her starboard turbines developed after running at full speed, which forced the ships to reduce speed to 25 knots (46 km/h; 29 mph).

Scharnhorst and Gneisenau had reached a point north-west of Lofoten, Norway, by 12:00 on 9 April. The two ships then turned west for 24 hours while temporary repairs were effected. After a day of steaming west, the ships turned south. Since broadcasting radio messages would betray the position of the ships to the British, an Arado 196 float plane was launched by Scharnhorst on 10 April at 12:00 with the instruction to fly in the direction of Norway and to signal there the intentions of Lütjens to break through to Germany in the night of 11 April. The plane was launched at extreme range and could barely reach the outer islands on the Norwegian coast where it managed to send its message. The float plane was towed to Trondheim where it could also convey Lütjens's order to Admiral Hipper to join the German battleships in the return journey to Germany. Admiral Hipper joined in the morning of 12 April but her four destroyers had to stay back at Trondheim because of lack of fuel. A Royal Air Force (RAF) patrol aircraft spotted the three ships that day, and 82 RAF Bomber Command and nine RAF Coastal Command aircraft were ordered to attack the ships. The German warships were protected by poor visibility, however, and none of the bombers found the ships whilst losing nine of their number to German fighters. The three ships safely reached Wilhelmshaven at 22:00. Scharnhorst was repaired at the Deutsche Werke in Kiel. During the repair process, the aircraft catapult that had been installed on the rear (Caesar) gun turret was removed.

=== Operation Juno ===
The two ships left Wilhelmshaven on 4 June to return to Norway. They were joined by Admiral Hipper and four destroyers. The purpose of the sortie was to interrupt Allied efforts to resupply the Norwegians and to relieve the pressure on German troops fighting in Norway. On 7 June, the squadron rendezvoused with the tanker Dithmarschen to refuel Admiral Hipper and the four destroyers. The next day, the British trawler HMT Juniper was discovered and sunk, along with the 5,666 GRT oil tanker Oil Pioneer. The Germans then launched their Ar 196 float planes to search for more Allied vessels. Admiral Hipper and the destroyers were sent to destroy Orama, a 19,840 GRT passenger ship, while Atlantis, a hospital ship, was allowed to proceed unmolested. Admiral Marschall detached Admiral Hipper and the four destroyers to refuel in Trondheim, while he would steam to the Harstad area.

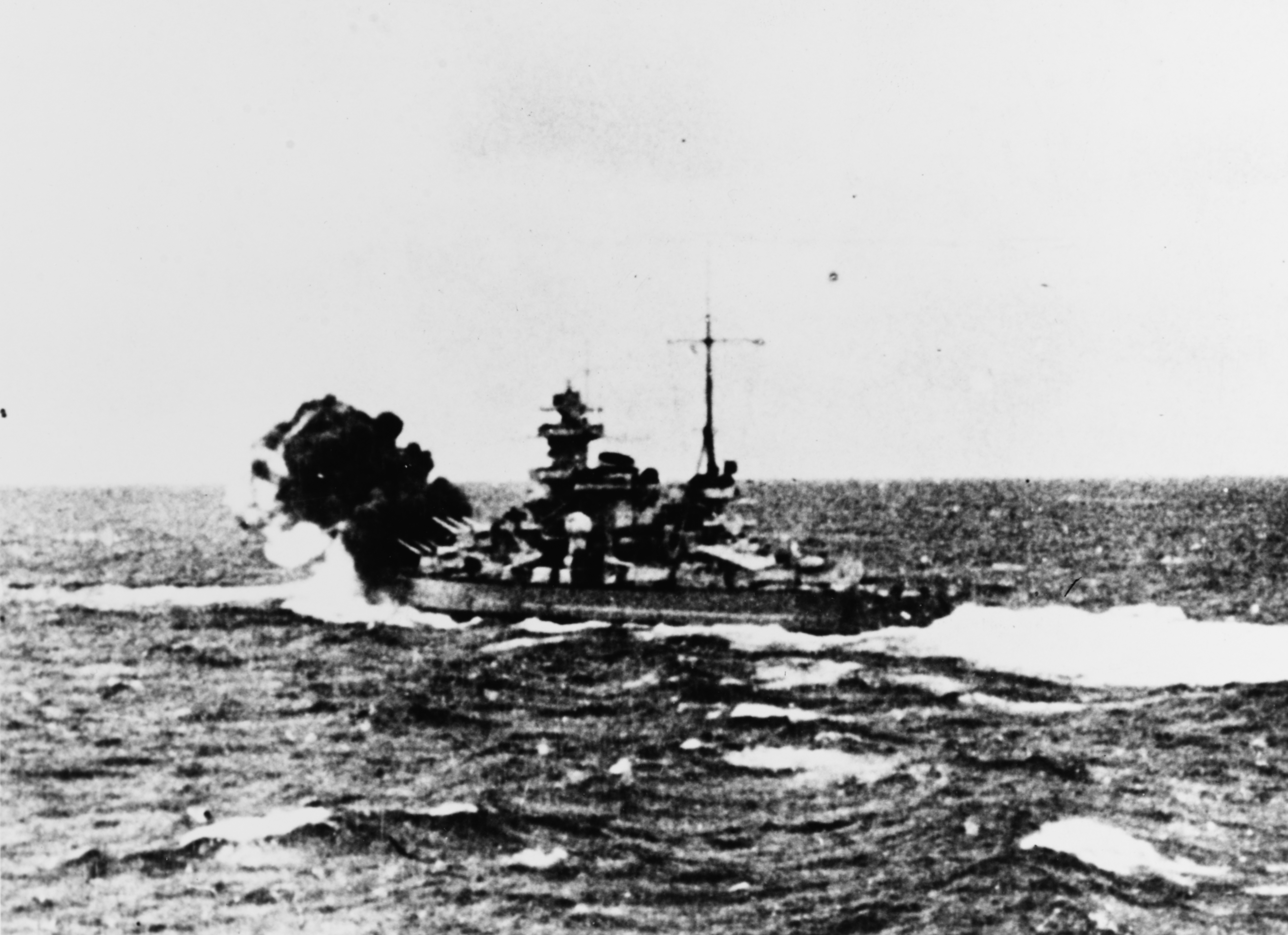
Scharnhorst firing on HMS Glorious, 8 June 1940

At 17:45, the German battleships spotted the British aircraft carrier Glorious and two escorting destroyers, Ardent and Acasta, at a range of some 40,000 m (44,000 yd; 25 mi). At 18:32 Scharnhorst (as the closer ship) opened fire with her main armament on Glorious, at a range of 26,000 m (28,000 yd; 16 mi). Six minutes after opening fire, Scharnhorst scored a hit at a range of 25,600 m (28,000 yd; 15.9 mi). The shell struck the carrier's upper hangar and started a large fire. Less than ten minutes later, a shell from Gneisenau struck the bridge and killed Glorious's captain. The two destroyers attempted to cover Glorious with smoke screens, but the German battleships could track the carrier with their radar. By 18:26 the range had fallen to 24,100 m (26,400 yd; 15.0 mi), and Scharnhorst and Gneisenau were firing full salvos at the carrier. After approximately an hour of shooting, the German battleships sent Glorious to the bottom. They also sank the two destroyers. As Acasta sank, one of the four torpedoes she had fired hit Scharnhorst at 19:39. Acasta also hit Scharnhorst's forward superfiring turret with her 4.7-inch QF guns, which did negligible damage. The torpedo hit caused serious damage; it tore a hole 14 by 6 m (15.3 by 6.6 yd) and allowed 2,500 t (2,500 long tons; 2,800 short tons) of water into the ship. The rear (Caesar) turret was disabled and 48 men were killed. The flooding caused a 5 degree list, increased the stern draft by almost a meter, and forced Scharnhorst to reduce speed to 20 knots (37 km/h; 23 mph). The ship's machinery was also significantly damaged by the flooding, and the starboard propeller shaft was destroyed.

The damage was severe enough to force Scharnhorst to put into Trondheim for temporary repairs. She reached port on the afternoon of 9 June, where the repair ship Huaskaran was waiting. The following day a reconnaissance plane from RAF Coastal Command spotted the ship, and a raid by twelve Hudson bombers took place on 11 June. The Hudsons dropped thirty-six 227 lb (103 kg) armor-piercing bombs, which all missed. The Royal Navy joined in the attacks on the ship by sending the battleship Rodney and the aircraft carrier Ark Royal. On 13 June, Ark Royal launched fifteen Skua dive bombers; German fighters intercepted the attackers and shot eight of them down. The other seven made it past the air defenses and attacked Scharnhorst, but only scored one hit, and the bomb failed to detonate. Preliminary repairs were completed by 20 June, which permitted the ship to return to Germany. While Scharnhorst was en route under heavy escort on 21 June, the British launched two air attacks, six Swordfish torpedo bombers in the first and nine Beaufort bombers in the second. Both were driven off by anti-aircraft fire and fighters. The Germans intercepted British radio traffic that indicated the Royal Navy was at sea, which prompted Scharnhorst to make for Stavanger. British warships were within 35 nmi (65 km; 40 mi) of Scharnhorst's position when she turned to Stavanger. The next day, Scharnhorst left Stavanger for Kiel, where repairs were carried out, lasting some six months.

=== Operation Berlin ===
Following the completion of repairs, Scharnhorst underwent trials in the Baltic before returning to Kiel in December 1940. There she joined Gneisenau, in preparation for Operation Berlin, a planned raid into the Atlantic Ocean designed to wreak havoc on the Allied shipping lanes. The ships left Kiel on 28 December, but off Norway a severe storm caused damage to Gneisenau, Scharnhorst was undamaged. The two ships were forced to return: Scharnhorst went to Gotenhafen while Gneisenau went to Kiel for repairs. Repairs were quickly completed, and on 22 January 1941, the two ships, under the command of Admiral Günther Lütjens on Gneisenau, left port for the North Atlantic. They were detected in the Skagerrak and the British Home Fleet deployed to block a breakout into the Atlantic. In the passage between Iceland and the Faroes, the Germans' radar detected the patrolling British cruiser Naiad at long range, which allowed Lütjens to retreat unseen, with the aid of a squall. After refueling from Adria in the Arctic Ocean on 30 January, the battleships entered the Atlantic undetected through the Denmark Strait during the night of 3/4 February.

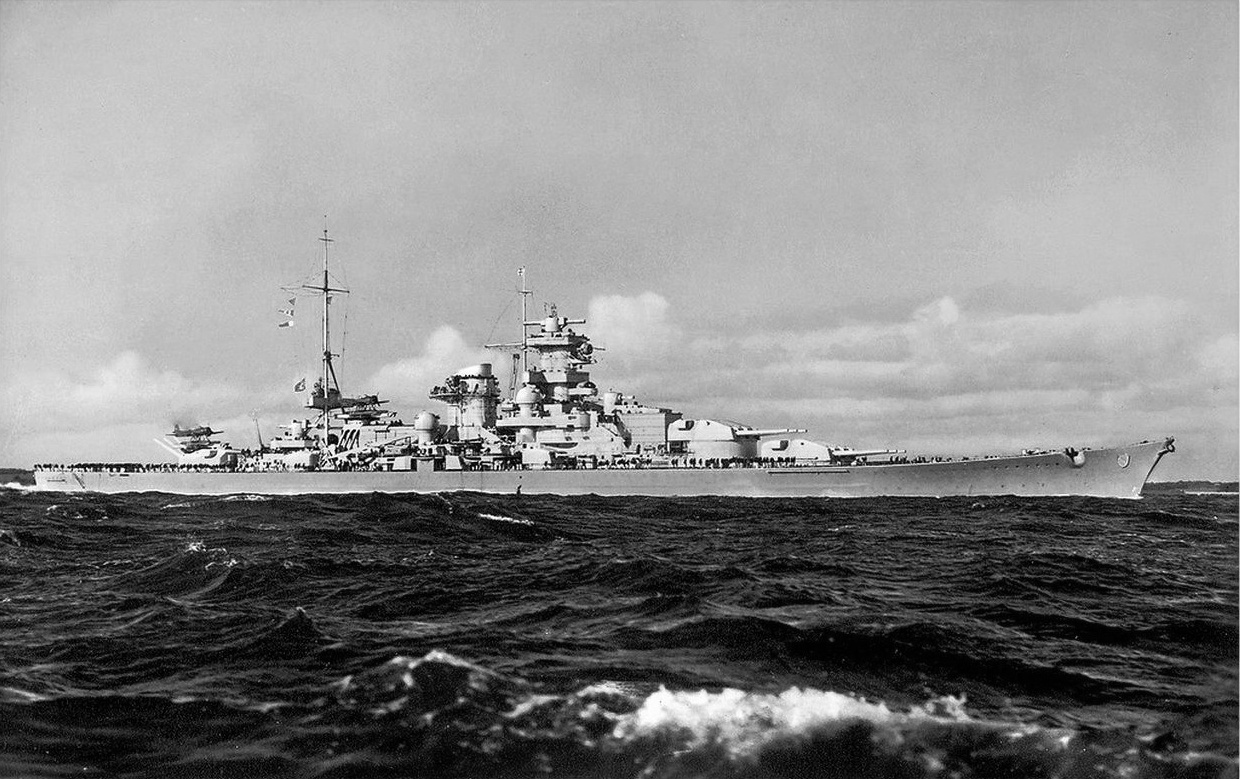
Scharnhorst at sea

On 6 February, the two ships refueled from the tanker Schlettstadt south of Cape Farewell. Shortly after 08:30 on 8 February, lookouts spotted convoy HX 106, escorted by the battleship Ramillies. Lütjens' orders prohibited him from engaging Allied capital ships, and so the attack was called off. Scharnhorst's commander, KzS Hoffmann, however, closed to 23,000 m (25,000 yd) in an attempt to lure Ramillies away from the convoy so that Gneisenau could attack the convoy. Lütjens ordered Hoffmann to rejoin the flagship immediately. After being detected, the battleships steamed off to the north for a few days to refuel and then returned to the same shipping lanes but closer to Newfoundland to search for more shipping. On 22 February, Gneisenau ran into three independently sailing merchant ships from a recently dispersed convoy. The battleships abandoned their search for convoys and started to hunt independent ships; Gneisenau sank four vessels totalling 19,634 GRT and Scharnhorst sank the 6,150 GRT tanker Lustrous.

Since some of the victims were able to alert the British, Lütjens then decided to move away from the North-Atlantic convoy lanes and move to the West African convoy lanes. Karl Dönitz, the commander of the U-boats, sent the three U-boats U-105, U-106 and U-124 to West African waters for possible combined operations with Scharnhorst and Gneisenau. On 6 March the battleships met U-124 northwest of Cape Verde in order to discuss cooperation. The next morning the two ships encountered convoy SL 67, escorted by the battleship Malaya. Lütjens again forbade an attack, but he shadowed the convoy and directed the U-boats to attack the convoy and sink Malaya. U-105 and U-124 attacked during the night of 8/9 March and sank five ships for a total of 28,488 GRT but could not find Malaya. The next morning Gneisenau approached the convoy but again Lütjens turned away when Malaya closed to 24,000 m (26,000 yd), well within the range of the Germans' guns. He instead turned toward the mid-Atlantic, where Scharnhorst sank the 7,921 GRT Greek cargo ship Marathon. The two ships then refueled from the tankers Uckermark and Ermland on 12 March.

On 15 and 16 March, the two battleships, with the two tankers in company, encountered ships from a dispersed convoy in the mid-Atlantic. Scharnhorst sank six ships totaling 35,080 GRT, whilst Gneisenau sank seven ships totaling 26,693 GRT and captured another three ships totaling 20,139 GRT as prizes. Alerted by distress signals of the victims, the British battleship Rodney left convoy HX 114 and in the evening was able to surprise Gneisenau. The German battleship used her high speed to escape in the darkness, but this intervention convinced Lütjens that the chances of further success were small. He therefore decided to head for Brest in occupied France, which the ships reached on 22 March. Throughout the operation, Scharnhorst had difficulties with the superheater tubes in her boilers. Replacement of the defective tubes was carried out by French naval dockyard workers – to a higher standard, according to Scharnhorst's captain, than could be achieved at the time in the naval yards in Germany. Repair work lasted until July, which caused the ship to be unavailable during Operation Rheinübung, the sortie by the new battleship Bismarck in May 1941.

=== Air raids in Brest, 1941–42 ===
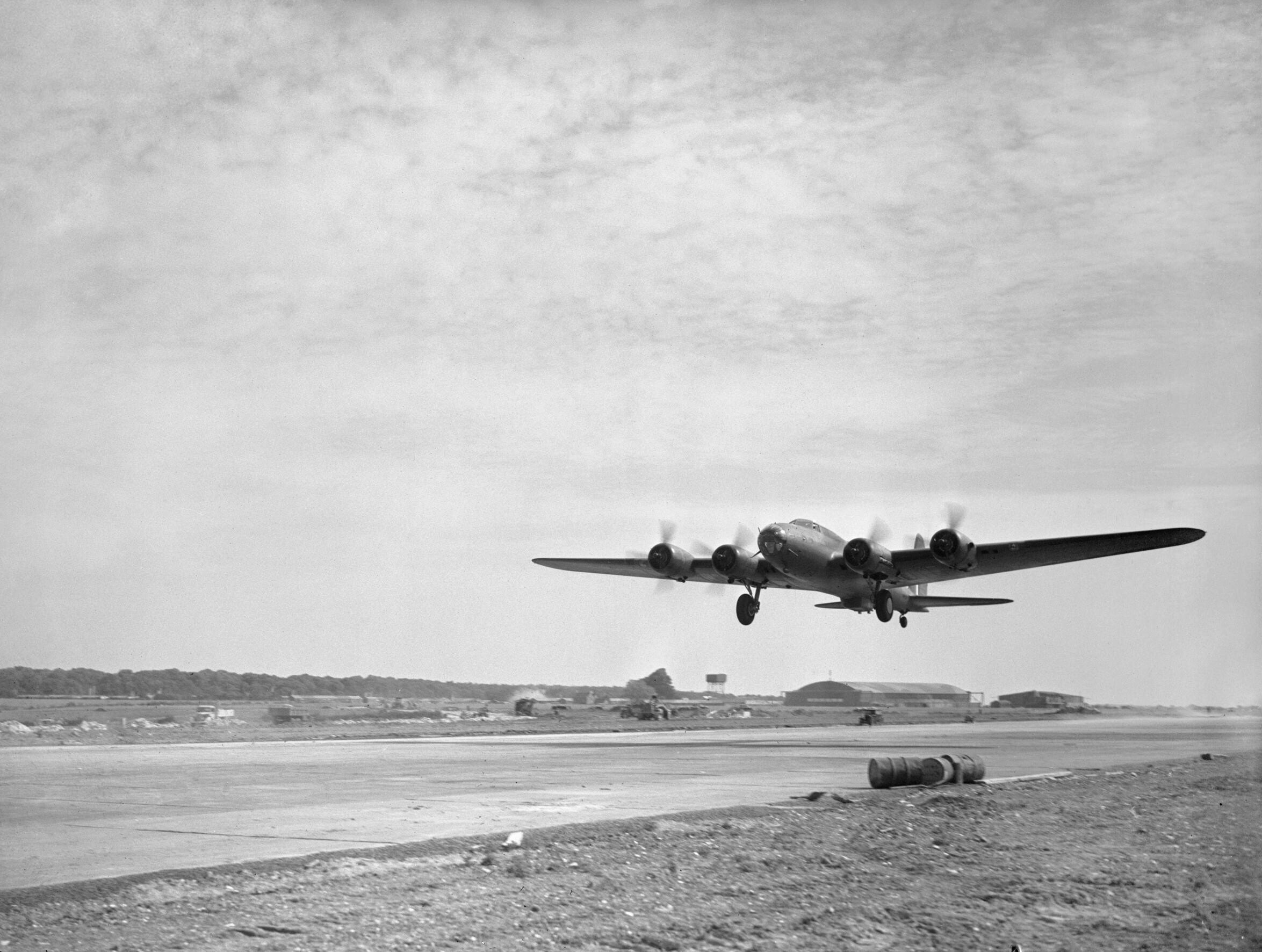
A British Boeing Fortress Mark I from No. 90 Squadron RAF taking off for the 24 July raid

Facing increasing losses during the Battle of the Atlantic, Winston Churchill ordered that Bomber Command temporarily halt its campaign against German industry and focus on the Focke-Wulf Fw 200 Condor threat and the U-boat ports and production instead. As soon as Scharnhorst and Gneisenau arrived in Brest, they were added as top priorities on the target list. Between 30 March and 7 July nineteen major raids took place on Brest. The Germans reacted by installing smoke generators which obscured the harbour with good effect. Scharnhorst was not hit, but in the night of 4 April a dud bomb close to Gneisenau forced her to leave dock, and next day the battleship was torpedoed by a Coastal Command Bristol Beaufort in her exposed position in the harbour. (Note: The aircraft was shot down by the extensive anti-aircraft guns and the pilot Kenneth Campbell was posthumously awarded the Victoria Cross.) When Gneisenau was moved back in her dock, she was hit by four bombs in the night of 10 April. These second hits on Gneisenau raised the first doubts, for German naval planners, over the viability of Brest as a base for German capital ships. Prinz Eugen was seriously damaged by a bomb on 1 July. On 9 July the campaign by Bomber Command was halted as the tides had shifted in the battle of the Atlantic, and because of Operation Barbarossa, Bomber Command wanted to resume the campaign against German industry.

After repairs were completed in July, Scharnhorst went to La Pallice for trials on the 21st, where she easily steamed at 30 knots (56 km/h; 35 mph). She did not return to Brest to avoid an undesirable concentration of heavy units in one port (Prinz Eugen had arrived there on 21 July) but moored alongside at La Pallice on 23 July where she was immediately discovered by aerial reconnaissance. Since the British feared Scharnhorst was preparing for an Atlantic sortie, an immediate attack by six Short Stirling heavy bombers was ordered but the aircraft achieved nothing and one was shot down by German fighters. The RAF had planned a large daylight raid involving 150 bombers on the capital ships in Brest on 24 July, but the departure of Scharnhorst to La Pallice caused last-minute alterations to the operation: three Boeing Fortresses attacking from high level, with eighteen Handley Page Hampden mediums escorted by three squadrons of Spitfires would "draw up" draw up German fighters prematurely. As a diversion 36 Bristol Blenheim light bombers escorted by Spitfires attacked Cherbourg. The main bombing force of 79 Vickers Wellington medium bombers attacked Brest, with Prinz Eugen and Gneisenau as their principal targets. Fifteen Handley Page Halifax heavy bombers of No. 35 Squadron RAF and No. 76 Squadron RAF flew the extra 200 miles (320 km) to reach Scharnhorst attacking Scharnhorst at her moorings. They scored five hits in an almost straight line on the starboard side, parallel to the centerline. Three of the bombs were 1,000 lb (450 kg) armor-piercing bombs, and the other two were 500 lb (230 kg) high-explosive bombs. One of the 500 lb bombs hit the deck just forward of the starboard 15 cm twin turret next to the conning tower. It passed through the upper and middle decks before exploding on the main armored deck, which contained the blast. The joints with the torpedo bulkhead were weakened enough to cause leaking. The second 500 lb bomb fell forward of the rear main battery turret and penetrated the first two decks. It also exploded on the armored deck and tore a small hole in it. The explosion caused splinter damage and disabled the ammunition hoists for the 37 mm anti-aircraft guns.

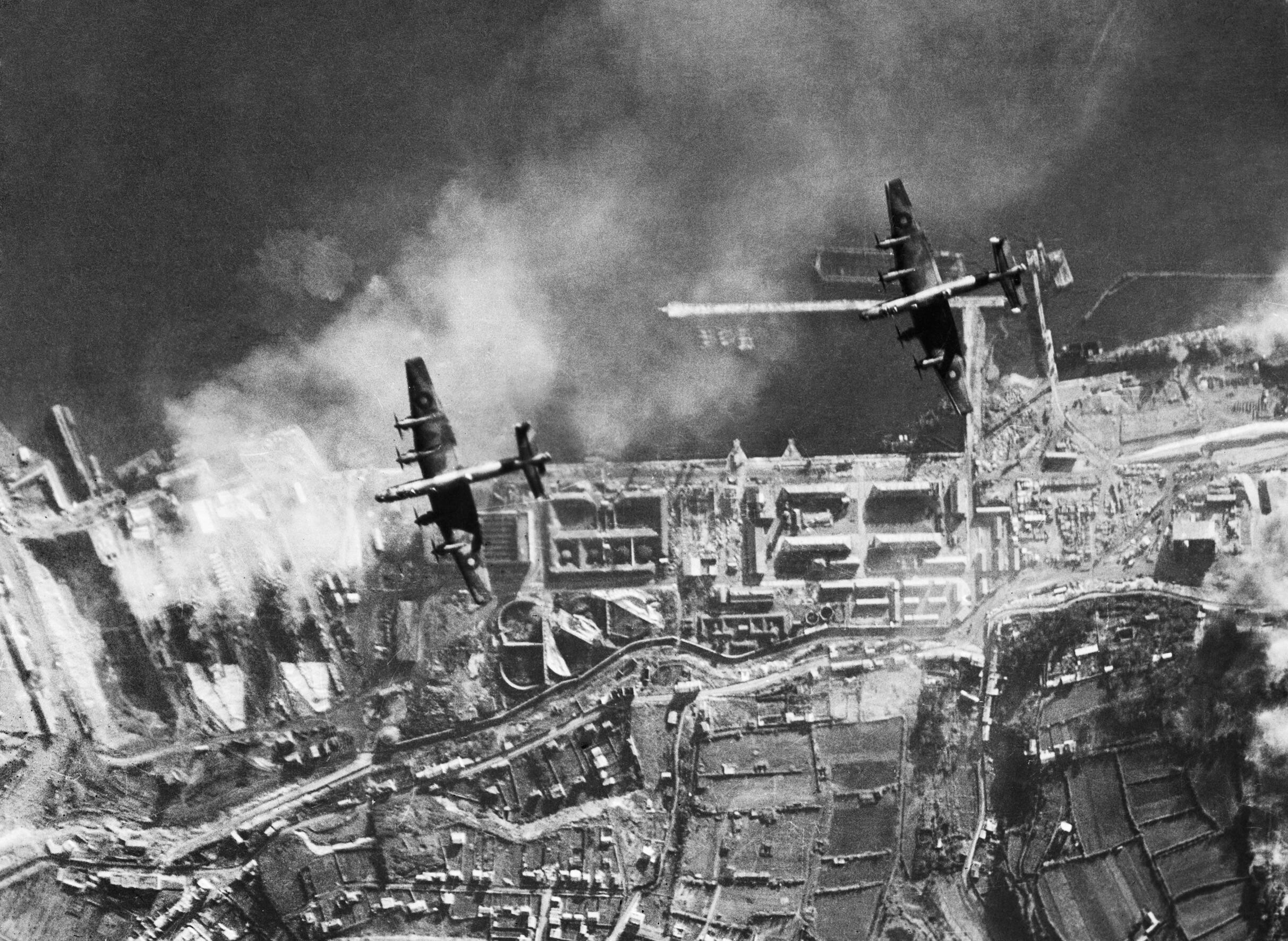
Two Halifax bombers attacking Scharnhorst and Gneisenau (side by side in the docks on the left) in December 1941; Prinz Eugen is moored at the quay at the extreme right

Two of the 1000 lb bombs hit amidships between the 15 cm and 10.5 cm gun turrets; both failed to explode and instead penetrated the ship completely. The first went through each deck and exited the ship through the double bottom, while the other was deflected by the torpedo bulkhead and penetrated the hull beneath the side belt armor. The 1000 lb bomb hit aft of the rear 28 cm turret, about 3 m (9.8 ft) from the side of the ship. It too failed to detonate, and passed through the side of the hull, which was not protected by the main armor belt. These three hits caused significant flooding and an 8 degree list to starboard. The forward and rear gun turrets (Anton and Caesar) were temporarily disabled, along with half of her anti-aircraft battery. Two men were killed and fifteen were injured in the attack. Damage-control teams managed to correct the list with counter-flooding, and although draft increased by 1 m (3.3 ft), Scharnhorst was able to leave for Brest at 19:30. On the morning of 25 July, one of the escorting destroyers shot down a British patrol plane. The ship reached Brest later that day and went into dry dock for repairs, which took four months. While the damage was being repaired, a new radar system was installed aft, the power output for the forward radar was increased to 100 kW, and the 53.3 cm torpedo tubes were installed.

The strategic position following the damage to Scharnhorst was serious. Gneisenau and Prinz Eugen were still being repaired, Bismarck had been sunk on 27 May. All German capital ships deployed to the Atlantic were therefore out of action. In addition, Tirpitz was still working up and not ready for service; Lützow had been seriously damaged by a torpedo on 13 June 1941; Admiral Scheer and Admiral Hipper were in dockyards for maintenance.

On 10 November Bomber Command was forced to pause its campaign against German industry because of high losses and lack of success. As a result, the attacks against the ships in Brest resumed. Between 19 August and 11 February 36 attacks were mounted, most of these were surprise attacks by small groups of aircraft that tried to arrive before the smoke screen was generated. On 7 December the first attempt was made with Oboe for blind bombing through the smoke screen. Only on 6 January there was a small success with a light hit on Gneisenau, but the other ships were not hit.

=== Operation Cerberus ===
On 12 January 1942, the German Naval Command, in a conference with Hitler, made the decision to return Scharnhorst, Gneisenau, and the heavy cruiser Prinz Eugen to Germany. The intention was to remove the ships from harm's way and deploy the vessels to Norway to interdict Allied convoys to the Soviet Union. The so-called "Channel Dash", codenamed Operation Cerberus, would avoid the increasingly effective Allied radar and patrol aircraft in the Atlantic. Vice Admiral Otto Ciliax, Scharnhorst's first commander, was given command of the operation. In early February, minesweepers swept a route through the English Channel undetected by the British.

At 23:00 on 11 February, Scharnhorst, Gneisenau, and Prinz Eugen left Brest. They entered the Channel an hour later; the three ships sped at 27 knots (50 km/h; 31 mph), hugging the French coast along the voyage. The British failed to detect their departure, as the submarine that had been tasked with observing the port had withdrawn to recharge its batteries. The German movements went undetected by the airborne radar patrols. By 06:30, they had passed Cherbourg, at which point they were joined by a flotilla of torpedo boats. The torpedo boats were led by Kapitän Erich Bey, aboard the destroyer Z29. General der Jagdflieger (General of Fighter Force) Adolf Galland directed Luftwaffe fighter and bomber forces (Operation Donnerkeil) during Cerberus. The fighters flew at masthead-height to avoid detection by the British radar network. Liaison officers were present on all three ships. By 13:00, the ships had cleared the Strait of Dover; half an hour later, a flight of six Swordfish torpedo bombers, with Spitfire fighter escort, attacked the Germans. The British failed to penetrate the Luftwaffe fighter shield, and all six Swordfish were destroyed.

Scharnhorst did not make the voyage unscathed, however; at 15:31 she struck an air-dropped magnetic mine in the mouth of the Scheldt, abreast of the forward superfiring turret (Bruno). The blast damaged the ship's circuit breakers and knocked out her electrical system for 20 minutes. The explosive shock caused serious damage; turret Bruno was jammed, as were the twin and single 15 cm mounts on the port side. The blast also damaged the fuel oil pumps and the bearings in the turbo-generators, which brought the ship to a halt. The power outage disabled the emergency shut-off switches to the boilers and turbines, which could not be turned off until power was restored. The explosion tore a large gash in the side of the hull and allowed 1,220 t (1,200 long tons; 1,340 short tons) of water into the ship, flooding 30 watertight spaces within five main watertight compartments. Scharnhorst took on a list of one degree and was down by the bows by a meter.

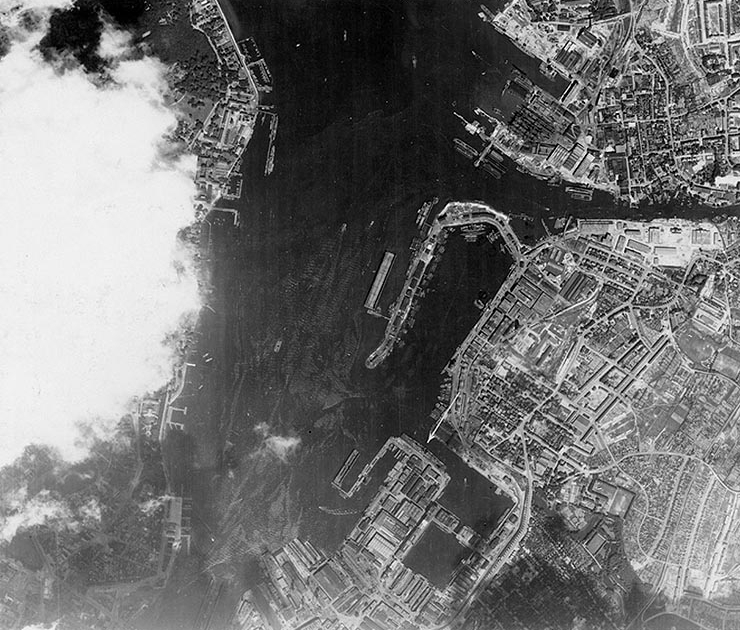
Aerial reconnaissance photo of Scharnhorst in Kiel after the Channel Dash in February 1942

While the ship was immobilized, Admiral Ciliax transferred to Z29. The engine room crews managed to restart the first turbine at 15:49, nearly twenty minutes after the mine explosion. The second and third turbines were restarted at 15:55 and 16:01, respectively, which permitted a speed of 27 knots (50 km/h; 31 mph). At around the time the last turbine was restarted, a single bomber dropped several bombs approximately 90 m (98 yd) off Scharnhorst's port side, which caused no damage. Once the ship was back under way, twelve Beauforts launched a 10-minute attack that was beaten off by anti-aircraft fire and the escorting Luftwaffe fighters. The British carried out a series of attacks that were all unsuccessful; Scharnhorst's anti-aircraft guns were red-hot by the end of the action, and one 20 mm gun had burst from the strain.

The ship struck another mine off Terschelling on the starboard side at 22:34. The mine briefly knocked out the power system and temporarily disabled the rudders. Two of the three turbines were jammed, and the third had to be turned off. Another 300 t (300 long tons; 330 short tons) tons of water flooded ten watertight spaces in four main compartments. Only the centerline shaft was operational, which permitted a speed of only 10 knots (19 km/h; 12 mph). Partial power was eventually restored to the starboard turbine, which allowed speed to be increased to 14 knots (26 km/h; 16 mph). The shock damaged the rotating parts of all of the ship's gun turrets, and three of the 15 cm turrets were seriously jammed. By 08:00, Scharnhorst had reached the Jade Bight but ice prevented the ship from entering Wilhelmshaven. While waiting outside the port, Admiral Ciliax returned to the ship. The ice had been cleared by noon, permitting Scharnhorst's entrance to Wilhelmshaven. Two days later, Scharnhorst went to Kiel for permanent repairs. Work was conducted in a floating dry dock and lasted until July 1942. Afterward, another round of trials were conducted in the Baltic, which revealed the necessity of replacing several of the boiler tubes.

=== Deployment to Norway ===
In early August 1942, Scharnhorst conducted exercises in cooperation with several U-boats. During the maneuvers, she collided with the German submarine U-523, which caused damage that necessitated dry-docking for repairs. Work was completed by September, and the ship conducted further training in the Baltic. Scharnhorst steamed to Gotenhafen in late October for a new rudder, the design of which was based on the lessons learned from the torpedoing of Prinz Eugen and Lützow earlier in the year. Boiler and turbine troubles kept the ship in Germany for the remainder of 1942. By December, only two of the three shafts were operational and a complete overhaul of the propulsion system was required. In early January 1943, the ship was back in service, and after trials, left Germany on 7 January in company with Prinz Eugen and five destroyers. Reports of heavy activity in British airfields near the coast prompted the force to return to port, however. Another attempt to reach Norway was canceled under similar circumstances. On 8 March, however, poor weather grounded the British bombers, and so Scharnhorst and four destroyers were able to make the journey to Norway. A severe storm off Bergen forced the destroyers to seek shelter but Scharnhorst was able to continue on at the reduced speed of 17 knots (31 km/h; 20 mph). At 16:00 on 14 March, Scharnhorst dropped anchor in Bogen Bay outside Narvik. There she met Lützow and the battleship Tirpitz. The reinforcement of the German fleet in Norway with the arrival of the Scharnhorst forced the British to suspend the Arctic convoys during the summer of 1943.

On 22 March, Scharnhorst, Tirpitz, and Lützow steamed to Altafjord for repairs to damage incurred in heavy storms. In early April, Scharnhorst, Tirpitz, and nine destroyers conducted a training mission to Bear Island in the Arctic Ocean. On the 8th, a serious internal explosion occurred in the after auxiliary machinery space above the armor deck. The explosion killed or injured 34 men and prompted the crew to flood the magazines for turret Caesar as a precaution against a magazine explosion. A repair ship completed work on the vessel in two weeks. Fuel shortages prevented major operations for the next six months, during which Scharnhorst was able to conduct only short training maneuvers.

Scharnhorst, Tirpitz, and nine destroyers embarked from Altafjord on an offensive on 6 September known as Operation Zitronella; the ships were tasked with bombarding the island of Spitzbergen. During the operation, Scharnhorst destroyed a battery of two 76 mm (3.0 in) guns and shelled fuel tanks, coal mines, harbour facilities, and military installations. Of particular importance was the weather station that was transmitting weather information to the Allies, which was used to schedule convoys to the Soviet Union. The destroyers landed some 1,000 troops, which pushed the Norwegian garrison into the mountains, completing the mission without major loss. On 22 September, the British executed Operation Source, an attack by six X-craft midget submarines on the German fleet in Norway at their moorings. The X-craft were to drop ground mines below the hull of the German ships. Of the two X-craft that were assigned to attack Scharnhorst, one was lost on its way to Norway and the other suffered mechanical problems and had to abort the attack. But even if the X-craft had managed to reach the moorings of Scharnhorst, the attack would have failed since Scharnhorst had left for a training cruise. Other X-craft attacked and seriously damaged Tirpitz. This reduced the Arctic Task Force to Scharnhorst and her five escorting destroyers, since Lützow left for Germany with five destroyers on 23 September.

On 25 November 1943 Scharnhorst carried out a two-hour full-power trial achieving 29.6 knots (54.8 km/h; 34.1 mph) and it was noted that her draught had increased by over 0.5 metres (1.6 ft) from her 1940 trials where she had attained 31.14 knots (57.67 km/h; 35.84 mph).

=== Battle of the North Cape ===
With the rapidly deteriorating military situation for the German Army on the Eastern Front, it became increasingly important to interrupt the flow of supplies from the Western Allies to the Soviet Union. By December 1943, the German Army was forced into continuous retreat. The Luftwaffe had been seriously weakened by four long years of war, and increasing Allied anti-submarine capabilities were steadily degrading the effectiveness of the U-boats. The only effective weapon at the disposal of the Germans in Norway was Scharnhorst; Tirpitz had been badly damaged, and the four remaining heavy cruisers were committed to the Baltic. During a conference with Hitler on 19–20 December, Großadmiral Karl Dönitz decided to employ Scharnhorst against the next Allied convoy that presented itself. Erich Bey, by now promoted to Konteradmiral, was given command of the task force.

On 22 December Dönitz ordered Bey to be ready to go to sea on a three-hour notice. Later that day, reconnaissance aircraft located a convoy of some 20 transports escorted by cruisers and destroyers approximately 400 nautical miles (740 kilometres; 460 miles) west of Tromsø. The convoy was spotted again two days later, and it was determined that the course was definitively toward the Soviet Union. A U-boat reported the convoy's location at 09:00 on 25 December, and Dönitz ordered Scharnhorst into action. In his instructions to Bey, Dönitz advised him to break off the engagement if presented with superior forces, but to remain aggressive. Bey planned to attack the convoy at 10:00 on 26 December if the conditions were favorable for the attack. At this time of year, there was only 45 minutes of full daylight and six hours of twilight, which significantly limited Bey's operational freedom. The Germans were concerned with developments in Allied radar-directed fire control, which allowed British battleships to fire with great accuracy in the darkness; German radar capabilities lagged behind those of their opponents.

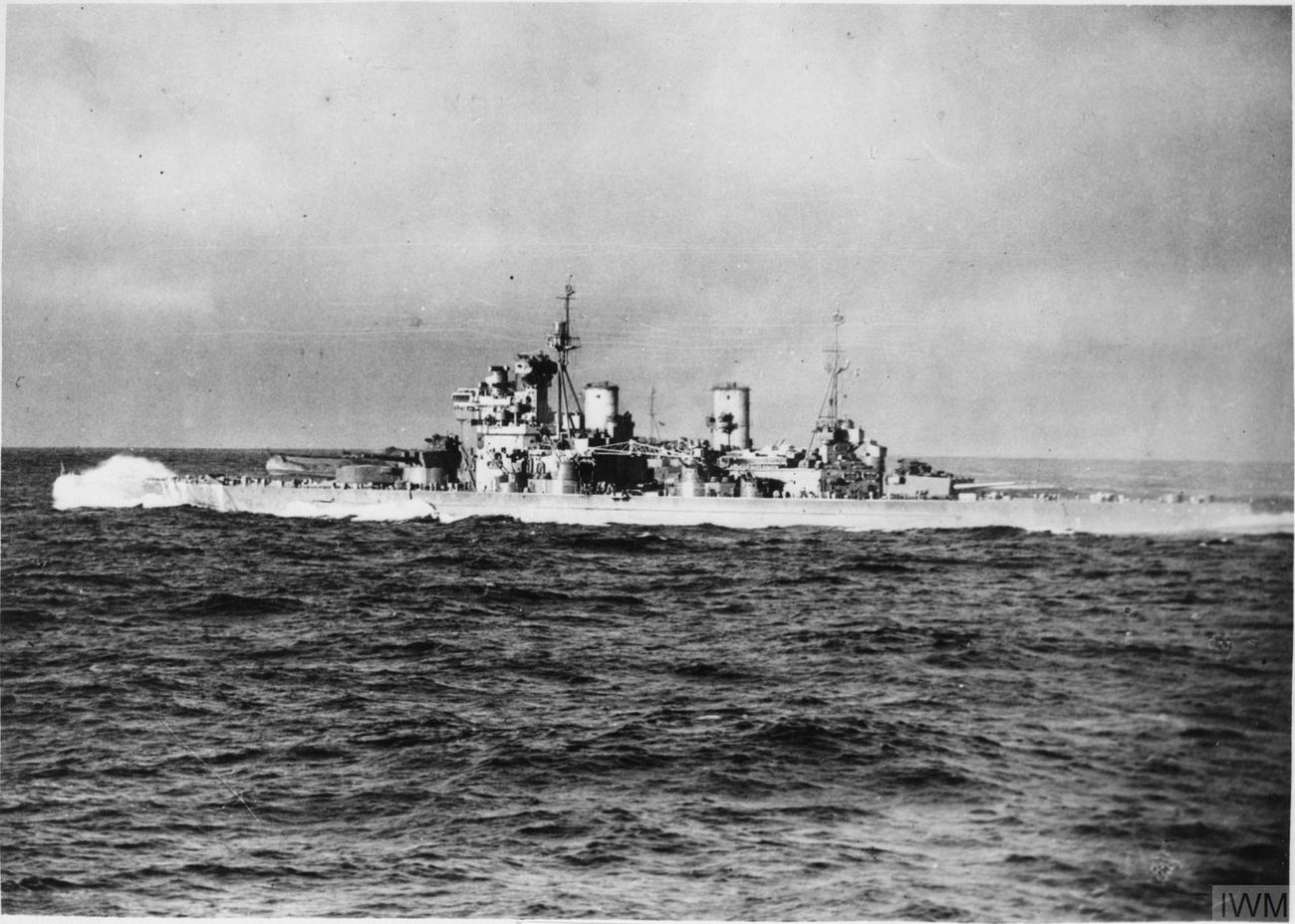
HMS Duke of York in the Arctic escorting a convoy

Scharnhorst and her five destroyers left port at around 19:00 and were in the open sea four hours later. At 03:19, Bey received instructions from the Fleet Command that Scharnhorst was to conduct the attack alone if heavy seas interfered with the destroyers' ability to fight. Unbeknown to the Germans, the British were able to read the ciphered Enigma radio transmissions between Scharnhorst and the Fleet Command; Admirals Robert Burnett and Bruce Fraser were aware of Bey's plan for the attack on the convoy and could position their forces accordingly. At 07:03, Scharnhorst was some 40 nautical miles (74 kilometres; 46 miles) southwest of Bear Island when she made a turn that would put her in position to attack the convoy at 10:00. Admiral Burnett, commanding the three cruisers escorting Convoy JW 55B, Norfolk, Belfast, and Sheffield, placed his ships between the convoy and Scharnhorst's expected direction of attack. Fraser in the battleship Duke of York, along with the cruiser Jamaica and four destroyers, moved to a position southwest of Scharnhorst to block a possible escape attempt.

An hour after making the turn, Bey deployed his destroyers in a line screening Scharnhorst, which remained 10 nmi (19 km; 12 mi) behind. Half an hour later, Scharnhorst's loudspeakers called the crew to battle stations in preparation for the attack. At 08:40, Belfast picked up Scharnhorst on her radar. Unaware that they had been detected, the Germans had turned off their radar to prevent the British from picking up on the signals. At 09:21, Belfast's lookouts spotted Scharnhorst at a range of 11,000 m (12,000 yd). The cruiser opened fire three minutes later, followed by Norfolk two minutes after. Scharnhorst fired a salvo from turret Caesar before turning and increasing speed to disengage from the cruisers. The battleship was hit twice by 20.3 cm (8 in) shells; the first failed to explode and caused negligible damage, but the second struck the forward rangefinders and destroyed the radar antenna. The aft radar, which possessed only a limited forward arc, was the ship's only remaining radar capability.

Scharnhorst turned south and attempted to work around the cruisers, but the superior British radar prevented Bey from successfully carrying out the maneuver. By 12:00, Scharnhorst was to the northeast of the convoy, but Belfast had reestablished radar contact; it took the cruisers twenty minutes to close the range and begin firing. Scharnhorst detected the cruisers with her aft radar and opened fire with her main battery guns before turning away to disengage a second time. Shortly before 12:25, Scharnhorst hit Norfolk twice with 28 cm shells. The first shell hit the forward superstructure and disabled Norfolk's gunnery radar. The second 28 cm round struck the ship's "X" (rear superfiring) barbette and disabled the turret. Scharnhorst then turned again and increased speed, in the hopes of escaping the cruisers and finding the convoy. Burnett chose to keep his distance and shadow Scharnhorst with radar while Fraser made his way to the scene in Duke of York. Meanwhile, the five German destroyers continued searching for the convoy without success. At 13:15, Bey decided to return to base, and at 13:43, he dismissed the destroyers and instructed them to return to port.

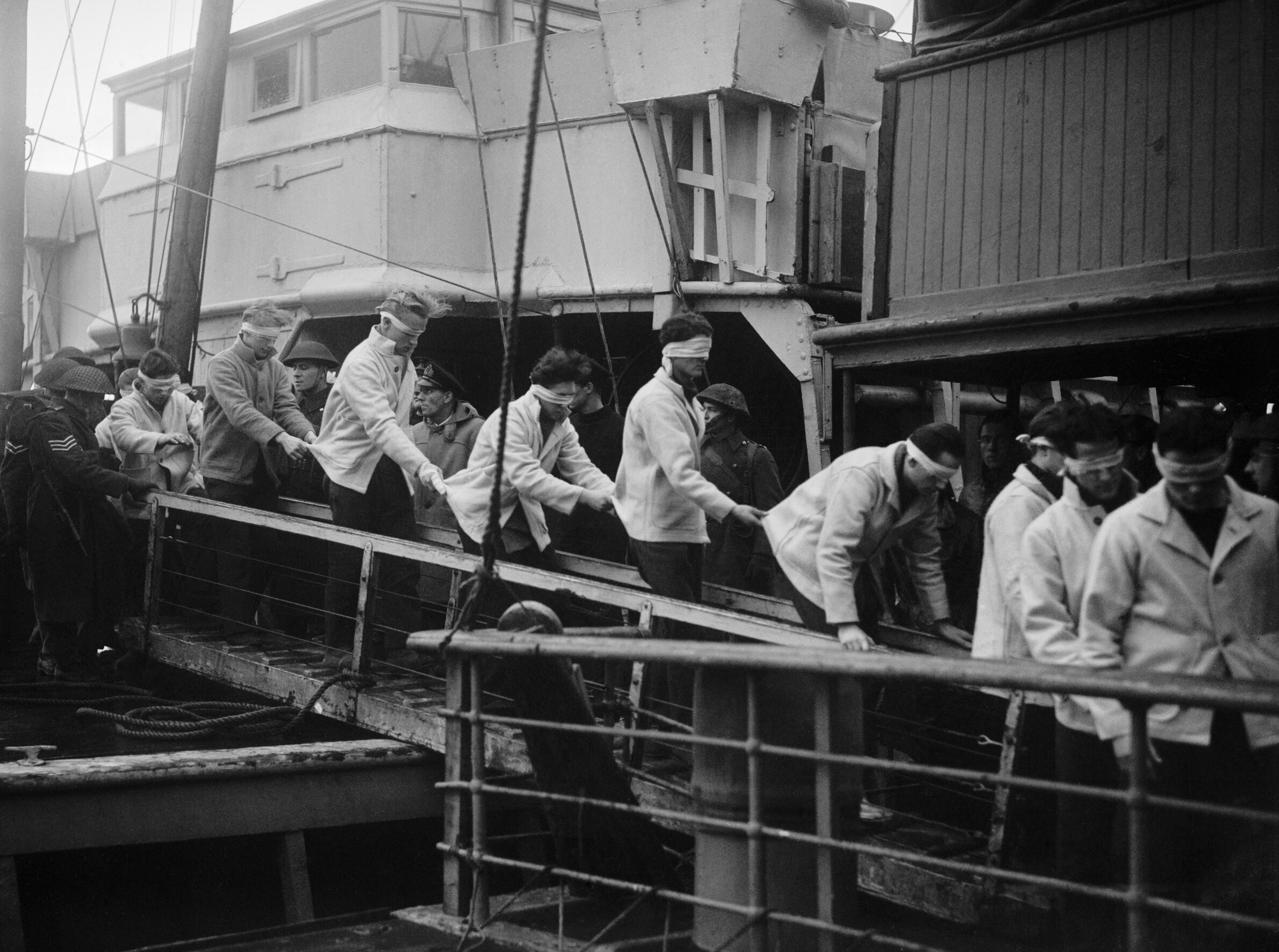
Survivors from Scharnhorst disembarking in Scapa Flow, Orkney

At 16:17, Duke of York made radar contact with Scharnhorst; thirty minutes later, Belfast illuminated the German battleship with star shells. At 16:50, Duke of York opened fire at a range of 11,000 m (12,000 yd); Scharnhorst quickly returned the fire. Five minutes after opening fire, one of Duke of York's 14 in (35.6 cm) shells struck Scharnhorst abreast of her forward (Anton) gun turret. The shell hit jammed the turret's training gears, putting it out of action. Shell splinters started a fire in the ammunition magazine, which forced the Germans to flood both forward magazines to prevent an explosion. The water was quickly drained from turret Bruno's magazine. The ship was now fighting with only two-thirds of her main battery. Shortly thereafter, another 14 in shell struck the ventilation trunk attached to Bruno, which caused the turret to be flooded with noxious propellant gases every time the breeches were opened. A third shell hit the deck next to turret Caesar and caused some flooding; shell splinters caused significant casualties. At 17:30, shells struck the forward 15 cm gun turrets and destroyed them both.

At around 18:00, another 14 inch shell struck the ship on the starboard side, passed through the thin upper belt armor, and exploded in the number 1 boiler room. It caused significant damage to the ship's propulsion system and slowed the ship to 8 knots (15 km/h; 9.2 mph). Temporary repairs allowed Scharnhorst to return to 22 knots (41 km/h; 25 mph). She managed to add 5,000 m (5,500 yd) to the distance between her and Duke of York, while straddling the ship with several salvos. Shell splinters rained on Duke of York and disabled the fire-control radar.

"Gentlemen, the battle against the Scharnhorst has ended in victory for us. I hope that any of you who are ever called upon to lead a ship into action against an opponent many times superior, will command your ship as gallantly as the Scharnhorst was commanded today."

— Admiral Bruce Fraser

At 18:42, Duke of York ceased fire, having fired 52 salvos and having scored at least 13 hits, but Scharnhorst was pulling away. Many of these hits had badly damaged the ship's secondary armament, which left her open to destroyer attacks, which Fraser ordered. The destroyers Scorpion and HNoMS Stord launched a total of eight torpedoes at 18:50, four of which hit. One torpedo exploded abreast of turret Bruno, which caused it to jam. The second torpedo hit the ship on the port side and caused some minor flooding, and the third struck toward the rear of the ship and damaged the port propeller shaft. The fourth hit the ship in the bow. The torpedoes slowed Scharnhorst to 12 knots (22 km/h; 14 mph), which allowed Duke of York to close to 9,100 m (10,000 yd). With only turret Caesar operational, all available men were sent to retrieve ammunition from the forward turrets to keep the last heavy guns supplied. Fraser then ordered Jamaica and Belfast to move into range and finish the crippled ship off with torpedoes. After several more torpedo hits, Scharnhorst settled further into the water and began to list to starboard. At 19:45, the ship went down by the bow, with her propellers still slowly turning. British ships began searching for survivors, but were soon ordered away after just a few were pulled out of the water even though voices could still be heard calling for help from the darkness. Of the crew of 1,968 officers and enlisted men, only 36 men survived.

== Wreck discovery ==
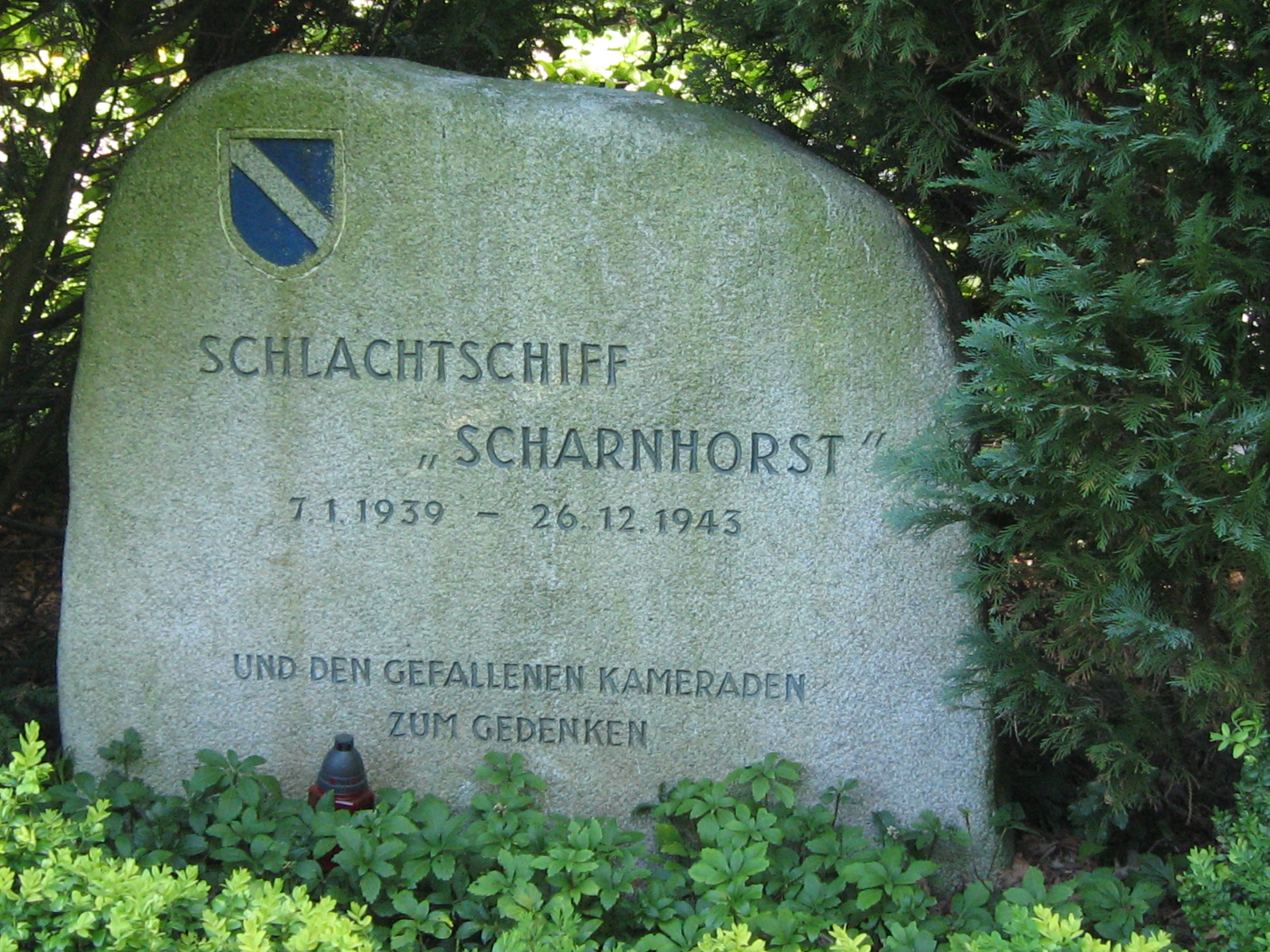
Memorial for Scharnhorst's crew, at Ehrenfriedhof in Wilhelmshaven

In September 2000, a joint expedition to find the sunken battleship conducted by the BBC, NRK, and the Royal Norwegian Navy began. The underwater survey vessel Sverdrup II, operated by the Norwegian Defence Research Establishment, was used to scan the sea floor. After locating a large submerged object, the research team then used the Royal Norwegian Navy's underwater recovery vessel HNoMS Tyr to examine the object visually. The wreck was positively identified by an ROV on 10 September, which located armament consistent with that of Scharnhorst. The ship sank in approximately 290 m (950 ft) of water. The hull lies upside down on the seabed, with debris, including the main mast and rangefinders, scattered around the wreck. Extensive damage from shellfire and torpedoes is evident; the bow was blown off, presumably from a magazine explosion in the forward turrets, and lies in a tangled mass of steel some distance from the rest of the hull.
