= National Fortifications Heritage =

Division with the Norwegian Defence Estates Agency

- Nasjonale festningsverk
- Established: 1992
- Type: Heritage fortifications
- Collections: 16 sites
- Owner: Norwegian Defence Estates Agency
- Website: forsvarsbygg.no/festningene/

The National Fortifications Heritage (Norwegian: Nasjonale festningsverk) is a division with the Norwegian Defence Estates Agency responsible for sixteen military fortifications in Norway designated as heritage sites. The agency is responsible for conserving the character and history of the sites, while facilitating their use for culture, business and experiences. The list consists of ten fortresses, four smaller forts and two networks of border fortifications. Three fortresses, Akershus, Bergenshus and Vardøhus, date from the Middle Ages. Five installations date from the union with Denmark and five were built either union with Sweden or following the dissolution, as a defense against a Swedish invasion. Three forts, Austrått, Møvik and Trondenes, were built by the German Wehrmacht during World War II as part of Festung Norwegen.

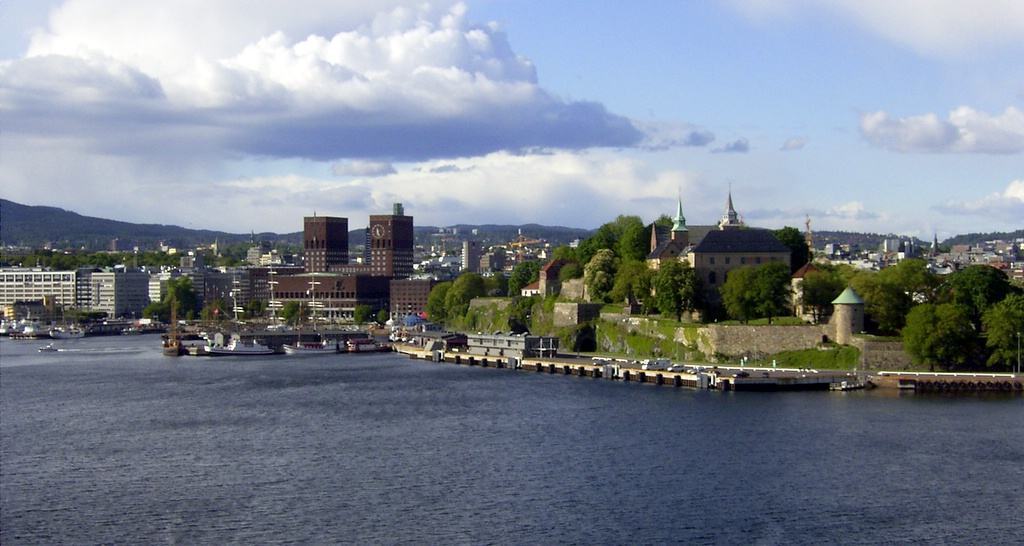
Akershus Fortress, located centrally in Oslo, houses among other institutions the Ministry of Defence and the Royal Mausoleum

Three of the fortifications, Akershus, Bergenshus and Karljohansvern, continue to be in regular use by the military; Akershus features the Ministry of Defence and the headquarters of the Norwegian Armed Forces. The agency has carried out work to improve public access and cultural use of the venues. Most of the facilities represent recreational areas for locals and museums have been established at most of the facilities. Oscarsborg has received an opera stage, while Kongsvinger has been partially converted to conference center. The fortifications had a combined two million visitors in 2008. Some of the installations are frequently used for concerts and other cultural events. Costs of maintenance is split between rental income from events and tenants, and government grants.

A government report in 1992 proposed that fourteen selected fortresses be made more accessible to the public, and in part be made tourist attractions, through a military and civilian cooperation. Responsibility for the sites was transferred to the National Fortifications Heritage, when it was established as a division within the Norwegian Defence Estates Agency. The same year the ministry proposed that disused installations from the Cold War also be added to the list. A conservation plan for each fortification was created the following year.

== Fortifications ==
Fortifications
Fortification	Image	Location	Description
Akershus Fortress		City of Oslo; 59°54′23″N 10°44′10″E	Construction of the castle started in the 1290s. Renovations commenced in the late 19th century, with focus on recreating a medieval design. New buildings on the site were constructed in Romanticism and castle style. It is the site of the Ministry of Defence and is the headquarters of the Norwegian Armed Forces, as well as hosting the Armed Forces Museum, Norway's Resistance Museum and the Royal Mausoleum. It acts as the government's main venue for state receptions.
Austrått Fort		Ørland Municipality; 63°42′30″N 9°43′19″E	Austrått Fort was constructed in 1942 by the German Wehrmacht to protect the Trondheimsfjord during the German occupation of Norway during World War II. The fort's centerpiece is a 28 cm SK C/34 naval gun from the German battleship Gneisenau, which was damaged in Kiel. The three-canon gun weighs 800 tonnes and was capable of firing 38 kilometers (24 mi). The last firing took place in 1953 and the fort was decommissioned in 1968. It opened as a museum in 1991.
Bergenhus Fortress		City of Bergen; 60°24′2″N 5°19′3″E	Construction of the fortress at Holmen started in the 12th century during the civil war era. A stone wall was built during the following century to protect the wooden town. Holmen became the political center of the country after Bergen became its capital. It remained a political center-point until 1660 and the introduction of the absolute monarchy. From then the fortress became a pure military installation and was expanded to the adjacent Sverresborg. The fortress was used by the Wehrmacht during World War II, but was severely damaged when a ship loaded with explosives blew up close by in 1944.
Border Fortifications		Innlandet and Østfold counties	The Border Fortifications consist of part of the Glomma Line, a network of border fortifications between the towns of Kongsvinger and Halden, close to the river Glomma. Twenty-two designated installations are part of the heritage list. The network was built during the 19th century, while Norway was in union with Sweden, as a signal of Norwegian autonomy. During the prelude to the union dissolution in 1905, the fortifications contributed to Swedish decision to not invade Norway. The Karlstad Treaty of 1905 stipulated that most of the installations had to be abandoned or demolished.
Fredrikstad Fortress		Town of Fredrikstad; 59°12′12″N 10°57′15″E	The star fort is one of three fortresses in Norway to have surrounded a town, and the only still remaining. Construction started in 1663, five years after Norway lost Bohus Fortress to Sweden. Fredrikstad Fortress became the most important fortress in Southern Norway and a rally point for the army. It has only been in combat once, in the 1814 Swedish-Norwegian War. The fortress was in use until 1903, after which it became a garrison, which was abandoned in 2002.
Fredriksten Fortress		Town of Halden; 59°7′10″N 11°23′48″E	Construction started in 1661, following the 1658 Treaty of Roskilde, in which Denmark–Norway ceded Bohus to Sweden. Thus Halden became located on the Norway–Sweden border. It remained an important installation until the creation of the Union between Sweden and Norway in 1814, after which its importance dwindled. It was decommissioned in 1905, following the dissolution of the union between Norway and Sweden.
Fredriksvern		Town of Stavern; 58°59′48″N 10°02′21″E	The decision to build the dockyards was taken by King Frederick V in 1750 and facilities were completed four years later. It became the main naval base and shipyard in Norway for the Royal Dano-Norwegian Navy. It became the headquarters of the Royal Norwegian Navy in 1814; the Naval Cadet Institute was moved to Karljohansvern in 1864, followed by the rest of the navy in 1894. The same year Fredriksvern became home to the Norwegian Military Academy. It later moved out and was replaced by the Anti-Aircraft Regiment, resulting in Fredriksvern having served all three main branches of the military.
Hegra Fortress		Stjørdal Municipality; 63°27′3″N 11°9′45″E	The fortress is built into bedrock and consists of 350 meters (1,150 ft) of tunnels, surrounded by three command towers and trenches. The fortification in the valley of Stjørdalen was built following the dissolution of the union between Norway and Sweden in 1905 and was completed in 1910. It was aimed at defending Norway from a Swedish invasion. Tensions fell and by the 1930s the fortress had fallen out of use. It became the site of the Battle of Hegra Fortress in April and May 1940, during the Norwegian Campaign of World War II, where 251 volunteers held off German attacks for 26 days. They were the last Norwegian forces to surrender in Southern Norway.
Karljohansvern		Town of Horten; 59°25′57″N 10°29′25″E	Karljohansvern hosts the National Museum of Photography and the Royal Norwegian Navy Museum—the oldest naval museum in the world.
Kongsvinger Fortress		Town of Kongsvinger; 59°25′37″N 10°29′08″E	The fortification's placement is tied to the valley providing easy passage between Norway and Sweden. The first part, a rectangular stone tower, was erected in 1673 and 1674. Upgrading to a fortress took place between 1681 and 1689. The fortress's highest military significant was during the Napoleonic War between 1808 and 1814, when it served proactively against a Swedish attack. Two new forts, Vardåsen and Gullbekkåsen, were constructed nearby during the tensions caused by the dissolution of the union between Norway and Sweden in 1905. Kongsvinger Fortress has never been under siege or been conquered.
Kristiansten Fortress		City of Trondheim; 63°25′36″N 10°24′40″E	The fortress was built following the 1681 Trondheim fire, which wiped out most of the city. The fortification was built on the hillside overlooking the town and was completed in 1684. It proactively caused Carl Gustaf Armfeldt to avoid attacking Trondheim in 1718. The fortress has thus never need active battle. It fell out of importance following the union between Sweden and Norway in 1814, and was abandoned two years later.
Møvik Fort		Kristiansand Municipality; 58°5′31″N 7°58′5″E	The coastal artillery fort consists of a 38 cm SK C/34 naval gun and was built by the Kriegsmarine between 1941 and 1944, during World War II. Along with a sister artillery at Hanstholm Fortress in Denmark, the two protected Skagerrak, thus hindering Allies from gaining access to the Baltic Sea. The cannon has a reach of 55 kilometers (34 mi) and is the only preserved of its class. The fort hosts Kristiansand Cannon Museum.
Oscarsborg Fortress		Frogn Municipality; 59°40′25″N 10°36′26″E	Located on the island of Kaholmane in the Oslofjord in the narrow Drøbak Sound, the fortress provides defense against naval attacks heading to Oslo. The first fortifications on the island was completed in 1643. Upgrading started during the 1830s; the first part was completed in 1848 and the fortress was completed in 1853. Because it could easily be attacked from land, Oscarsborg was upgraded in the 1890s. During the German invasion of Norway on 9 April 1940, Oscarsborg participated in the Battle of Drøbak Sound, where it sank the German cruiser Blücher.
Trondenes Fort		Town of Harstad	The coastal artillery was built by the Wehrmacht during World War II. It consisted of four 40.6 cm SK C/34 guns, of which one is preserved. Construction was carried out by Russian prisoners of war in 1943 and 1944. The cannon could fire 1,080-kilogram (2,380 lb) grenades and had a reach of 56 kilometers (35 mi) for the smaller 600-kilogram (1,300 lb) grenades.
Vardøhus Fortress		Town of Vardø; 70°22′20″N 31°05′41″E	Three fortifications have been built at Vardøhus. The first was built ca. 1300 to ensure that Norwegian tax income from Finnmark. A second fortification was built ca. 1450. There are no remains of the first two structures. The current fortress was built in 1738 and is designed as a star fort surrounding nine buildings. Vardøhus was the last stand to fly the Flag of Norway during the Norwegian Campaign and the first to fly it after the liberation of Finnmark.
Værdal Fortifications		Verdal Municipality	Following the dissolution of the union between Norway and Sweden in 1905, Norway was forced to abandon its border fortifications south of Kongsvinger and instead chose to move the armaments to Trøndelag. The fortifications were built between 1909 and 1911 and were designed to act as a first line of defense to allow the rest of the army to mobilize. It consists of two galleries, north and south, both built into bedrock overlooking each side of the valley of Verdalen and the river Inna. Each gallery is 90 meters (300 ft) long and features two cannon and five machine gun positions.
