= Festung Norwegen =

Fortress system in Norway

Festung Norwegen (transl. Fortress Norway) was the extensive defense and fortification system constructed in Norway, part of the Atlantic Wall, after the conquest and occupation of Norway by Nazi Germany in World War II. Some, including Reichskommissar Josef Terboven, thought that these fortifications would serve effectively as a last perimeter of defense of the Third Reich in the event of Allied victory on the continent. This led to German troops being diverted from mainland Europe, which resulted in a quicker end to the war.

== Atlantic Wall ==
Considered an essential part of the Atlantic Wall in anticipation of an Allied invasion, the fortifications in Norway were primarily based around coastal artillery, but also included anti-aircraft batteries, tanks and infantry forces. There were as many as 400,000 German troops in Norway during the occupation, a large proportion of whom were dedicated to the defense of this northern flank of the Atlantic Wall.

The scope of Festung Norwegen originally included the entire coastal perimeter of Norway, from the Oslofjord around the southern coast to the border with the Soviet Union. Part of the invasion plan for Norway included the immediate deployment of German coastal artillerymen in Norwegian batteries around the main cities of Horten, Kristiansand, Stavanger, Bergen, Trondheim, and Narvik.

== Coastal batteries ==
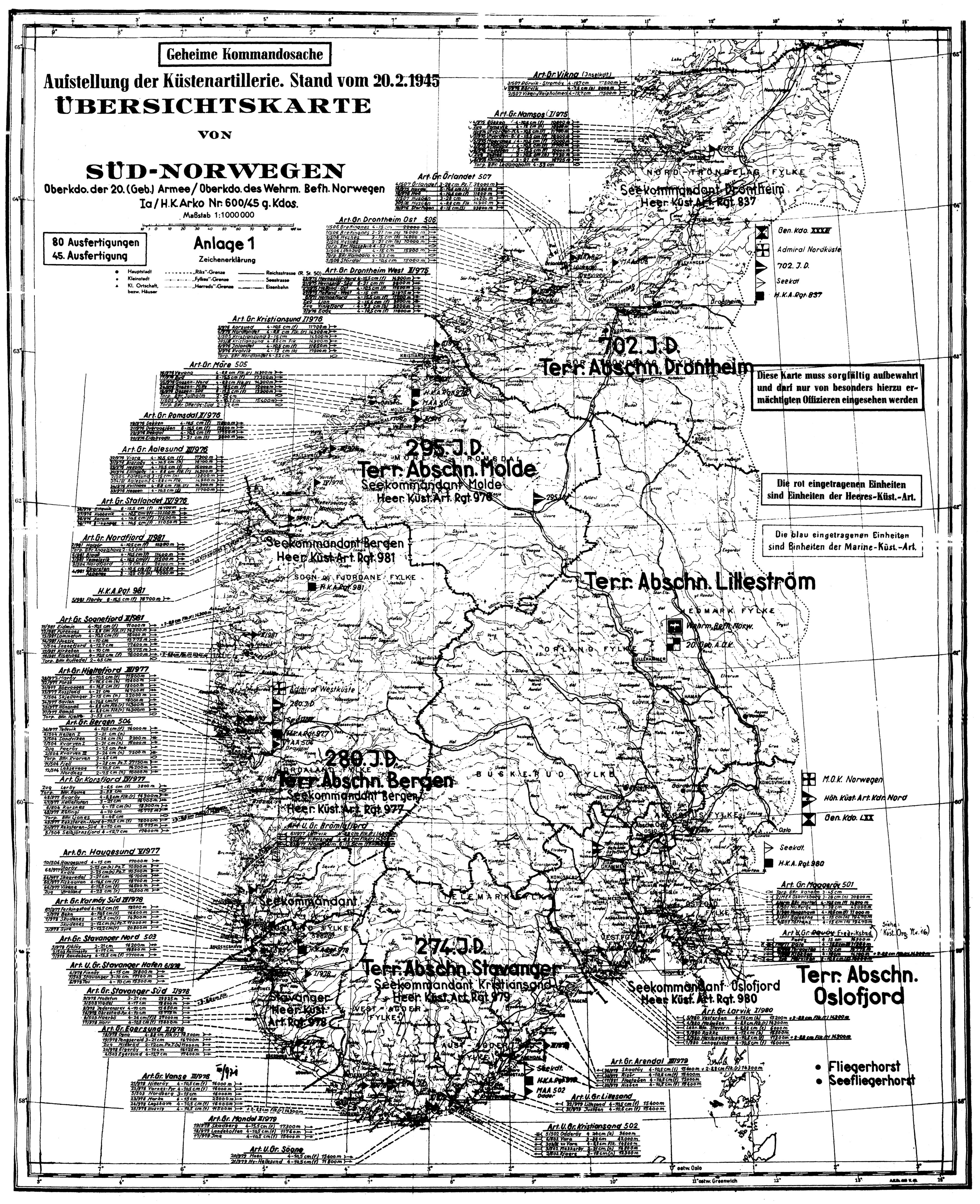
Positions of German coastal artillery in southern Norway (February 1945)

An extensive network of coastal artillery batteries with heavy (>15.5 cm), medium (12-15.5 cm) and light (<12 cm) ordnance was set up around the entire coast. These were typically placed so as to cover the approaches to main population centres and likely landing sites. The batteries were also generously equipped with close combat weapons, such as machine guns and small arms. By the end of the war, there were 221, 300 or over 300 batteries along the coast, under either Kriegsmarine or Heer command. There were also anti-aircraft artillery (Marine Flak) batteries in Kristiansand, Bergen, Trondheim, Bogen, and Harstad; these were armed with 88-mm pieces. The tanks available for the German defense were Panzer IIIs (50 mm L60 and 75 mm L24) and Sturmgeschütz IIIs (75 mm L48). Fjell fortress with its triple barrel 28 cm SK C/34 naval gun turret, taken from the battleship Gneisenau, was seen as one of the strongest fortresses in Northern Europe.

== Aftermath ==
The war ended without any of the fortifications being used in action. The fortress kept some German troops away from mainland Europe. The British Operation Fortitude North was designed to fool the Germans into thinking they intended to invade Norway in 1944, along with the Pas de Calais, so as to keep their troops away from the Normandy beaches.

== See also ==
- Alpine Fortress
- German World War II fortresses
- Nordstern (city)
