= Scharnhorst-class battleship =

Kriegsmarine battleship class

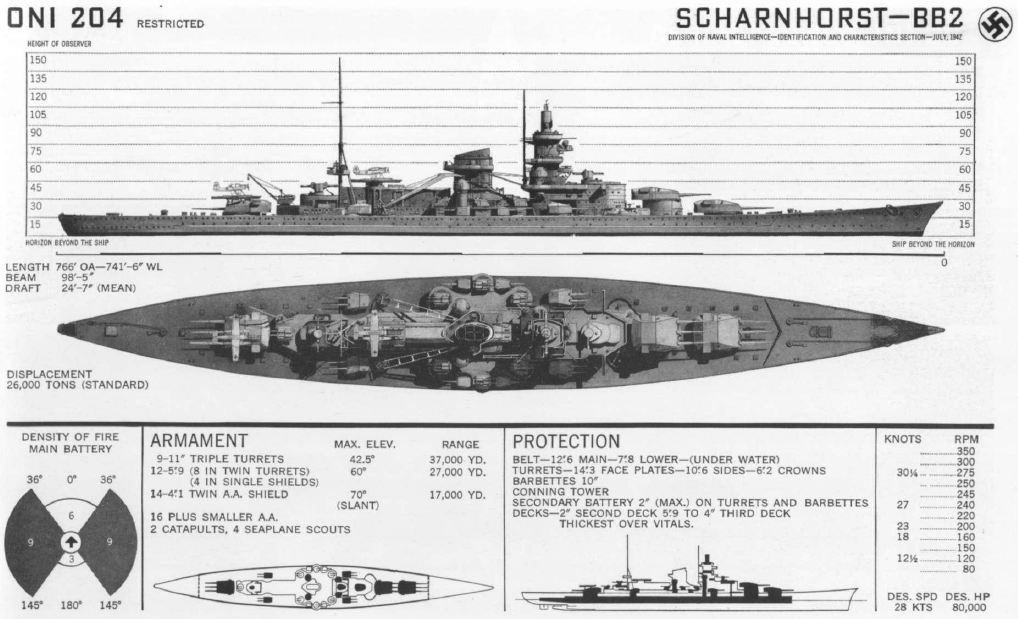
- Illustration of the Scharnhorst class

Class overview
- Builders: Deutsche Werke; Kriegsmarinewerft Wilhelmshaven
- Operators: Kriegsmarine
- Preceded by: L 20e α class (planned); Bayern class (actual)
- Succeeded by: Bismarck class
- Built: 1935–1939
- In service: 1938–1943
- Completed: 2
- Lost: 2
- Scrapped: 1

General characteristics
- Type: Fast battleship/Battlecruiser
- Displacement: Standard: 32,100 long tons (32,600 t); Full load: 38,100 long tons (38,700 t)
- Length: 235 m (771 ft) overall; 226 m (741 ft 6 in) waterline
- Beam: 30 m (98 ft 5 in)
- Draft: 9.69 m (31 ft 9 in) at 37,303 tons
- Installed power: 12 × water-tube boilers; 151,893 PS (149,815 ihp; 111,717 kW)
- Propulsion: 3 × steam turbines; 3 × screw propellers
- Speed: 31 knots (57 km/h; 36 mph)
- Range: Scharnhorst: 7,100 nmi (13,100 km; 8,200 mi) at 19 knots (35 km/h; 22 mph); Gneisenau: 6,200 nmi (11,500 km; 7,100 mi) at 19 knots
- Complement: 56 officers; 1613 enlisted
- Armament: 9 × 28 cm/54.5 (11 inch) SK C/34; 12 × 15 cm/55 (5.9") SK C/28; 14 × 10.5 cm/65 (4.1 inch) SK C/33; 16 × 3.7 cm/L83 (1.5") SK C/30; 10 (later 16) × 2 cm/65 (0.79") C/30 or C/38
- Armor: Belt: 320 mm (12.6 in); Deck: 50 to 95 mm (2.0 to 3.7 in); Turrets:200 to 360 mm (7.9 to 14.2 in); Conning tower: 350 mm
- Aircraft carried: 3 × Arado Ar 196A-3
- Aviation facilities: 1 × catapult

The Scharnhorst class was a class of German battleships (or battlecruisers) built immediately prior to World War II. The first capital ships of Nazi Germany's Kriegsmarine, it comprised two vessels, Scharnhorst and Gneisenau. Scharnhorst was launched first, and is considered to be the lead ship by some sources; they are also referred to as the Gneisenau class in some other sources, as Gneisenau was the first to be laid down and commissioned. They marked the beginning of German naval rearmament after the Treaty of Versailles. The ships were armed with nine 28 cm (11 in) SK C/34 guns in three triple turrets; plans to replace these with six 38 cm (15 in) SK C/34 guns in twin turrets were never realized.

The two ships were laid down in 1935, launched in late 1936, and commissioned into the German fleet by early 1939. Scharnhorst and Gneisenau operated together for the early years of World War II, including sorties into the Atlantic to raid British merchant shipping. The two ships participated in Operation Weserübung, the German invasion of Denmark and Norway. During operations off Norway, the two ships engaged the battlecruiser HMS Renown and sank the aircraft carrier HMS Glorious on 8 June 1940. In the engagement with Glorious, Scharnhorst achieved one of the longest-range naval gunfire hits in history. In early 1942, the two ships made a daylight dash up the English Channel from occupied France to Germany.

In late 1942, Gneisenau was heavily damaged in an Allied air raid against Kiel. In early 1943, Scharnhorst joined the Bismarck-class Tirpitz in Norway to interdict Allied convoys to the Soviet Union. Scharnhorst and several destroyers sortied from Norway to attack a convoy; the Germans were instead intercepted by British naval patrols. During the battle of North Cape, a force led by the Royal Navy battleship HMS Duke of York sank Scharnhorst. In the meantime, repair work on Gneisenau had begun, and the ship was in the process of being rearmed. When Scharnhorst was sunk, work on her sister was abandoned. Instead, she was sunk as a blockship in Gotenhafen in 1945; the wreck was broken up for scrap in the 1950s.

== Classification ==
They were the first class of German ships to be officially classified by the Kriegsmarine as Schlachtschiff (battleship). Previous German battleships were classified as Linienschiffe (ships of the line), (Note: Gröner, pp. 16–28. This book states the classification of each class of capital ship, and states that the Wittelsbach, Braunschweig, Deutschland, Nassau, Helgoland, Kaiser, König, and Bayern class ships were classified as Linienschiffe (ship of the line).) and Panzerschiffe (armored ship). (Note: Gröner, pp. 5–14. This book states that the Preussen class, Sachsen class, Oldenburg, Brandenburg class and Kaiser Friedrich III classes were classified as Panzerschiffe, and the Siegfried and Odin classes were classified as 4th rate Panzerschiffe. Contemporary British sources classified these Panzerschiffe as battleships and the 4th rate Panzerschiffe as coast defense ships. For example: the Naval Annual, 1888–89 p. 76 lists the Kronprinz, Friedrich Carl, König Wilhelm, Hansa, Preussen, Kaiser class, Sachsen, and Oldenburg classes as battleships. The Naval Annual, 1899 pp. 81–84 lists Brandenburg and Kaiser Friedrich III classes as 1st class battleships, the Sachsen, Oldenburg, and Kaiser classes as 3rd class battleships, and the Siegfried and Odin classes as coast defense ships.) Their adversary, the Royal Navy, rated them as battlecruisers but after the war reclassified them as battleships. Jane's Fighting Ships 1940 lists both the Scharnhorst and Bismarck classes as "Battleships (Schlachtschiffe)" Another adversary, the United States Navy, rated them as battleships. In English language reference works they are sometimes referred to as battleships and sometimes as battlecruisers. (Note: For example, Garzke & Dulin, p. 127, refers to the ships as battlecruisers, while Sturton, p. 43, calls them battleships.)

== Design ==
=== Development ===
The Treaty of Versailles, which established the terms concluding World War I, restricted German naval shipbuilding to warships displacing no more than 10,000 long tons (11,000 short tons). Debates in Germany over the role and size of its navy continued through the 1920s, when increased naval shipbuilding in France and the Soviet Union prompted the Germans to begin drawing up designs for large capital ships. The first design, completed in 1928, called for a 17,500 long tons (19,600 short tons) battlecruiser armed with eight 30.5 cm (12 in) guns in four twin gun turrets, based on the design for the Ersatz Yorck-class battlecruisers that had not been completed during the war. In 1933, Adolf Hitler came to power in Germany; he made clear to the naval command that he had no intention of building a large fleet to challenge British supremacy at sea. He was primarily concerned with the possibility of a limited war with France, which would require the protection of German sea lanes. To this end, he authorized two more ships—the D class—to augment the three Deutschland-class Panzerschiffe (armored ships). These ships would displace 19,000 tons and have the same armament and speed as the Panzerschiffe; the extra tonnage would be taken up by increased protection. Hitler wanted to follow this course so he would not be seen as overtly flouting the Treaty of Versailles. He did not realize that such "unsinkable" commerce raiders would provoke Great Britain more severely than 26,000-ton battlecruisers armed with 28.3 cm (11.1 inch) guns, which would be regarded as inferior to all the Royal Navy battleships and battlecruisers then in commission.

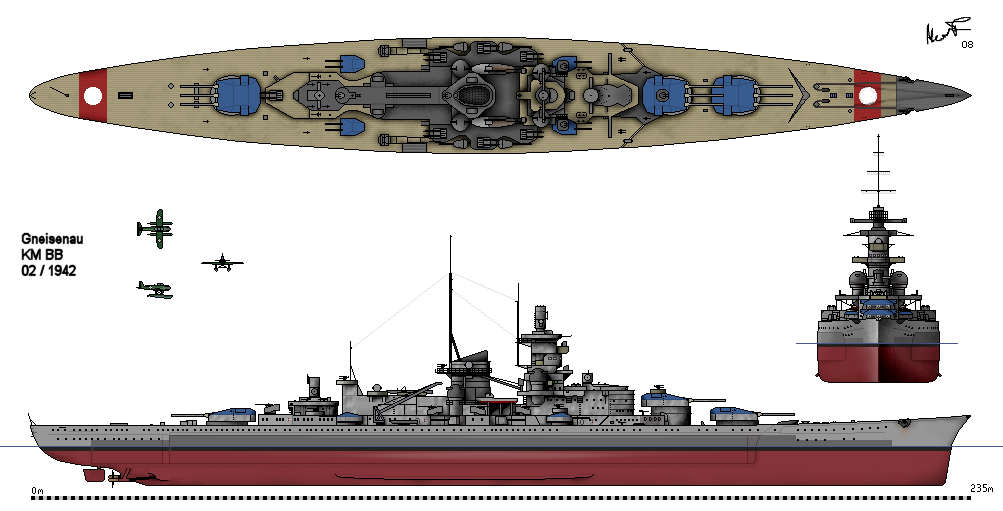
Gneisenau, depicted in her 1942 configuration

To combat the German Panzerschiffe, the French built two small Dunkerque-class battleships in the early 1930s. This in turn prompted the German navy to begin plans for a more powerful battlecruiser design. Since 1933, Erich Raeder, the head of the German Navy, had argued to increase the defensive qualities of the Panzerschiffe, and to increase the offensive power of the main battery with the addition of a third triple turret. This was also the view of the Kriegsmarine, which saw the 19,000-ton design as being unbalanced. Hitler agreed to increased armor protection and internal subdivision, but refused to permit an increase in armament. Finally, by February 1934, Hitler acquiesced over the addition of the third turret. The new ship would displace 26,000 long tons (29,000 short tons) and be armed with nine 28.3 cm guns in three triple turrets. To secure political freedom to build the new ships, Hitler concluded the 1935 Anglo-German Naval Agreement, which guaranteed Great Britain a 3 to 1 superiority in capital ships, and, more importantly, removed the limitations of the Treaty of Versailles for the German navy.

The construction of D-class cruisers were canceled to make way for Scharnhorst and Gneisenau. The provisional names of the planned D-class cruisers, Ersatz Elsass and Ersatz Hessen, were reallocated to the new ships, the contracts for which were awarded to the Kriegsmarinewerft Wilhelmshaven and the Deutsche Werke in Kiel. Construction was held up by 14 months, partly because Hitler wanted to secure the treaty with Britain before work began, and partly due to numerous design changes after the ships had been ordered.

Because the maximum caliber of naval gun allowed under the Anglo-German Naval Agreement was 40.6 cm (16 inch), Hitler soon had second thoughts about the guns to be used for the new ships and ordered that they be armed with 38 cm (15 inch) weapons. The 28.3 cm turrets were readily available; 38 cm turrets would take years to develop, and Hitler wanted capital ships as soon as possible to fulfill his political ideals. He was also reminded that, despite the allowances of the Anglo-German Naval Agreement, the British had historically been sensitive about increases in main gun calibers aboard German capital ships. He therefore acquiesced to the ships' being armed with 28.3 cm guns, with the provision that they be upgunned to 38 cm at the earliest opportunity. The 38 cm turret was eventually used in the Bismarck-class battleships. A plan to upgrade Gneisenau with 38 cm guns was proposed in 1942 while she was under repair, which also required lengthening the hull, strengthening the barbettes, and overhauling the electrical system, but this was abandoned in 1943.

=== General characteristics ===
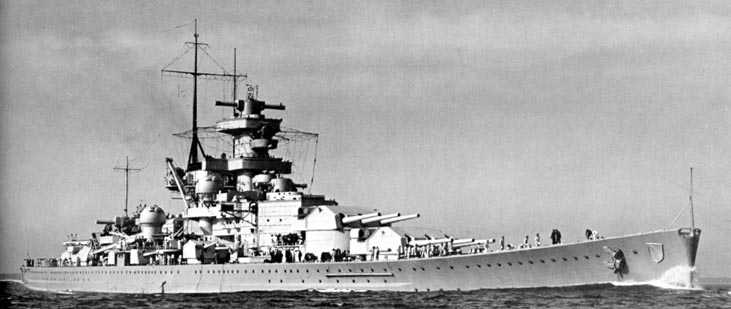
Scharnhorst, before the fitting of the "Atlantic bow"

Scharnhorst and Gneisenau were 226 m (741 ft 6 in) long at the waterline; Scharnhorst was 234.9 m (770 ft 8 in) long overall, while Gneisenau had a slightly shorter overall length, at 229.8 m (753 ft 11 in). The ships both had a beam of 30 m (98 ft 5 in). They were designed to displace 35,540 t (34,980 long tons), which would have given the ships a draft of 9.1 m (29 ft 10 in). At standard displacement of 32,100 long tons (32,600 t), which reduced draft to 8.3 m (27 ft 3 in), while at a full combat load of 38,100 long tons (38,700 t), draft increased to 9.9 m (32 ft 6 in). The ships' hulls were constructed from longitudinal steel frames, over which the outer hull plates were welded. Their hulls contained 21 watertight compartments and had a double bottom for 79% of their length.

The German navy considered the ships to be poor sea boats; they were bow-heavy when fully equipped and very "wet" as high as the bridge. This problem was mitigated to some extent by replacement of the straight stem with an "Atlantic bow" to both Gneisenau and Scharnhorst in January and August 1939 respectively; use of the "A" turret remained restricted in heavy seas. The ships' stern was also frequently "wet", they were very slow entering a turn, and always required assistance from tugboats in shallow waters. With the rudder hard over, the ships lost over 50% speed and heeled over more than 10°. During trials, the ships heeled as much as 13° at hard rudder.

Scharnhorst and Gneisenau had a crew of between 56 and 60 officers and 1,613 to 1,780 enlisted men. The crew was augmented by another 10 officers and 61 men when serving as a squadron flagship. They carried a number of smaller watercraft, including two picket boats, two launches, two barges, two pinnaces, two cutters, two yawls, and two dinghies.

=== Propulsion ===
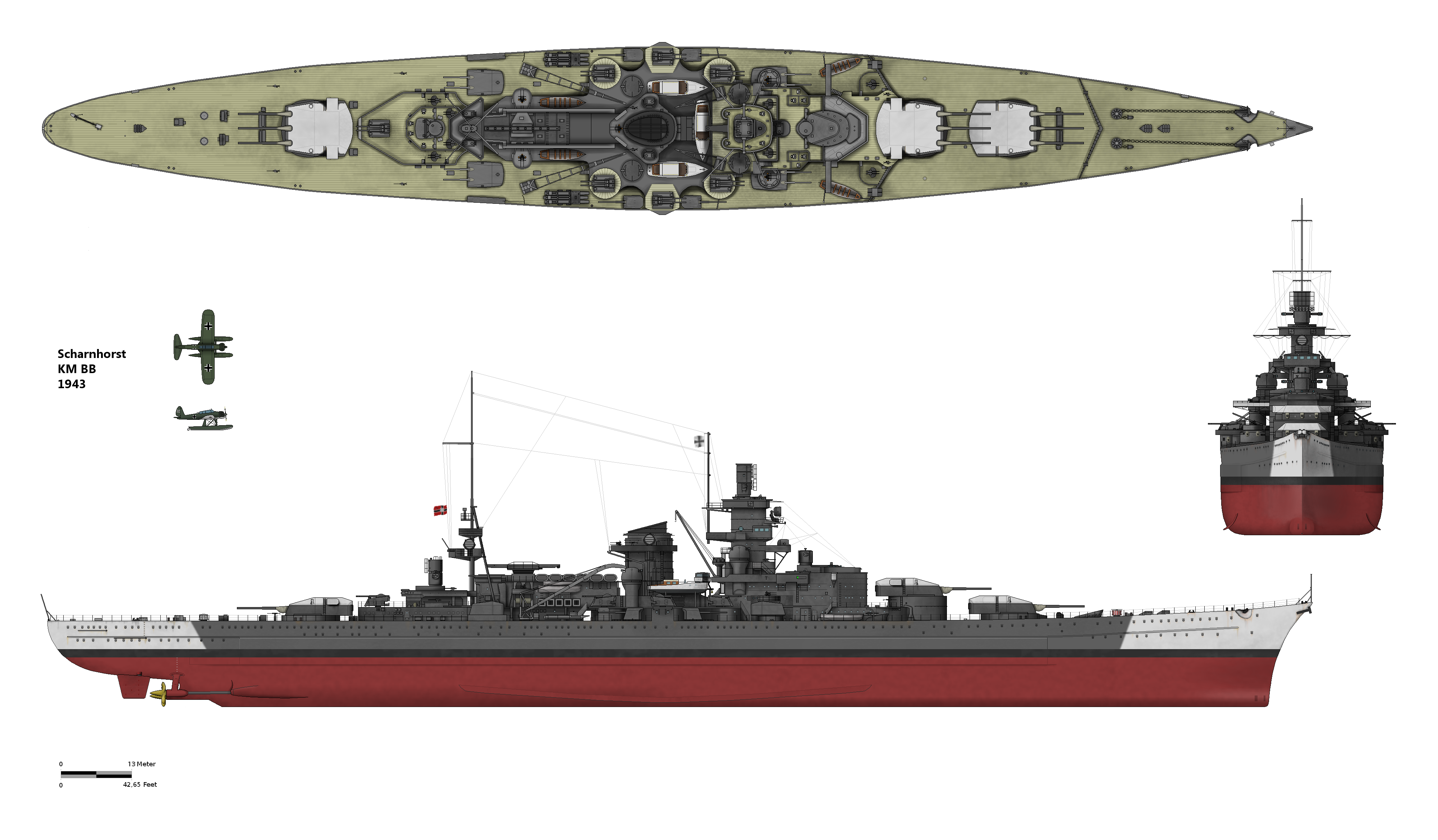
Scharnhorst, depicted in her 1943 configuration

Initially, diesel propulsion was planned for these ships, as had been used for the three Panzerschiffe. It was decided to use superheated steam propulsion, as the required total output for the desired speed was three times that of the Panzerschiffe. In the case of triple-screw ships, this would have meant more than twice the horsepower per shaft of the Panzerschiffe, and in the case of a quadruple-screw ship, this would have amounted to more than 40,000 horsepower per shaft. This requirement was beyond the diesel technology then available, and devising engines that could meet this demand would take an unforeseeable amount of time. Since high-pressure superheated steam had already proved successful, it was considered the most suitable choice for high power machinery.

Scharnhorst was powered by three Brown, Boveri, & Co geared steam turbines, while Gneisenau was equipped with three Germania geared turbines. The turbines drove three-bladed screws that were 4.8 m (15 ft 9 in) in diameter. Steam was provided to the turbines by 12 Wagner ultra-high-pressure oil-fired water-tube boilers, which produced pressures up to 58 standard atmospheres (5,900 kPa) and temperatures up to 450 °C (842 °F). The engines were rated at 160,000 metric horsepower (157,811 shp; 117,680 kW) at 265 revolutions per minute (rpm), and on trials produced up to 165,930 PS (163,660 ihp; 122,041 kW) at 280 rpm. When steaming in reverse, the engines were rated for 57,000 PS (56,220 ihp; 41,923 kW). The ships had a designed speed of 31 knots (57 km/h; 36 mph); on trials both vessels beat their designed speeds—Scharnhorst hit 31.5 kn (58.3 km/h; 36.2 mph) and Gneisenau made 31.3 knots (58.0 km/h; 36.0 mph). The ships carried 5,080 metric tons (5,000 long tons; 5,600 short tons) of fuel oil as designed; additional storage areas, including hull spaces between the belt and torpedo bulkhead, increased capacity to 6,100 metric tons (6,000 long tons; 6,700 short tons). At maximum fuel load, the ships were expected to steam for 8,100 nautical miles (15,000 km; 9,300 mi) at a cruising speed of 19 knots (35 km/h; 22 mph); Scharnhorst reached only 7,100 nmi (13,100 km; 8,200 mi) at 19 knots, while Gneisenau managed only 6,200 nmi (11,500 km; 7,100 mi) at that speed.

Electrical power was supplied to the ships by five electricity plants. Each plant consisted of four diesel generators and eight turbo-generators. The four diesel generators were divided into pairs: two provided 150 kilowatts each and two supplied 300 kW each. The eight turbo-generators were also of mixed capacity; six ran supplied 460 kW each and the remaining two provided 230 kW each. Total power output was 4,120 kW at 220 volts.

=== Armament ===
Scharnhorst's forward guns

The Scharnhorst-class ships were built with a main battery of nine 28.3 cm (11.1 inch) SK C/34 54.5 caliber quick-firing guns in three triple turrets, two forward and one aft. These guns were an improvement over the earlier 28.3 cm SK C/28 guns mounted on the Deutschland-class cruisers. While the 28.3 cm guns were of a smaller caliber than main guns of other navies, they were still preferred by a number of gunnery officers in the Kriegsmarine due to their higher rate of fire. The guns were equipped with three different types of shells, an armor-piercing (AP) L/4,4 shell that weighed 330 kg (727.5 lb) and two high explosive (HE) shells that both weighed 315 kg (694.4 lb)—an L/4,4 type with a base fuse and an L/4,5 version with a nose fuse. All three types of shells used the same propellant charges: an RPC/38 42.5 kg (93.7 lb) fore charge and an RPC/38 76.5 kg (168.6 lb) main charge. They fired these shells at a rate of fire of 3.5 rounds per minute.

Muzzle velocity for the AP shells was 890 meters per second (2,920 feet per second); the guns were expected to fire 300 rounds before enough wear had been incurred to warrant replacement. Scharnhorst's and Gneisenau's guns were mounted in three C/34 turrets. The turrets were named, in alphabetical order from the bow of the ship: "Anton", "Bruno" and "Cäsar". Similarly to most other German installations, those turrets had an electric system of rotation, but all other operations were hydraulic systems. The rotating mass of the turret was 750 tons (internal barbette diameter 10.2 m), and traversing speed was 7.2 deg/sec. The turrets allowed depression of the guns to −8° and elevation to 40° for "A" and "C" turrets; "B" turret was capable of depressing to −9°. At maximum elevation, the guns could hit targets out to 40,930 m (44,760 yards).

The ships carried a secondary battery of twelve 15 cm SK C/28 L/55 quick-firing guns. The guns were mounted in four C/34 twin turrets and four C/35 pedestal mounts. Both the turrets and pedestal mounts enabled barrel depression to −10°; the turrets allowed elevation to 40° while the pedestals limited it to 35°. These guns fired 45.3 kg (99.87 lb) shells at a rate of 6–8 per minute. They were expected to fire 1,100 rounds before barrel wear made repair or replacement necessary. The guns in pedestals had a range of 22,000 m (24,060 yd), while those in the turrets, capable of 5 more degrees of elevation, had a slightly longer range, at 23,000 m (25,153 yd). They were supplied with between 1,600 and 1,800 shells, or 133–150 shells per gun.

Their anti-aircraft battery consisted of fourteen 10.5 cm C/33 L/65 guns, sixteen 3.7 cm L/83 guns, and between ten and twenty 2 cm guns. The 10.5 cm guns fired at a rate of 15–18 rounds per minute, and had an effective ceiling of 12,500 m (41,010 feet). They were mounted in six C/31 twin mounts amidships, and one such mount superfiring over "C" turret, which allowed depression to −8° and elevation to 80°. When used to engage surface targets, the guns had a maximum range of 17,700 m (19,357 yd) at an elevation of 45°. The 10.5 cm guns were directed by four SL-6 stabilized anti-aircraft director posts. The 3.7 cm guns were placed in eight manually operated C/30 twin mounts. At 85°, they had an effective ceiling of 6,800 m (22,310 ft), though tracers were limited to 4,800 m (15,750 ft). They had a rate of fire of 30 rounds per minute.

In October 1939 both Scharnhorst and Gneisenau were equipped with a Seetakt radar mounted on the foretop rangefinder. A second radar set was emplaced on the rear rangefinder in 1942 whilst the ships were in Brest. The Seetakt sets operated at 368 megacycles (MHz.), initially at 14 kW. The sets were later upgraded to operate at 100 kW, on the 80 cm wavelength (375 MHz.). In March 1941, two triple 53.3 cm deck-mounted torpedo tubes were taken from the light cruisers Nürnberg and Leipzig each and installed on the Scharnhorst and Gneisenau respectively, with storage for 18 G7a torpedoes.

=== Armor ===
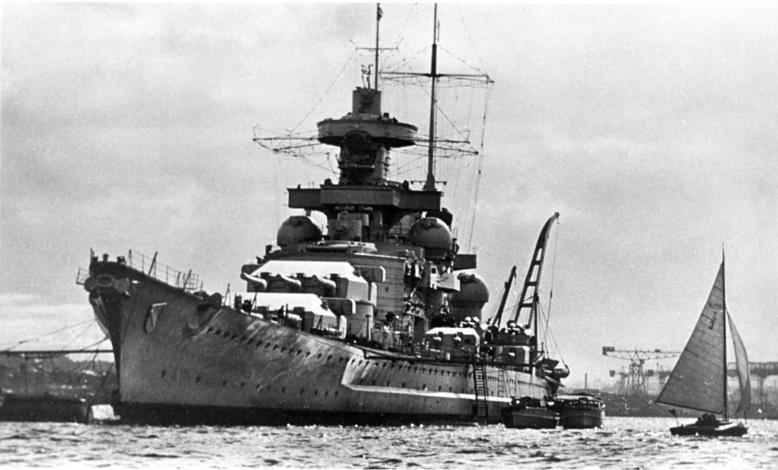
Scharnhorst in harbor; the thickness of the armor belt is easily seen

Scharnhorst; schematic of armor distribution amidships.

The Scharnhorst-class ships were equipped with Krupp armor. Their upper armored deck was 50 mm (2.0 in) thick, and backed by the main armor deck. This deck was 20 mm (0.79 in) thick aft, increased to 50 mm in the central portion of the ship that contained the ammunition magazines and machinery spaces, and decreased down to 20 mm in the bow. It was supported by 105 mm (4.1 in) thick slopes on either longitudinal side. The slopes connected to the lower edge of the main belt, an arrangement referred to as the "turtle deck." The slopes significantly increased armor protection in the critical areas of the ship. The ships' vitals were well armored against any caliber shell fired by battleships at the time at ranges where the shell would have to penetrate both the main belt and the sloping deck. At very long ranges, the deck armor could be easily penetrated by heavy-caliber shells. All of these sections were composed of Wotan Hart (Wotan Hard) steel. (Note: Wotan Hart armor had a breaking strength of 85–96 kg/sq mm, and would expand up to 20%. Wotan Weich armor had a breaking strength of 65–75 kg/sq mm, and expanded up to 25%. See: Gröner, p. x.) The armored belt was 320 mm (13 in) thick in the central portion of the ship, where the critical areas of the ship were located. Forward of the "A" turret the belt was reduced to 150 mm (5.9 in), which tapered down to zero at the bow of the ship. Aft of the rear gun turret the belt decreased to 200 mm (7.9 in), and eventually tapered down to nothing at the stern. The central portion of the belt was backed by 170 mm (6.7 in) thick shields. The belt armor was composed of Krupp Cemented steel (KC). The side protection system could not be penetrated by a 2,240 lb (1,020 kg) 16 in (406 mm) shell at any range over 11,000 m (12,000 yd).

The forward conning tower had 350 mm-thick sides and a roof that was 200 mm-thick. The rear conning tower was less well armored, with sides and a roof that were only 100 mm (3.9 in) and 50 mm thick, respectively. The gun turrets for the main battery had 360 mm (14 in) thick faces, 200 mm thick sides, and 150 mm thick roofs. The barbettes that held the 28 cm gun turrets were also heavily armored; the sides were 350 mm thick and tapered down to 200 mm on the centerline, where they were shielded by the gun turrets above. The faces of the 15 cm turrets were 140 mm (5.5 in) thick, with 60 mm (2.4 in) thick sides and 50 mm thick roofs. The 10.5 cm gun mounts were equipped with 20 mm (0.79 in) gun shields. All of this armor was KC steel.

The underwater protection system was designed to withstand a direct hit from a 250 kg (550 lb) explosive warhead; British aerial torpedoes had smaller warheads than this, but their ship-launched weapons were more powerful. The navy conducted several full-scale underwater explosion tests with sections of armor cut from the old pre-dreadnought Preussen. The tests revealed that welded steel construction better withstood the impact of the 250 kg warhead than did riveted steel plates. The torpedo bulkhead, composed of Wotan Weich (Wotan, soft) steel, placed behind the armored belt was riveted; this was done because plate joints that had been incorrectly welded would not sufficiently withstand explosive shocks. The underwater protection system was constructed out of several layers: the outer layer that was between 12 and 66 mm (.47–2.6 in) thick, directly underneath the main armored belt, was designed to detonate the torpedo warhead. Behind the outer plate was a large void which would allow gases from the explosion to expand and dissipate. Beyond this was a fuel bunker with an 8 mm (0.31 in) thick outer wall; this would absorb any remaining explosive force. The bunker was supported by longitudinal stiffeners and transverse bulkheads.

The underwater side protection had numerous faults. It was extremely strong amidships, but weakened on either end of the citadel. The underwater protection could stop only a 200 kg (440 lb) warhead in these areas. Another significant weakness in the design was the arrangement of the torpedo bulkhead. It was connected to the lower portion of the sloped deck, at an angle of 10°; two riveted angled bars held it in place. The bars were constantly under a great deal of stress, due to normal bending forces in the hull. When combined with the explosive force of a torpedo warhead, the bars could not sustain the increased pressure and could fail. Also, the beam of 30 m meant that the protection system had to be weaker around the main battery turrets, as a significant amount of the hull space was taken up by the magazines and barbettes.

== Service history ==
Construction data
Name	Namesake	Builder	Laid down	Launched	Commissioned	Fate
Scharnhorst	Gerhard von Scharnhorst	Kriegsmarinewerft, Wilhelmshaven	15 June 1935	3 October 1936	7 January 1939	Sunk following surface action, 26 December 1943
Gneisenau	August Neidhardt von Gneisenau	Deutsche Werke, Kiel	6 May 1935	8 December 1936	21 May 1938	Sunk as blockship at Gotenhafen, 23 March 1945; hull raised for breaking up, 1951

=== Construction and early actions ===
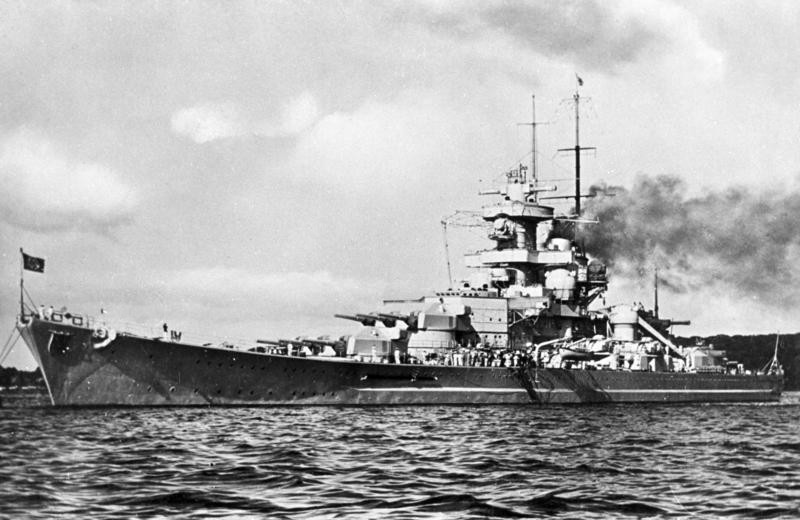
Gneisenau in harbor

Gneisenau was laid down on 3 May 1935 at the Deutsche Werke in Kiel. She was launched on 8 December 1936, and completed on 21 May 1938. During her launch, the ship sustained minor damage to her stern; the chains slowing her slide down the slipway broke, and the ship drifted too far and became beached on the opposite shore. After her commissioning, Gneisenau spent the first year of her career conducting trials and training cruises in the Baltic Sea. The cruises revealed the wetness of the bow and bridge; in January 1939 her "Atlantic bow" was installed. Scharnhorst was laid down at the Kriegsmarinewerft in Wilhelmshaven, on 16 May 1935. She was launched on 30 June 1936 and completed on 7 January 1939. In mid 1939, the ship conducted trials in the Baltic Sea; as with Gneisenau, the ship's low freeboard necessitated the installation of the "Atlantic bow", which was completed in August 1939. During that refit, a large hangar for the ship's aircraft was added amidships. The ship emerged from the dockyard in October.

On 21 November, Scharnhorst and Gneisenau conducted a sweep between Iceland and the Faroe Islands; during the operation, the German ships encountered the British armed merchant cruiser HMS Rawalpindi; Scharnhorst sank the ship, but in the process sustained a hit from one of Rawalpindi's 152 mm guns. Scharnhorst stopped to pick up survivors, but the arrival of the cruiser HMS Newcastle prompted the German ships to withdraw.

=== Operation Weserübung ===
On 7 April 1940, Scharnhorst and Gneisenau formed the primary covering force for the invasions of Narvik and Trondheim in Norway during Operation Weserübung. At 04:30 on 9 April, the Seetakt radar on Gneisenau picked up a contact, beginning the action off Lofoten; both ships went to battle stations. Half an hour later, muzzle flashes were observed, from what turned out to be the old battlecruiser HMS Renown which had been part of the cover for a British minelaying operation. The British battlecruiser initially targeted Gneisenau, at a range of 11,800 m (12,900 yd). In the span of five minutes, Gneisenau hit Renown twice, but sustained one 15" and two 4.5" hits in return. One of the two 4.5" hits disabled Gneisenau's A turret, (Note: Koop & Schmolke, pp. 40 and 43. The A turret flooded due to heavy seas, with "Heavy quantities seawater coming through left optic of rangefinder cupola after hit knocked away cover." (p. 40) "All electrical equipment in the turret was unusable for 36 hours The rangefinder itself remained undamaged." (p. 43)) the 15" hit destroyed the main armament fire-control station, and knocked out her Seetakt radar. Scharnhorst's gunnery radar suffered technical problems, which prevented her from effectively engaging Renown. The British ship engaged Scharnhorst for a brief period starting at 05:18, but effective maneuvering by Scharnhorst allowed her to escape unscathed. Fears that the destroyers escorting Renown might make a torpedo attack prompted the German commander to break off the engagement. By 07:15, the German ships had escaped from the slower Renown. In the course of their escape Scharnhorst suffered from damage to her A turret caused by the heavy seas coming over her bows. Scharnhorst and Gneisenau rendezvoused with the heavy cruiser Admiral Hipper before proceeding to Wilhelmshaven.

=== Operation Juno ===
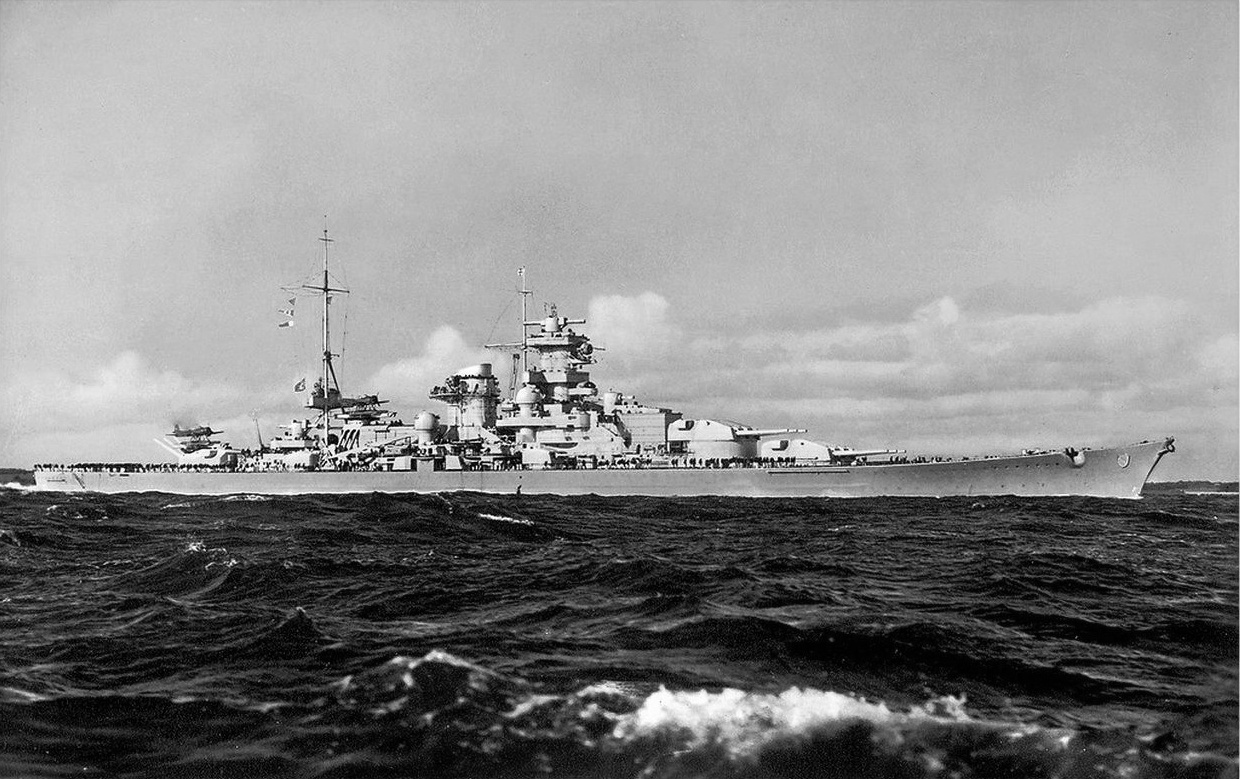
Scharnhorst after her "Atlantic bow" had been added

Scharnhorst and Gneisenau, with Admiral Hipper and four destroyers, departed again on 4 June for Operation Juno. After operations in the Arctic Sea that resulted in the sinking of several British ships, Admiral Hipper and the destroyers were detached to refuel in occupied Norway. At 16:45 on 8 June, Scharnhorst and Gneisenau spotted the British aircraft carrier HMS Glorious, which was escorted by the destroyers Acasta and Ardent, at a range of around 50,000 m (55,000 yd). The destroyers laid a smoke screen in an attempt to hide the carrier, but the Germans quickly closed the distance. At 17:26, the range had decreased by half, to around 25,000 m (27,000 yd), and both German ships opened fire. Scharnhorst struck Glorious at a range of approximately 24,200 m (26,500 yd), one of the longest recorded hits in the history of naval gunfire. (Note: The British battleship HMS Warspite scored a hit on the Italian battleship Giulio Cesare at the Battle of Calabria in 1940 at approximately the same range.) Glorious was hit by at least three shells and reduced to a burning hulk, and at 19:00 the carrier capsized and sank. Scharnhorst shifted fire to Ardent while Gneisenau engaged Acasta; both ships sank their targets. Before she sank, Acasta launched four torpedoes at Scharnhorst; the ship evaded three, but the fourth struck the starboard side near the rear gun turret. During the engagement, Scharnhorst fired 212 main battery shells. The torpedo hit caused significant damage to Scharnhorst; several watertight compartments, including parts of the starboard engine room, were flooded, she took on a list of 3°, and she was 3 m (9 ft 10 in) down by the stern.

The two ships withdrew to Trondheim, though Scharnhorst was limited to a speed of 20 knots (37 km/h; 23 mph)—they arrived in the afternoon of 9 June. On 11 June, 12 Hudson bombers from the RAF attempted to bomb Scharnhorst; they all missed their target. Another air raid, this time 15 Blackburn Skuas launched by the Royal Navy's HMS Ark Royal, followed on 13 June. The Luftwaffe intercepted the raid and shot down eight of the aircraft; seven made it through to the ship. Only one bomb found its mark, but it failed to explode. On 20 June, enough repair work had been done to permit the ship to sail down to Kiel. Two air attacks followed, but anti-aircraft fire from Scharnhorst and her escorts drove them both back. Reports of British ships in the area forced the ship to seek refuge in Stavanger for two days, before she resumed the journey to Kiel. Repairs were effected over the following six months.

=== Operation Berlin ===
Under the command of Admiral Günther Lütjens, Scharnhorst and Gneisenau broke into the Atlantic in late January 1941 to raid convoys between North America and Great Britain. On 8 February, they spotted a convoy, HX 106, but it was escorted by the battleship HMS Ramillies, armed with eight 38 cm (15 in) guns. The German ships therefore broke off the attack. On 22 February, Gneisenau ran into three independent sailing merchant ships from a recently dispersed convoy. The battleships abandoned their search for convoys and started to hunt independent sailing ships, Gneisenau sank four vessels totalling 19,634 GRT and Scharnhorst sank the 6,150 GRT tanker Lustrous. Lütjens then decided to move away from the North-Atlantic convoy lanes and move the West African convoy lanes. On 8 March, Scharnhorst spotted convoy SL 67, but again the attack had to be abandoned as the convoy was escorted by a battleship: HMS Malaya. Lütjens returned to the North-Atlantic convoy lanes, on their way Scharnhorst sank the 7,921 GRT Greek cargo ship Marathon. On 15 and 16 March they encountered ships from a dispersed convoy. Scharnhorst sank six ships totaling 35,080 GRT, whilst Gneisenau sank seven ships totaling 26,693 GRT and captured another three ships totaling 20,139 GRT as prizes. Following this success, Scharnhorst and Gneisenau headed for Brest in occupied France; they arrived on 22 March. Scharnhorst had suffered repeated problems with defective superheater tubes in her boilers and this needed the repair facilities that existed in the French naval dockyard.

=== Air raid damage ===
Brest was comfortably within range for air attack from Britain. A series of raids started on 30 March. (Note: Over the course of the war, 300 air raids made Brest one of the most bombed cities in France.) On 6 April, four Beaufort torpedo-bombers attacked Gneisenau after she had been moved to a buoy from dry dock. One of the attacking aircraft was successful; (Note: Gneisenau was protected by many anti-aircraft guns but no torpedo netting. The aircraft making the successful attack was shot down; the pilot, F/O Campbell, was awarded a posthumous Victoria Cross, as he would have been well aware of the minimal chances of surviving the intense anti-aircraft fire.) the hit did significant damage to the ship. Gneisenau shipped some 3,050 metric tons (3,000 long tons; 3,360 short tons) of water, which caused her to list 2° and settle lower in the water. The shock force of the explosion also did a great deal of internal damage; fuel tanks were ruptured and electrical systems were damaged. A salvage tugboat was brought alongside to assist in flood control. Gneisenau was put into dry dock for repairs, which were prolonged by further British air raids. On the night of 9–10 April, British high-level bombers attacked both Gneisenau and Scharnhorst. The latter escaped unscathed, but the former was struck four times; 72 men were killed and another 90 were wounded.

Scharnhorst completed engine repairs and the retubing of the defective superheaters in July, and after engine trials, was dispersed to La Pallice on 23 July to avoid a concentration of heavy units in Brest. (Note: Prinz Eugen had arrived in Brest on 1 June.) While moored there on 24 July, Scharnhorst was attacked by 15 Halifax bombers from 2 squadrons; five bombs—two high explosive 227 kg (500 lb) and three semi-AP 454 kg (1,001 lb)—found their mark. The two 454 kg bombs penetrated both armored decks, all the way down through the double bottom, before coming to rest on the sea floor; they failed to explode. The third also failed to detonate. One of the 227 kg bombs penetrated the upper deck just forward of the rear gun turret, and exploded on the main armored deck. The last bomb fell on the starboard side and also detonated on the main armor deck. The ship listed at 8°, after having taken in between 1,520 long tons (1,700 short tons) and 3,050 long tons (3,420 short tons) of water; the list was reduced to 2° by counter-flooding. Casualties amounted to two men killed and 15 wounded. The following day Scharnhorst arrived in Brest for repairs, which lasted for four months.

=== Operation Cerberus ===
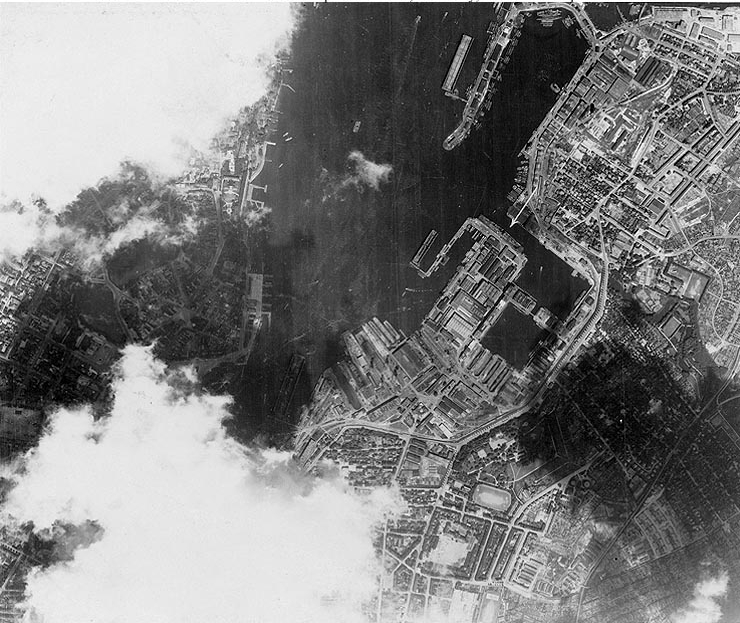
Aerial reconnaissance photograph of Scharnhorst in Kiel, after the "Channel Dash"

In early 1942, the crews of Scharnhorst, Gneisenau, and the heavy cruiser Prinz Eugen made preparations for Operation Cerberus, a daylight dash up the English Channel. The ships were to be redeployed to Norway, to assist in the disruption of convoys to the Soviet Union, as well as the defense of occupied Norway. The risk of further damage from air raids, and the loss of the Bismarck and most of the supply ships had forced a change of thinking by the naval staff on the use of these ships for Atlantic sorties. If they could not be evacuated, Hitler ordered that they were to be decommissioned in Brest.

The ships left Brest late on 11 February, and remained undetected for the majority of the operation. East of Dover, a flight of six Swordfish torpedo bombers attacked the ships without result. At 15:31, Scharnhorst detonated a magnetic mine, which damaged the ship's circuit breakers enough to shut down the entire electrical system. The ship was immobilized briefly—between 15:49 and 16:01, all three turbines were restarted and the ship resumed a speed of 27 knots (50 km/h; 31 mph). A series of air attacks ensued; through evasive maneuvers, anti-aircraft fire, and Luftwaffe fighters, they were all repulsed. By noon on 13 February, Scharnhorst had reached Wilhelmshaven. After two days she was transferred to Kiel for repairs, which lasted until July 1942.

Gneisenau and Prinz Eugen had continued their journey to Germany while Scharnhorst was immobilized. At 14:45, the ships were attacked by five Whirlwind fighter-bombers—German fighters beat them back. Several more air attacks followed over the next two hours, without success for the British. At 16:17, five British destroyers attempted to torpedo the German ships, but heavy fire from Gneisenau and Prinz Eugen mauled one and forced the others to turn away. Near Terschelling, Gneisenau struck a mine that did minor damage to the hull, and the explosive shock damaged one of her three turbines. Her captain ordered the ship to stop while temporary repairs were conducted, which lasted for about 30 minutes. By 03:50 on 13 February, the ship had reached Heligoland.

=== Scharnhorst's deployment to Norway ===
In January 1943, it was decided to deploy Scharnhorst to Norway, along with Prinz Eugen and several destroyers. Attempts to sail on 7 and 23 January were aborted after the navy received reports of heavy activity at British air bases in Britain. A third try on 10 February terminated when Scharnhorst ran aground while trying to avoid collision with a U-boat. Repairs lasted until 26 February. On 8 March, Scharnhorst and four destroyers departed Gotenhafen; she arrived off Narvik on 14 March. For 6 months, fuel shortages curtailed any major operations by Scharnhorst or the other ships in Norway, which included the battleship Tirpitz and the heavy cruiser Lützow. On 25 November 1943 Scharnhorst carried out a two-hour full-power trial, achieving 29.6 knots (54.8 km/h; 34.1 mph), and it was noted that her draught had increased by over .5 meters (1.6 ft) from her 1940 trials, where she had attained 31.14 knots (57.67 km/h; 35.84 mph).

==== Battle of North Cape ====
On 20 December 1943, Scharnhorst was ordered to intercept the next convoy to the Soviet Union, Convoy JW 55B. The ship was to operate only with five destroyers; Tirpitz had been damaged in a British raid in September, and Lützow was away for periodic repairs. On 25 December, the location of the convoy was ascertained, and at 19:00 the ship left port, under the command of Rear-Admiral Erich Bey. The British fleet had a significant advantage: they were able to decrypt German naval codes, and were aware of Bey's intentions. The cruisers HMS Sheffield, Belfast, and Norfolk were positioned to block Scharnhorst. Admiral Bruce Fraser, aboard the battleship HMS Duke of York, was some 270 miles away, and steaming to cut off Scharnhorst after she was engaged by the three cruisers. Belfast picked up Scharnhorst on radar at 08:40; forty minutes later lookouts on Sheffield spotted the ship, at a distance of 11,000 m (12,000 yd). Shortly thereafter, Belfast fired star shells to illuminate the target, and Norfolk opened fire with her 20.3 cm (8 in) guns; in the span of 20 minutes, she hit Scharnhorst twice. The second hit destroyed Scharnhorst's forward Seetakt radar.

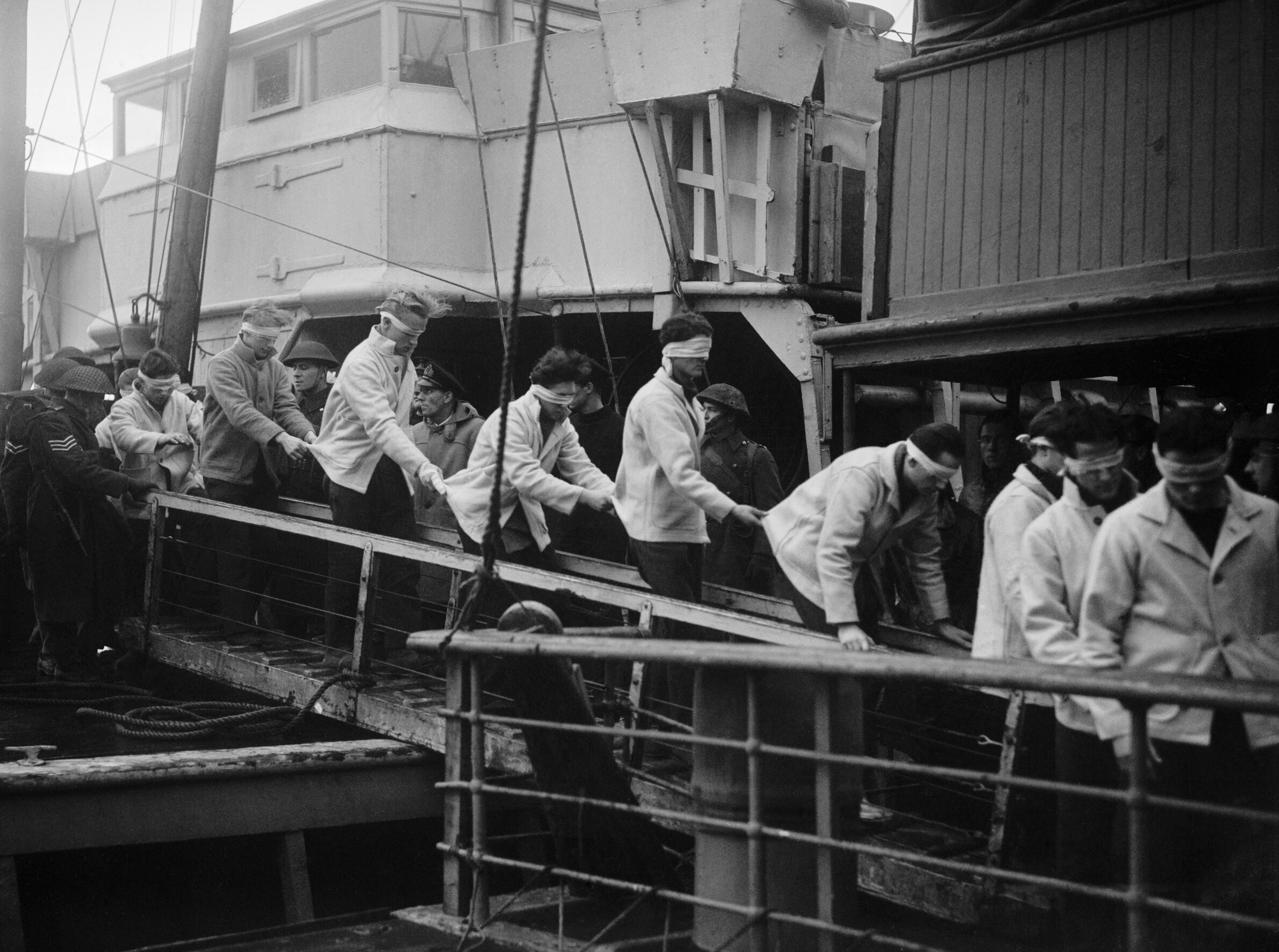
Survivors from Scharnhorst disembarking in Scapa Flow

By 10:00, Scharnhorst, using her 4–6 knot speed advantage, broke off the engagement and resumed searching for the convoy. At 12:00, Belfast again picked up Scharnhorst, and in 20 minutes were again in range. This time, Scharnhorst had better luck with her gunnery; at 12:23, Norfolk was hit twice by 28.3 cm shells. One hit disabled a gun turret, and the second tore a hole in the hull and disabled her radar. Near-misses rained shell splinters down on Sheffield. At 12:41, Scharnhorst again increased speed and broke off the engagement. The British shadowed her, and relayed position reports to Admiral Fraser in Duke of York. At 13:15, Admiral Bey decided to call off the search and return to port. Shortly before 17:00, the British ships closed in: Belfast again illuminated the ship with star shells, while Duke of York fired salvos from her main battery. A hit from Duke of York disabled "A" turret, and at 18:00, another hit penetrated the upper portion of the belt and caused significant damage to the engine room. This hit temporarily reduced her speed to 8 knots (15 km/h; 9.2 mph), but repairs quickly allowed her to steam at 22 knots (41 km/h; 25 mph).

Shells from Scharnhorst's main guns struck Duke of York's mast and disabled her surface radars. The lack of radar forced Duke of York to cease fire at 18:24, after having hit Scharnhorst at least 13 times. The hits from Duke of York disabled most of Scharnhorst's armament in the process. Admiral Fraser ordered his destroyers to approach the ship and torpedo her. Scharnhorst was hit at least four times by torpedoes fired by HMS Scorpion and HNoMS Stord. The hits caused extensive flooding and slowed the ship to 12 knots (22 km/h; 14 mph). Duke of York then closed to 9,100 m (10,000 yd) to hammer away at the ship. At the time, only "C" turret on Scharnhorst remained operational; surviving gun crews transferred ammunition from the disabled "A" and "B" turrets to "C" turret. As more water entered Scharnhorst, her speed continued to fall to 5 knots (9.3 km/h; 5.8 mph). At 19:25, the light cruiser Jamaica fired three torpedoes, followed by six from Belfast. Several destroyers closed in and fired torpedoes as well, though in the smoke and haze, it was unknown how many hit the crippled ship. Scharnhorst was listing severely and very low in the water. At 19:45, the ship capsized to starboard and sank, with her propellers still spinning. She sank at the position 72°16′0″N 28°41′0″E. Of the crew of 1,968 officers and men, only 36 survived. Rear-Admiral Erich Bey was lost with his ship.

=== Gneisenau's reconstruction ===
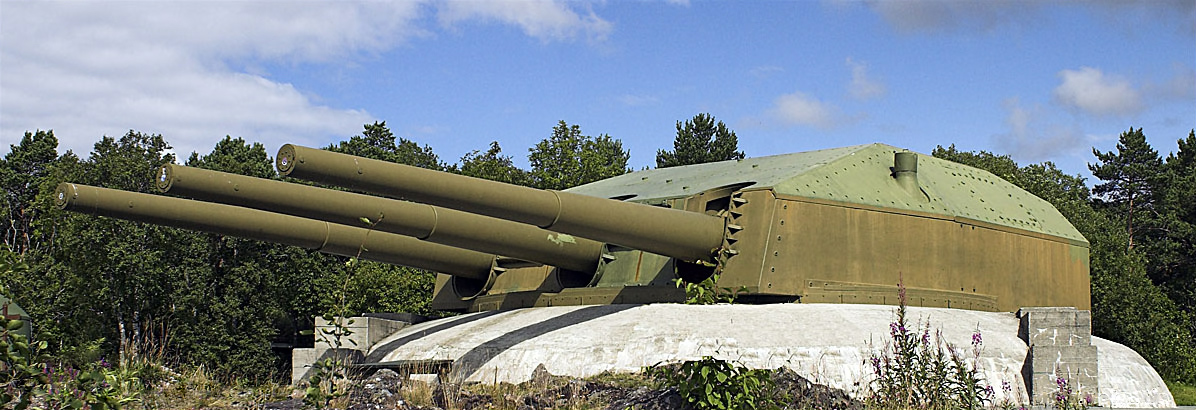
Gneisenau's "C" turret in Norway

Gneisenau was also scheduled to deploy to Norway, but she suffered heavy damage during a bombing raid on the night of 26–27 February 1942. A 1000 lb bomb penetrated the armored deck just ahead of the forward turret; shell splinters detonated the ammunition magazine, which did tremendous damage to the bow of the ship and burnt out "A" turret; 112 men were killed and another 21 were injured. It was estimated that it would take two years to make the ship ready for service. Since this was such a long period, it was determined that it would be more efficient if during the repair work, the ship was reconstructed to mount six 38 cm (15 in) guns in place of her 28.3 cm weapons. To accomplish this, the hull would need to be lengthened by 10 m (32 ft 10 in) to provide additional buoyancy and the electrical system would have to be overhauled. Turrets "B" and "C" were to be removed and transferred to Norway to serve as coastal defense guns.

On 4 April, Gneisenau, along with the icebreaker Castor and the old pre-dreadnought Schlesien departed Kiel for Gotenhafen. Once there, conversion work began: the wrecked bow was removed and her "B" and "C" turrets were removed and disassembled for transport. Krupp would build the new 38 cm turrets, which required strengthening of the barbette structures to support their weight. By early 1943, repair work was largely completed and the ship was ready to receive the improved bow and 38 cm turrets, but this was not to be. The failure of surface units to destroy a convoy in the Arctic during Operation Regenbogen on 31 December 1942 prompted Hitler to order all major surface units to be scrapped. Work on Gneisenau ceased, and materials that had been allocated for her repair were diverted to other projects.

The ship was then disarmed and all but abandoned in the harbor. Her 15 cm guns were placed as coastal batteries in Denmark. When the Soviet army approached in early 1945, the ship was towed out into the outer harbor and sunk as a block ship, on 23 March 1945. A Polish salvage firm raised the wreck on 12 September 1951 and subsequently broke the ship up for scrap metal. "C" Turret remains in Trondheim, Norway at Austrått Fort; the Norwegian government offered without success to return the turret to Germany for display in a museum. The 15 cm guns in Denmark were taken over by the Danish military; two of the turrets were moved to Stevnsfort in 1952. The guns were put into reserve in 1984, but continued to be fired during annual training. They fired their last shot in 2000, after which the fortress was turned into a museum.

== See also ==
- Design 1047 battlecruiser – a Dutch battlecruiser design that was heavily influenced by the Scharnhorst-class design.
