= Norwegian Defence Estates Agency =

- Forsvarsbygg

Agency overview
- Formed: 1 January 2002
- Jurisdiction: Government of Norway
- Headquarters: Oslo
- Employees: 1,279 (2007)
- Minister responsible: Anne-Grete Strøm-Erichsen, Minister of Defence
- Parent agency: Norwegian Ministry of Defence
- Website: www.forsvarsbygg.no

The Norwegian Defence Estates Agency (Norwegian: Forsvarsbygg) is a Norwegian government agency responsible for the real estate belonging to the Military of Norway. It is not part of the military operations, but is instead directly subordinate to the Norwegian Ministry of Defence, and established on 1 January 2002. The agency has Havnelageret in Oslo as its headquarters. The agency both builds, operates and sells military real estate. In total it had six million square meters of real estate, fifteen million square meters of roads and open areas, in addition to 1,250 square kilometers of land. It employed 1,300 people in 2006. The division Skifte Eiendom is responsible to sell former military estates to prive, while National Fortifications Heritage owns and manages former military installations that are part of the cultural heritage.
