= Design 1047 battlecruiser =

Proposed class of Dutch battlecruisers

- A "plan and profile" of Nevesbu's Project 1047; it is not specified if this depicts the final design.

Class overview
- Name: Design 1047
- Operators: Koninklijke Marine (intended)
- Planned: 3
- Completed: 0

General characteristics
- Type: Battlecruiser
- Displacement: 27,988 tonnes (27,546 long tons; 30,851 short tons)
- Length: 236 m (774 ft) p.p.; 241.2 m (791 ft) overall
- Beam: 29.4 m (96 ft) (outside armor); 30.85 m (101.2 ft) (upper deck)
- Draft: 7.8 m (26 ft) (trial)
- Propulsion: Not finalized; 4-shaft geared turbines and 8 boilers were certain, but shp would have been either 160,000 or 180,000; the latter would have allowed a top speed of around 34 knots
- Armament: 9 × 283 mm (11.1 in) guns (3 × 3) (Note: Although the guns are given as 28 cm (280 mm) in most texts, all 28 cm German guns had an actual bore diameter of 28.3 cm, or 283 mm. See DeGuilian on Navweaps.com.) (Note: In addition, the caliber length of the guns is disputed; three sources give three different caliber numbers. Gardiner and Chesneau (1980), p. 388 says 45 caliber, Worth (2002), p. 217 says 50 caliber, and DeGuilian on Navweaps.com gives 54.5 caliber.); 12 × 120 mm (4.7 in)/45 caliber guns (6 × 2); 14 × 40 mm Bofors (7 × 2); 8 × 20 mm Oerlikon (8 × 1)
- Armor: Main side belt: 225 mm (9 in) inclined at 72° (external); Upper side belt: 40 mm (1.6 in) (vertical); Longitudinal anti-torpedo bulkhead: 40 mm (1.6 in); Upper deck: 20 mm (0.79 in) (Note: Noot (1980), p. 270 puts a question mark after this number.); Main armored deck: 100 mm (4 in) on 15 mm (0.59 in) deck plating; Lower deck: 30 mm (1 in); Boiler uptakes: 225 mm (8.9 in) gratings (main deck) and 75 mm (3.0 in) (lower deck); Underwater protection: Bulge below main side belt (depth 1.5 m (4.9 ft)); Conning tower: 150 mm (5.9 in); Steering compartment: 150 mm (5.9 in); Steering compartment main deck: 125 mm (4.9 in); Armored bulkhead: 40 mm (1.6 in); Barbettes for main turrets: 250 mm (10 in) above upper deck; 200 mm (7.9 in) between main and upper decks; 40 mm (1.6 in) director tower communication; Barbettes for secondary armament: 75 mm (3.0 in) above upper deck; 60 mm (2.4 in) director towers
- Notes: all of the above characteristics are from a drawing dated 19 April 1940, with the exception of the armament; those are from a drawing done on 16 February 1940.

Design 1047, also known as Project 1047, was a series of plans for a class of Dutch battlecruisers prior to the Second World War. These large capital ships were intended to counter the threat posed by Japanese aggression towards the Dutch colonies in the East Indies.

Dutch intelligence believed that if it came to war, the Imperial Japanese Navy would deploy its capital ships (aircraft carriers and battleships) against their counterparts of the United States Navy and the British Royal Navy. That would leave heavy and light cruisers, along with seaplane carriers, as the largest warships available for an advance into the East Indies.

To combat a force of these ships, in the 1930s the Koninklijke Marine (Royal Netherlands Navy) prepared designs for a new class of battlecruisers. Their work was shaped by the perceived need to fight their way through a fleet of those cruisers and smaller destroyers; the Dutch hoped that this would allow the battlecruisers to act as a fleet in being. However, the Dutch had never designed a modern capital ship, and this was reflected in a preliminary plan completed on 11 July 1939: it was missing many of the post-First World War advances in warship technology, and the armor protection was completely outmoded.

After an extended period of negotiations, Germany and the Netherlands reached an agreement where Germany would release plans and drawings based upon their ideas for a battlecruiser. In return, the Dutch would guarantee that all the required equipment would be ordered from German firms. With German assistance, a rough design was formulated by February 1940. A visit to Italy prompted a rethink of the internal layout, which led to a set of drawings dated 19 April 1940. This is the last known design produced prior to Germany's invasion and occupation of the Netherlands. Final plans for the ships were never completed, and the ships were never constructed.

== Background ==
The Japanese invasion of Manchuria in 1931 marked a period of increasing belligerence from the Japanese Empire, and as the decade progressed the Dutch grew concerned about the security of their East Indies colonies. The islands, which included Java, Sumatra, Borneo and part of New Guinea, were enormously important both politically and strategically to the Dutch, who had lived and traded there for more than three centuries. Over 500,000 settlers had moved from the Netherlands to this "second homeland", and the East Indies possessed abundant valuable resources, the most important of which were the rubber plantations and oilfields; the islands were the fourth-largest exporters of oil in the world, behind the United States, Iran, and Romania. (Note: The statistics given are for 1935. The top five oil exporters in this year were, in order, the United States, with 6,958 kt, Persia (Iran), with 6,860 kt, Romania, with 6,221 kt, the Dutch East Indies, with 5,139 kt, and the Soviet Union, with 3,369 kt. See: The Way to Pearl Harbor: US vs Japan, accessed 27 February 2009. Full citation given below.)

The Koninklijke Marine had only one seagoing armored ship stationed in the East Indies, the coastal-defense ship HNLMS Soerabaja (ex-De Zeven Provinciën). As this ship was considered to be "of little remaining combat value", three light cruisers (Java, Sumatra and De Ruyter), a few destroyers, and a large submarine fleet were charged with the main naval defense of the islands.

The Dutch believed that if war broke out, Japan's capital ships would be preoccupied with the battleships of the United States Navy and the British Royal Navy, meaning that the defenses of the East Indies would need to cope only with Japan's cruisers. However, the ships were more powerful than their Dutch equivalents and Japan would also have the advantage of numbers. It was estimated that by 1944, should no new vessels be ordered, the five light cruisers of the Koninklijke Marine (two of the Java class, which were laid down during the First World War, De Ruyter, and two of the Tromp class) could be facing 18 heavy and 27 light Japanese cruisers. (Note: The last Agano-class cruiser, Sakawa, was not completed until 30 November 1944; 44 cruisers could have been assembled to attack the East Indies in early 1943 if need be. This count also includes two Chinese light cruisers that were captured in 1937 and a planned hermaphrodite cruiser–seaplane ship (although due to the war, she was completed with a normal catapult and two planes). See Ōyodo and Gardiner and Chesneau (1980), pp. 191–192)

These factors forced the Koninklijke Marine to bolster this force, and so the construction of three "super cruisers" capable of overpowering cruisers of the Imperial Japanese Navy was contemplated. The Washington Naval Treaty and London Naval Treaty limited new cruisers of their signatory nations to not more than a 10,000-ton displacement and 8-inch (20 cm) guns, but as a relatively minor naval power the Netherlands had not been party to the treaties and was not bound by their restrictions. According to Dutch naval intelligence, the Japanese cruisers did not participate in exercises with the main fleet of battleships and fleet carriers, instead operating with seaplane carriers, so it was assumed that the battlecruisers would not have to face overwhelming carrier-based air strikes. Moreover, the presence of these powerful ships—whose larger guns could easily out-range any escorting cruisers or destroyers—would give the Dutch a fleet in being in the East Indies that could delay or end plans for an amphibious assault for fear that the invasion would be disrupted or the attacking fleet destroyed.

== Design ==
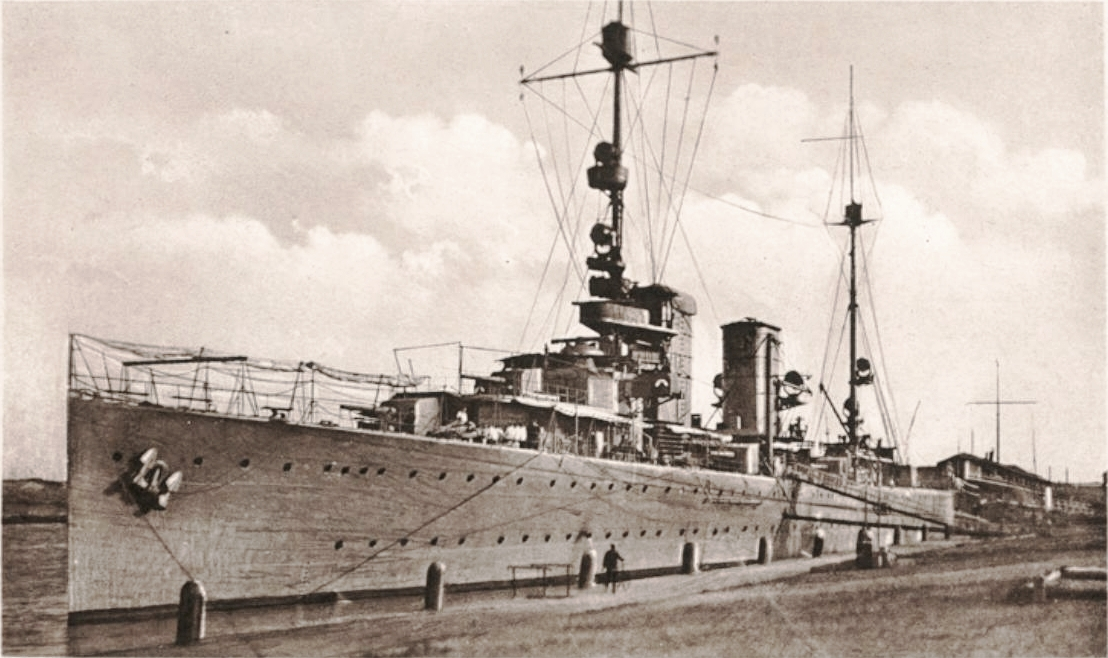
Java moored at Den Helder in 1925. The main defense of the East Indies was entrusted to this ship and her fellow cruisers from the 1920s to the Second World War.

In 1938, a number of high-ranking naval officers within the Koninklijke Marine gathered to discuss possible improvements to the navy. They concluded that the Dutch should have a navy strong enough to force an enemy to "use such a large part of his military potential that there would be an unacceptable weakening of his capabilities in other theaters". At this, and a note from the Chief of Naval Staff, the Minister of Defence J.C.C. van Dijk ordered the navy on 18 February 1939 to begin planning and estimating costs for two or possibly three battlecruisers. The ships formed a key part of a naval rearmament program which was generally called the "Dutch Battlecruiser Plan 1939". This was to also include the acquisition of at least two destroyers, seven submarines and several motor torpedo boats. Most of these vessels were to be deployed to the East Indies upon completion.

Requirements for the new battlecruiser design were laid down by the navy a day before the order from van Dijk was made; they included the ability to steam for 12 hours at 32 knots, an endurance of 4,500 nautical miles at 20 knots, a maximum of fifteen minutes for the ship to go from 20 to 30 knots, protection for the engine room that would allow the ship to take hits in that area without being slowed, a draft not to exceed 9 meters, and capacity for six weeks' worth of supplies. Desired weaponry was nine 280 mm guns in three triple turrets for the main armament, with each gun capable of firing independently, a dual-purpose secondary armament of 120 mm guns in four twin mounts, and an anti-aircraft battery of fourteen 40 mm guns in pairs with centralized fire control. Aircraft were to be two fighters and two reconnaissance aircraft. Specific values were given for each aspect of the design's armor, which featured substantial anti-torpedo and mine protection (Note: This included "anti-torpedo bulkheads extending to double bottom" that were "able to absorb 53 cm torpedo hits". See: Noot (1980), p. 243) and a defense against 28 cm shells and 300 kg bombs. (Note: Specific armor values were given in Noot (1980), p. 243; the following is directly quoted from him: Main belt from aft to forward turret: 250 mm; Remaining waterline belt: 80 mm; Main armored belt: 125 mm; Splinter deck on top of armored deck: 30 mm; Control tower: sides: 300 mm, roof: 150 mm; 28 cm turrets: barbette: 250 mm, front: 300 mm, roof: 150 mm, sides: 100 mm; 12 cm mounts: barbette: 80 mm, front: 80 mm, roof: 125 mm; to be protected against the effect of 200 kg aircraft bombs and 14 cm shell hits)

=== Preliminary designs ===
As 1913 plans for 24,650-ton dreadnoughts were never brought to fruition due to the First World War, (Note: No orders were placed nor were any plans for financing the battleships ever made, mostly due to the First World War. The ships were designed by foreign shipbuilders including Friedrich Krupp Germaniawerft, Blohm & Voss, and Vickers were invited to submit designs to specifications set by the government. See: Gardiner and Gray (1984), p. 366) the Dutch had no prior experience in building such large ships. Moreover, they lacked any significant source of information on more modern vessels; the only material available was unclassified and public sources like Jane's Fighting Ships. Facing these constraints, the Dutch turned to foreign sources for technical assistance.

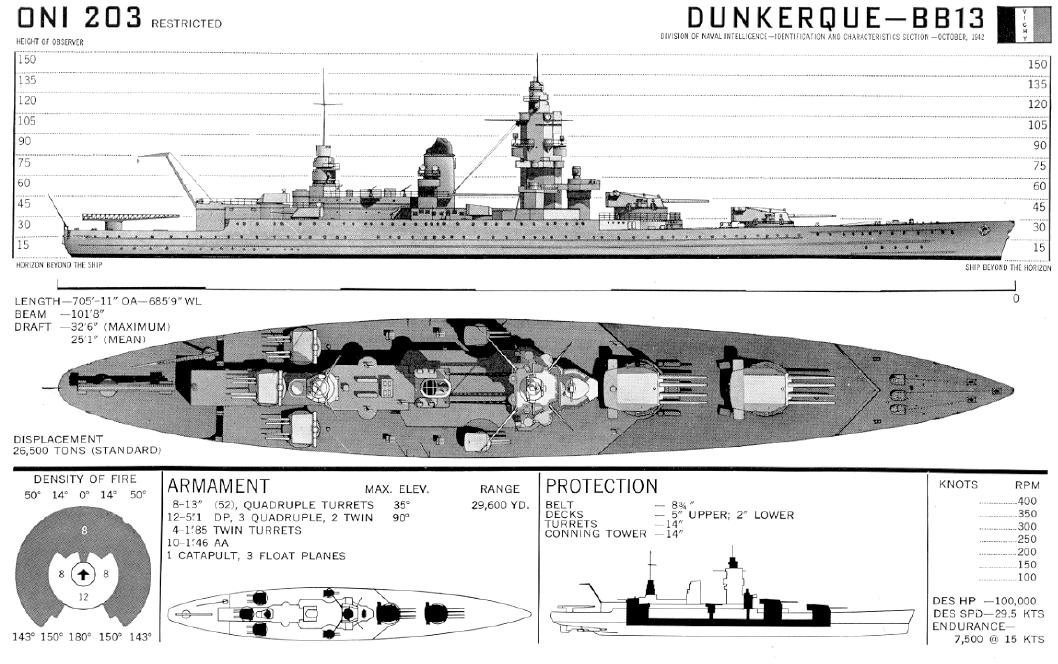
As the Dutch lacked the design experience necessary to produce a modern warship, they hoped that the French would release plans of the Dunkerque class (pictured) to them.

Although they hoped that the French would release plans for their Dunkerque class of 'fast battleships', they decided to focus their effort on Hitler's Germany. Informal talks had already been held in Berlin on 24–25 April 1939 where the Dutch proposed that, in return for the complete plans for the Scharnhorst-class battleship, they would order all of the necessary equipment for their construction program from Germany.

A draft design was completed without foreign assistance by the Construction Department on 11 July 1939, (Note: Noot (1980), p. 247 in Table 1 give the characteristics of this preliminary design as follows: Displacement: 26,000 t; Draft: 7.45 m; Machinery: Eight boilers (4 × 2), four propellers, 160,000 shp able to push the ship at 33 kn; Endurance: 4500 nmi at 20 kn; Side belt: 250 mm tapering upwards to 150 mm and 100 mm; Side belt forward and aft: 100 mm; Main traverse bulkheads: not indicated; Main Armored deck: 125 mm; Upper deck: 15 mm; 28 cm turrets: barbette: 250 mm, front: 300 mm, roof: 130 mm, sides: 100 mm; Underwater protection: double bottom, depth of 100 mm, depth of side protection system: 700 mm, depth of main side belt: 600 mm, longitudinal anti-torpedo bulkheads: 30 mm, one on each side of the ship; Armament was the same as the preliminary and final designs; Two aircraft) but it did not reflect the numerous technical developments that had entered capital ship designs after the First World War. In particular, its armor scheme was utterly obsolete, as it lacked any substantial amount of deck armor or good underwater protection; it came closer to the designs of 20 to 25 years previous than to that of a modern warship.

Despite German interest in the battlecruiser project, the two sides could not agree on terms. The German delegation insisted that orders placed in their country be guaranteed, with financial compensation to be paid to German companies if the Dutch did not construct the ships. They also refused to release a complete set of plans for the Scharnhorsts. Further complicating negotiations, the Dutch Cabinet, which would have to approve any deal, did not convene during the summer of 1939.

While awaiting official approval, Dutch planning went ahead. A contract with Ferrostaal A.G. Essen was drawn up, and on 15 May 1939 a list of products for purchase in Germany was submitted. (Note: Noot (1980), p. 249 gives a full list: 37,500 tons of armor, which would be delivered between June 1940 and January 1944 (the majority of this to be delivered prior to January 1943); 18,000 tons of construction material, to be delivered June 1940 through June 1943 (the majority of this to be delivered prior to January 1942); Nine 28 cm triple turrets and twelve 12 cm twin mounts, to be delivered from spring to late 1943; Ammunition for both the 28 cm and 12 cm guns, to be delivered from late 1943 through late 1944; Six catapults, to be delivered from July 1943 through late 1944; Propeller shafts, to be delivered from late 1941 through late 1943; Equipment for the propulsion plant, to be delivered from 1940 through 1942; 15,000 tons of steel for the construction of a floating dry dock, to be delivered during 1942) Two months later, talks were held in Bremen and Berlin (on 13 and 31 July, respectively) in which the Germans agreed to release plans and drawings that, although not specifically of the Scharnhorst-class, would reveal their ideas on battlecruiser design. Delivered on 21 August 1939, these showed various modern protection schemes that could be used in the new battlecruisers. On 4 October, a German admiral previously appointed as a liaison between the two navies asserted that while Germany could not guarantee punctual delivery dates, it could assure the Netherlands that it would pressure the companies to meet the contractual dates and that the Kriegsmarine would not interfere with orders from the same companies. A month later, Ferrostaal A.G. Essen was formally appointed as the Dutch proxy in most of their dealings with Germany; this appointment did not include Germaniawerft.

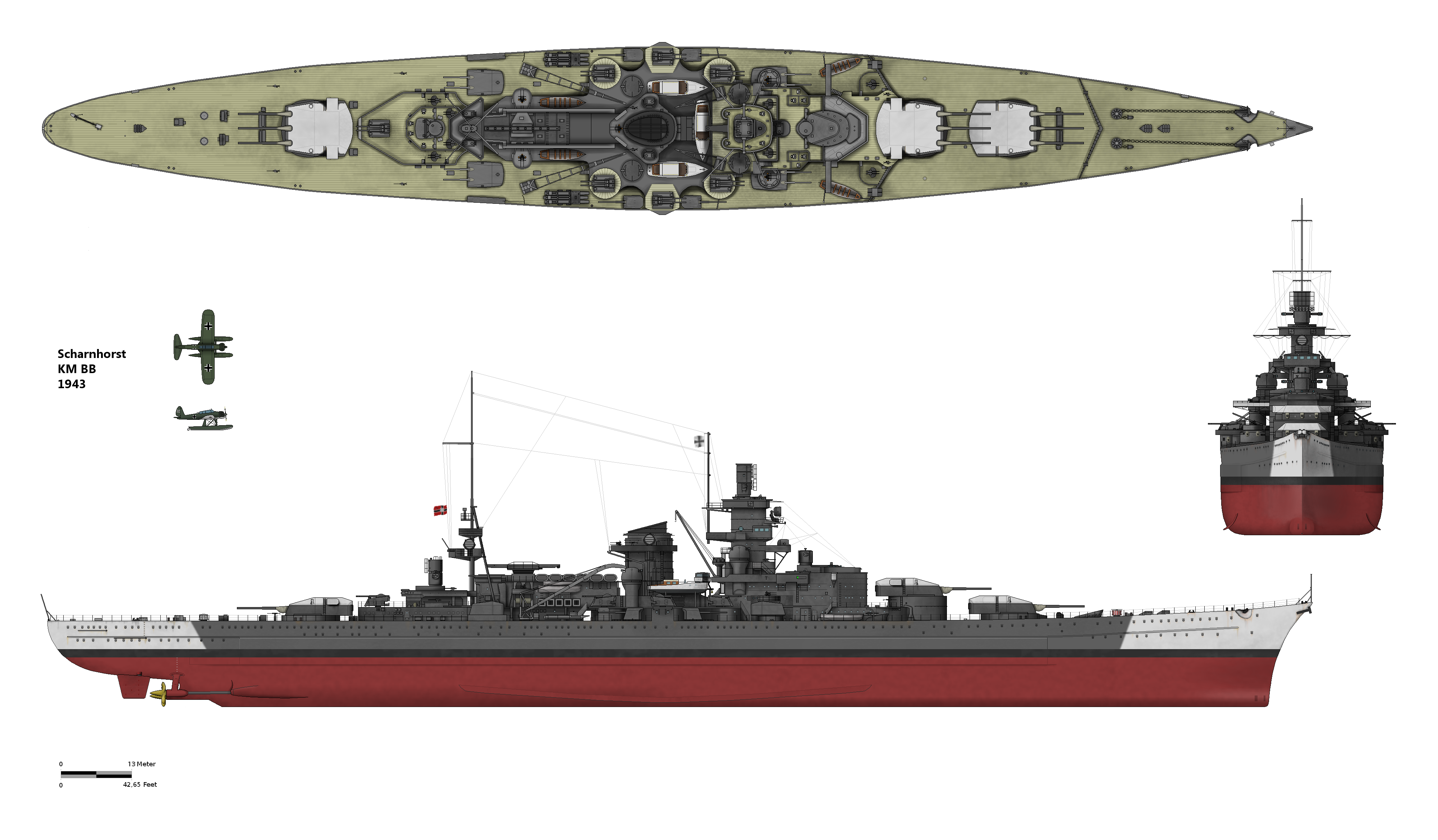
The design of the 1047s was based on the German Scharnhorst class; this three-view drawing depicts Scharnhorst in December 1943.

Work on armament for the new designs was contracted to Germaniawerft; the Dutch met with the company on 31 July 1939 and supplied the characteristics for the main and secondary armament. Turret armor, main armament depression and elevation (10–45°, obtained through the use of hydraulics), and the muzzle velocity for the guns (850–900 m/s (2,800–3,000 ft/s)) were all specified. Requirements for the secondary armament included a maximum depression of 10°, a maximum elevation of 80°, and approximate armor values for their mounts (80 mm front, 150 mm roof, 50 mm sides). The fire control arrangement was discussed on 6 November 1939 with the Dutch company NV Hazemeyer Signaal Apparatenfabriek.

By this time the propulsion plant, which was to be built in the Netherlands, was taking shape. Requirements sent out in August 1939 mandated that the ships have eight boiler rooms, four sets of geared turbines, and 180,000 shp. After further improvements, Nevesbu and two German firms (Germaniawerft was responsible for the turbines and Deschimag for the boilers) began sketching preliminary plans. These were then incorporated into two different design studies, one by Nevesbu and the other by NV Ingenieurskantoor voor Scheepsbouw (IvS). IvS was purportedly a Dutch company linking Dutch and German designers, but in reality functioned as a front company for German interests. Their design was probably based upon a set of plans drawn up by the Ship Construction Office of the German Navy and received in the Netherlands on 31 August. It did not give the propulsion machinery enough space, and it was thought that this design did not provide enough room for magazines. Nevertheless, it was taken into discussions with the Dutch, where the 11 July design was merged with it. IvS came out with one further plan on 11 March 1940, the merits of which were discussed with the Dutch in April of that year.

=== Design studies ===
In December 1939 the two studies produced their design proposals; both were capable of 180,000 shp and both had similar boiler capabilities, but the Dutch design was 199 m^{2} (2,140 sq ft) larger than the German. (Note: The Dutch design took up 1,209 m^{2} (13,010 sq ft), while the German design took up 910 m^{2} (9,800 sq ft). See: Noot (1980), p. 253) Although it had the advantage of smaller size, the Dutch were concerned that the German design's power plant might not be capable of operating without problems (the Kriegsmarine did indeed face plant problems during the war). However, questions about reliability soon became moot; it was originally believed that around 84 m (276 ft) of the ship's length would be required for its propulsion plant, but it was discovered that no more than 72.8 m (239 ft) could be spared if the ship's ammunition was to be behind armor—and the German design needed 74 m (243 ft), while the Dutch design needed 78 m (256 ft).

December also saw real doubts start to creep over the project, as a new Navy Minister had been appointed, and he believed that the Dutch would be better off acquiring a modern version of the old armored cruiser type. Basic characteristics were drawn up for a 29 kn (33 mph; 54 km/h), 16,000-long-ton (16,257 t; 17,920-short-ton) standard ship that had nine 24 cm (9.4 in) guns, a 175 mm (6.9 in) belt and a 75 mm (3.0 in) deck. Even though these vessels would have been superior to any 20 cm (8 in)-gunned, 10,000-long-ton (10,000 t; 11,000-short-ton) treaty cruiser, it was felt that too many compromises would be necessary. The belt and deck armor were judged inadequate, but to achieve the same protection as the battlecruiser design would mean no armament could be fitted. The smaller design also did not feature the speed advantage over opponents that the battlecruisers had. For these reasons the Navy "strongly recommended against the construction of such a ship", and the proposal was abandoned.

The plan for three battlecruisers was authorized in February 1940; they, along with two light cruisers of the Eendracht class, would be responsible for the main sea defense of the East Indies. The new light cruisers would replace the older Java class, which would then assume the role of gunnery training ships from grossly obsolete ships such as the protected cruiser De Gelderland, which had been laid down more than forty years prior. The authorization of large battlecruisers meant that a new 40,000-ton floating dock would be built and many improvements to their planned base in the East Indies, the naval yard in Soerabaya, would begin. To construct such a ship, a new 250 m (820 ft) building way was begun by the Netherlands Construction Company, Ltd.

Germany's refusal to give the Dutch access to plans detailing the design of the Scharnhorsts below the waterline was a major problem. Inexperienced in designing an underwater protection scheme for a ship of this size, the Dutch were forced to turn to Italy for assistance, which allowed a delegation of engineers and naval officers to enter the country in February 1940. While the Dutch delegation was barred from viewing technical drawings of the under-construction battleship Roma, possibly to ensure that the details of their Pugliese system remained a secret, they were given access to the completed Vittorio Veneto, toured several shipyards, interviewed the Chief Constructor of the Italian Navy, and received additional information on the Scharnhorsts (as the Italians—Germany's ally—knew some details of the ships).

Although the issues the Dutch designers were having with their propulsion system were discussed, the delegation came away from Italy entirely uninspired by the Italians' efforts in that area. On the other hand, the visit provoked a drastic reworking of the internal subdivision of the proposed battlecruisers. The designers got rid of the previously required central longitudinal bulkhead and attempted to raise the double bottom to provide greater protection against magnetic torpedoes. Due to the requirement for a shallow draft, this modification had to be abandoned.

=== Last design ===
When another delegation was sent to Germany to discuss the problems with the battlecruisers, the Dutch took their evolving design with them. Dated 19 April 1940, this was the final version prior to the invasion of the Netherlands by Germany; Design 1047 was never fully completed. The normal load displacement was now planned to be around 28,482 tonnes (28,032 long tons). Although the propulsion was not yet finalized, the requirements had been re-examined in March 1940 to ascertain if 160,000 shp would be enough, taking into account that a plant that would produce 180,000 shp in tropical water would in northern regions produce ca. 200,000 shp—warmer waters adversely affect a steam turbine's efficiency. The updated requirements also called for eight Yarrow boilers fitted in four boiler rooms, and four Parsons geared turbines in two engine rooms, to drive four propellers at either 40,000 or 45,000 shp each (40,000 in tropic water conditions, 45,000 in North Sea conditions). Length requirements for the machinery had also been altered, once in early March and again on 20 April 1940; a total length of 79.5 meters was now called for.

=== Armament ===
The main guns of Scharnhorst. The turrets and guns of the 1047s would have closely resembled these.

The table of characteristics provided by Lt. Jurrien S. Noot for the 19 April 1940 design does not give any armament specifics, as these likely remained unaltered from the earlier 16 February 1940 drawing. That drawing provided the following: a main armament of nine 283 mm guns, a secondary armament of twelve 120 mm dual purpose guns, and an anti-aircraft defense consisting of fourteen Bofors 40 mm guns and eight Oerlikon 20 mm cannons.

Work on the main armament was contracted to Germaniawerft, which based its designs for the turrets, mountings, and guns of the 1047s on the 28 cm SK C/34 used on the Scharnhorst class. With a 315 kg (694 lb) APC shell, the guns would have had a muzzle velocity of 900 m/s (2,950 ft/s) and a maximum range of 42,600 meters (46,600 yards); 120 rounds of ammunition would have been stowed for each gun, and the rate of fire would have been about 2.5 rounds per minute. The guns would have been able to be elevated to a maximum angle of 45° and trained to 150°, while the loading angle would have been about 2°.

Secondary armament was planned to be twelve Bofors 120 mm (4.7 in) guns in dual mounts. It is unclear whether or not these were intended to be an older version of the gun (which had been mounted as the main armament on Dutch destroyers since the 1920s) or an entirely new version. Detailed specifics such as range or rate of fire are also unknown; had the older gun been used it would in any case have been updated (including the use of dual instead of single half-shield mounts), and the more modern version did not see service until 1950, by which time it incorporated improvements from lessons learned during the war.

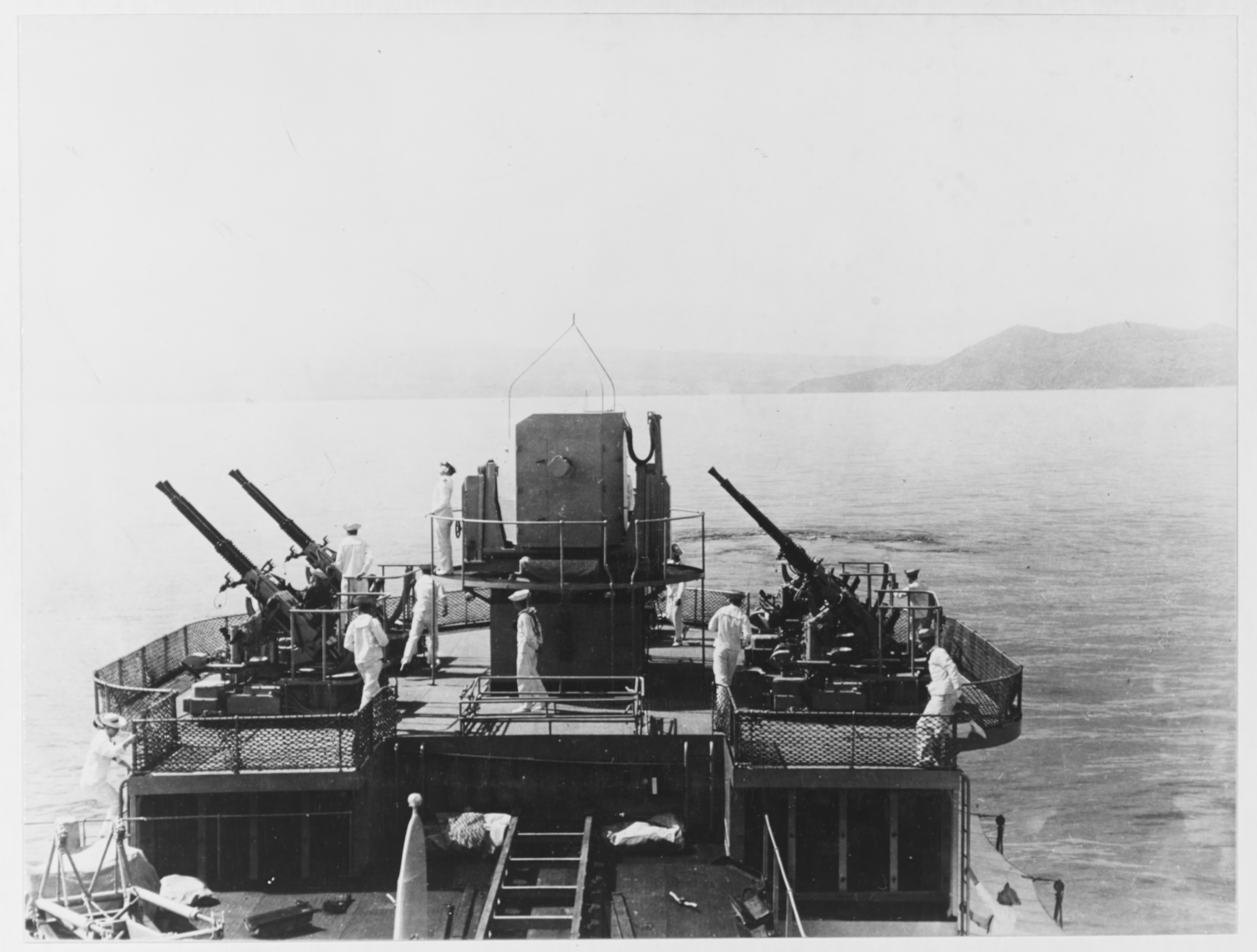
40 mm guns seen on the after superstructure of De Ruyter in 1939. It was planned that the 1047s would carry 14 of these weapons in dual mounts.

Close-in anti-aircraft defense would have been provided by 40 mm and 20 mm guns. Arguably the best light anti-aircraft gun of the Second World War, the 40 mm Bofors was used for air defense both on land and at sea by many of the countries involved, including the Americans, British, Dutch, Japanese, and Swedish. Produced in the early 1930s, it first entered service with the Royal Netherlands Navy when the cruisers Java and Sumatra were refitted in 1934–35.

=== Differences from the Scharnhorst class ===
Despite their superficially similar appearance, there were many differences between the Scharnhorst class and the final incarnation of the Dutch design. The 1047 was inferior in its armor protection, but in other respects was far superior: the main guns could be elevated 5° higher, the anti-torpedo system was thicker, the deck protection better accommodated the ship boilers, the quadruple-screw design increased redundancy, and the design did not make use of the problematic German high-pressure power plant. In addition, the 1047s' secondary armament of twelve 120 mm (4.7 in) dual purpose guns was far superior to the Scharnhorst class, which was divided between 150 mm (5.9 in) anti-surface guns and 105 mm (4.1 in) anti-aircraft guns. The 1047s' guns would have been more effective because they saved needed space and weight on the ships while simplifying logistics by requiring just one size of secondary ammunition.

== Fate ==
Twice in its history did the Netherlands navy plan the construction of capital ships. In both cases this occurred immediately prior to the outbreak of world wars.

With the outbreak of the Second World War, almost all design work was halted, although work on turrets and gunnery arrangements by Germaniawerft's designers continued until the German invasion of the Netherlands in May. The first 1047-class ship was scheduled to be completed in 1944, so would in any case have been too late to stop the Japanese advance into the Dutch East Indies. Due to the war, final plans for the ships were never completed, and the ships were never constructed.

== See also ==
- Dutch 1913 battleship proposal
- Dutch Empire

== Bibliography ==
- Breyer, Siegfried (1973). Battleships and Battle Cruisers, 1905–1970. Garden City, New York: Doubleday. ISBN 978-0-385-07247-2. OCLC 702840.
- Gardiner, Robert; Chesneau, Roger, eds. (1980). Conway's All the World's Fighting Ships 1922–1946. Annapolis, Maryland: Naval Institute Press. ISBN 978-0-87021-913-9. OCLC 18121784.
- Gardiner, Robert; Gray, Randal, eds. (1985). Conway's All the World's Fighting Ships 1906–1921. Annapolis, Maryland: Naval Institute Press. ISBN 978-0-87021-907-8. OCLC 12119866.
- Garzke, William H.; Dulin, Robert O. (1980). Battleships: Axis and Neutral battleships in World War II. Annapolis, Maryland: Naval Institute Press. ISBN 978-0-87021-101-0. OCLC 12613723.
- Morison, Samuel Eliot (1948). The Rising Sun in the Pacific; 1931–April 1942. History of United States Naval Operations in World War II. Boston, Massachusetts: Little, Brown and Company. ISBN 978-0-252-06973-4. OCLC 7361008.
- Noot, Lt. Jurrien S. (1980). "Battlecruiser: Design studies for the Royal Netherlands Navy 1939–40". Warship International. 3: 242–273.
- Spek, John D. (1988). "The Dutch Naval Shipbuilding Program of 1939". Warship International. 25 (1): 68–83. JSTOR 44889211.
- Worth, Richard (2002). Fleets of World War II. Cambridge, Massachusetts: Da Capo Press. ISBN 978-0-306-81116-6. OCLC 48806166.
