= Austrått Fort =

Coastal fort in Ørland, Norway

Coordinates: 63.708301°N 9.722031°E

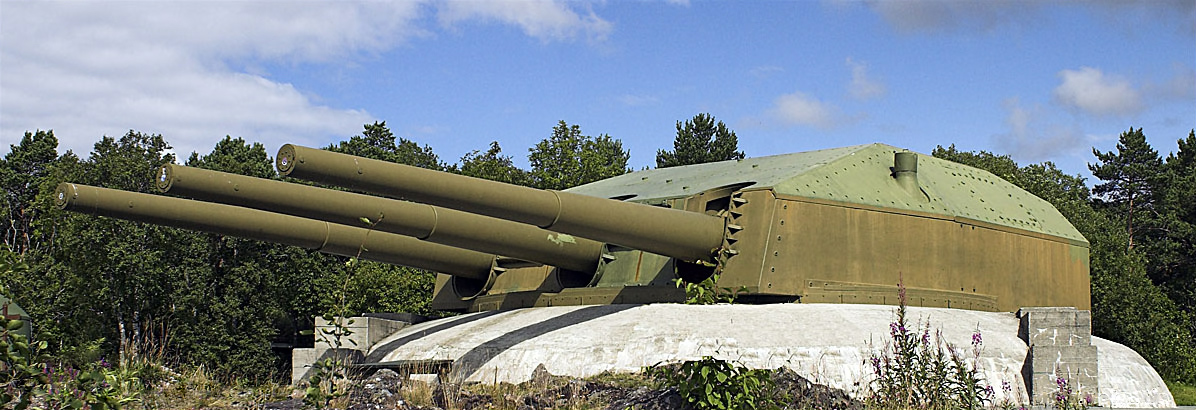
Triple 28cm (11-inch) turret Caesar (2010).

Austrått Fort is a disused coastal artillery site located at Austrått in Ørland Municipality in Trøndelag county, Norway. It was constructed in 1942 by the German Wehrmacht to protect the Trondheimsfjord during the German occupation of Norway during World War II. The fort's centrepiece is a triple 28 cm SK C/34 (11-inch) gun turret from the German battleship Gneisenau, which was damaged in Kiel by British aerial attack. The three-gun turret weighs 800 tons and was capable of firing 730-pound shells 38 kilometres (24 mi). The last firing took place in 1953 and the fort was decommissioned in 1968. It opened as a museum in 1991.

Like its sister battery, the Fjell Fortress on Sotra Island near Bergen, a shaft was cut out of the rocks for the huge former Gneisenau battleship gun turret. The triple 28 cm SK C/34 turret became available after the discontinuation of the Kriegsmarine battleships building programme in 1942. Turret Anton was split up in three separate barrels and placed at Fort Rozenburg in the Netherlands. Turret Bruno was installed in a shaft on Sotra, Norway. Turret Caesar was emplaced halfway up occupied Norway. About 650 Yugoslavian slave laborers, mostly Serbs (Partisans and Chetniks) worked under awful conditions on the tunnels and bunkers around the hill. In a short time, a large underground system with supporting bunkers was finished. In August 1943 the guns were test-fired. No real engagements occurred during the remainder of the war, however.

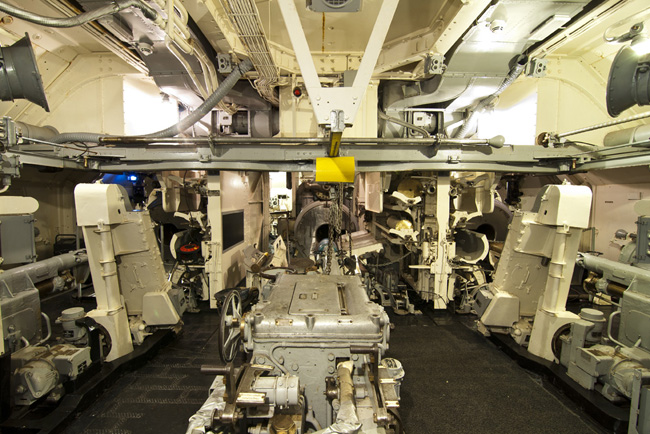
Interior of triple 28cm turret from Gneisenau in MKB Ørlandet, also known as Austrått Fort, Norway (2011).

The underground barracks and turret shaft with its ammunition rooms are open to the public. Because the Norwegians kept the site in operating condition until 1968, it remains in a good state of preservation. Today it is one of the most complete examples of a World War II German coastal battery extant.

In addition, the site still has its infantry defenses consisting of trenches and a recently renovated 4.7 cm Czech-made anti-tank gun in working condition. The gun covers an anti-tank wall through the woods intended to protect the entrance of the complex.

== See also ==
- Oscarsborg Fortress
