= Ministry of Defence (Norway) =

Government ministry of Norway

Coordinates: 59°54′24.29″N 10°44′33.48″E

- Det kongelige forsvarsdepartement Det kongelege forsvarsdepartement

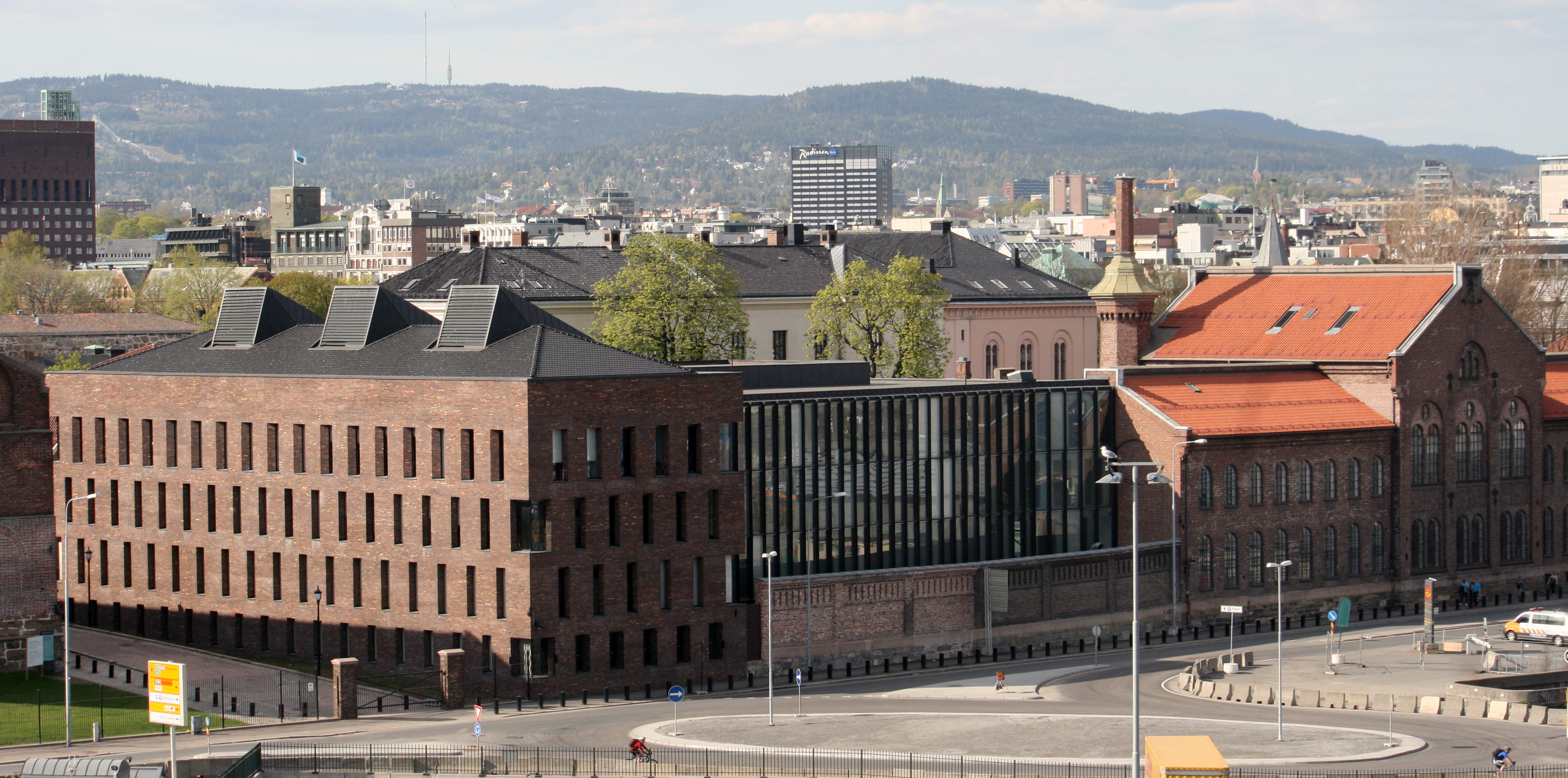

Agency overview
- Formed: September 30, 1814; 211 years ago
- Preceding agencies: Ministry of the Army; Ministry of the Navy
- Jurisdiction: Government of Norway
- Headquarters: Glacisgata 1, Oslo, Norway
- Annual budget: Nok.60 million (2009/10)
- Agency executives: Tore O. Sandvik, Minister of Defence; Øystein Bø, State Secretary; Erik Lund-Isaksen, Secretary General
- Child agency: National Security Authority Norwegian Defence Research Establishment Norwegian Defence Estates Agency
- Website: http://www.regjeringen.no/en/dep/fd.html?id=380

The Royal Norwegian Ministry of Defence (Norwegian: Det kgl. Forsvarsdepartement) is a Norwegian government ministry in charge of the formation and implementation of national security and defence policy, and for the overall management and control of the activities of subordinate agencies. The ministry is located at Glacisgata 1, Oslo, inside Akershus festning. The ministry is headed by the politically appointed Minister of Defence, currently Tore O. Sandvik. The ministry controls a large group of defence-related agencies, not to be related with Ministry of Foreign Affairs that controls all intelligence-related agencies in the country.

== Core tasks ==
- Strategic analysis, research and development (R&D)
- The development of long-term policy including future strategic concepts and doctrines
- Perspective and structural planning
- Planning, budgeting and implementation in the medium and short term
- Overall management of agencies' activities during the budget year
- Operational policy, planning and management at a strategic level
- Exercise policy, planning and management at a strategic level
- Emergency planning, policy and management at a strategic level
- Crisis management
- Development and implementation of security policy, both nationally and internationally
- Development of defence cooperation with allied- and partner countries
- Strategic personnel management
- Information, communication and press relations
- Strategic leadership and management in the field of ICT
- Organisational development
- Preventive security at a strategic level
- Legal questions
- Controller / Internal audit
- Internal administration

== Departments ==
- Executive Secretariat

On behalf of the Secretary General, the secretariat prepares, quality-assures, coordinates and priorities all issues that are submitted to the Minister. Accordingly, the secretariat maintains overall responsibility for the Minister's activities.

- The Ministry of Defence Communications Unit

The unit provides support both to the Minister and senior staff, both political and administrative, and to the Chief of Defence. The spokesman function is performed by separate spokesmen for the Minister of Defence and the Chief of Defence.

- Internal Auditor Unit

The Internal Auditor will contribute to the overall achievement of defence objectives by providing support to the Ministry's senior management in controlling and managing subordinate departments and agencies.

- The Department of Personnel and General Services

The Department of Personnel and General Services spans over a range of different professional areas, some administrative and some more related to aspects of development. Some of the department's tasks are purely internal while others, for example personnel policy and common legal services, entail responsibilities across the sector as a whole.

- The Department of Security Policy

The Department of Security Policy is responsible for the handling of questions of security policy as well as for the Ministry's international activities and external relations in the field of security policy.

- The Department of Management and Financial Governance

The Department of Management and Financial Governance has the overall responsibility for the planning and development of activities, the organisation and the structure of the Armed Forces within the particular long-term planning period. The department also exercises overall management and control of the activities of subordinate agencies.

- The Department of Defence Policy and Long-Term Planning

The Department of Defence Policy and Long-Term Planning is responsible for strategic analysis, the development of long-term defence policy and overall planning for the defence sector.

== See also ==
- List of Norwegian Ministers of Defence
- Norwegian Armed Forces
