= Fjell Fortress =

Fort in Fjell, Hordaland, Norway

Coordinates: 60°19′30″N 5°04′56″E

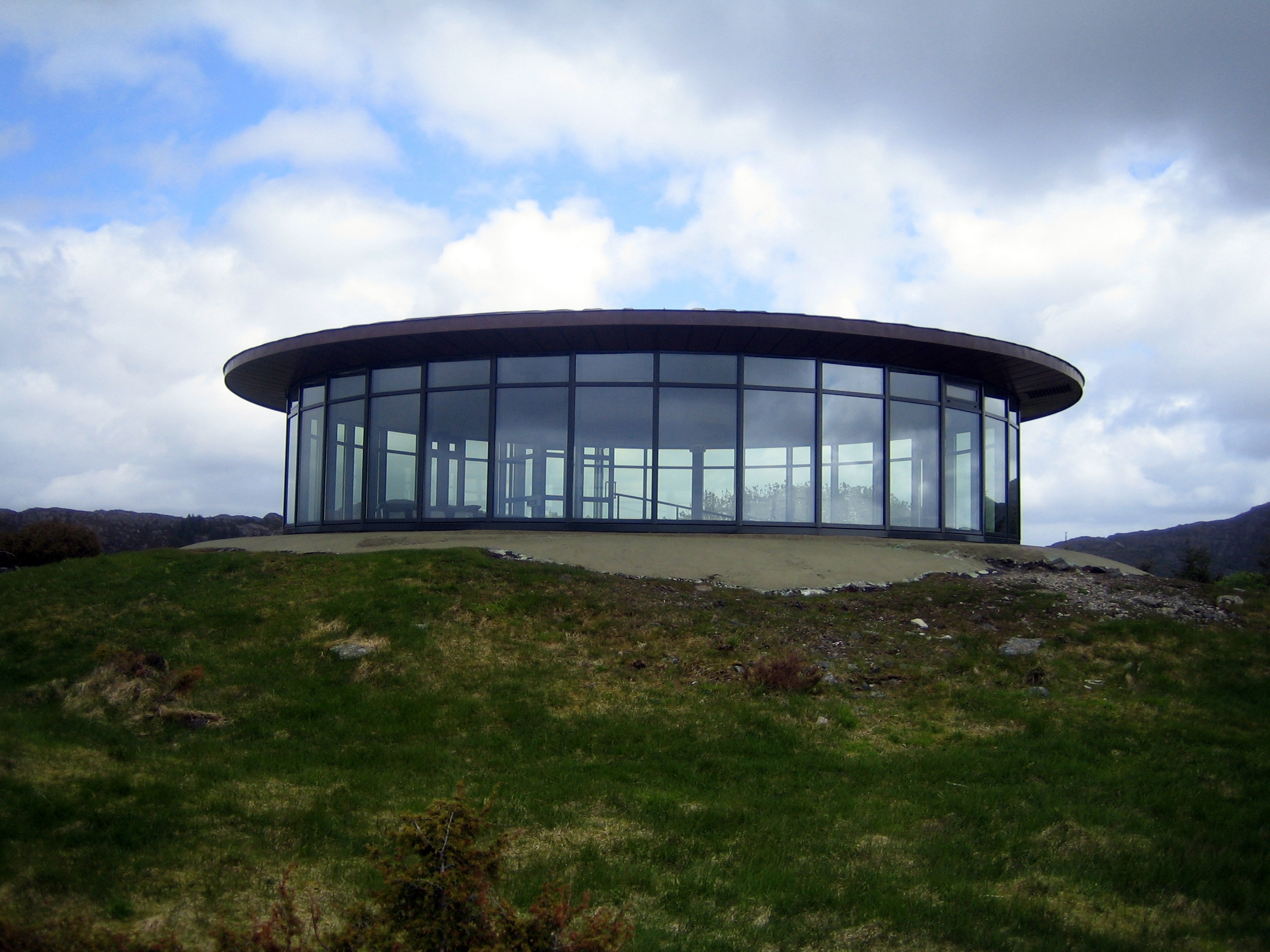
The gun emplacement has today a protective cover, which houses a café. The area around the emplacement has been changed a lot from what it looked like originally. Today, it is not representative for what it looked like during the years when the gun was mounted.

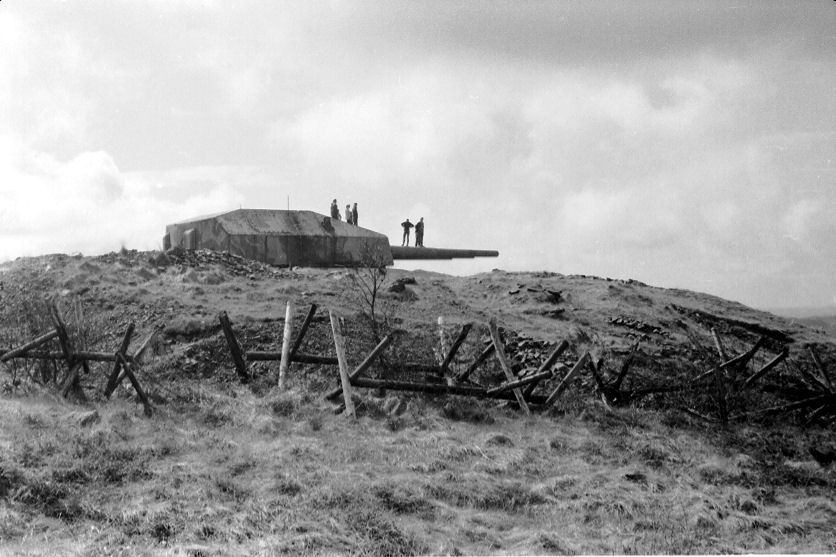
The turret from Gneisenau with its three 28-cm guns in 1963.

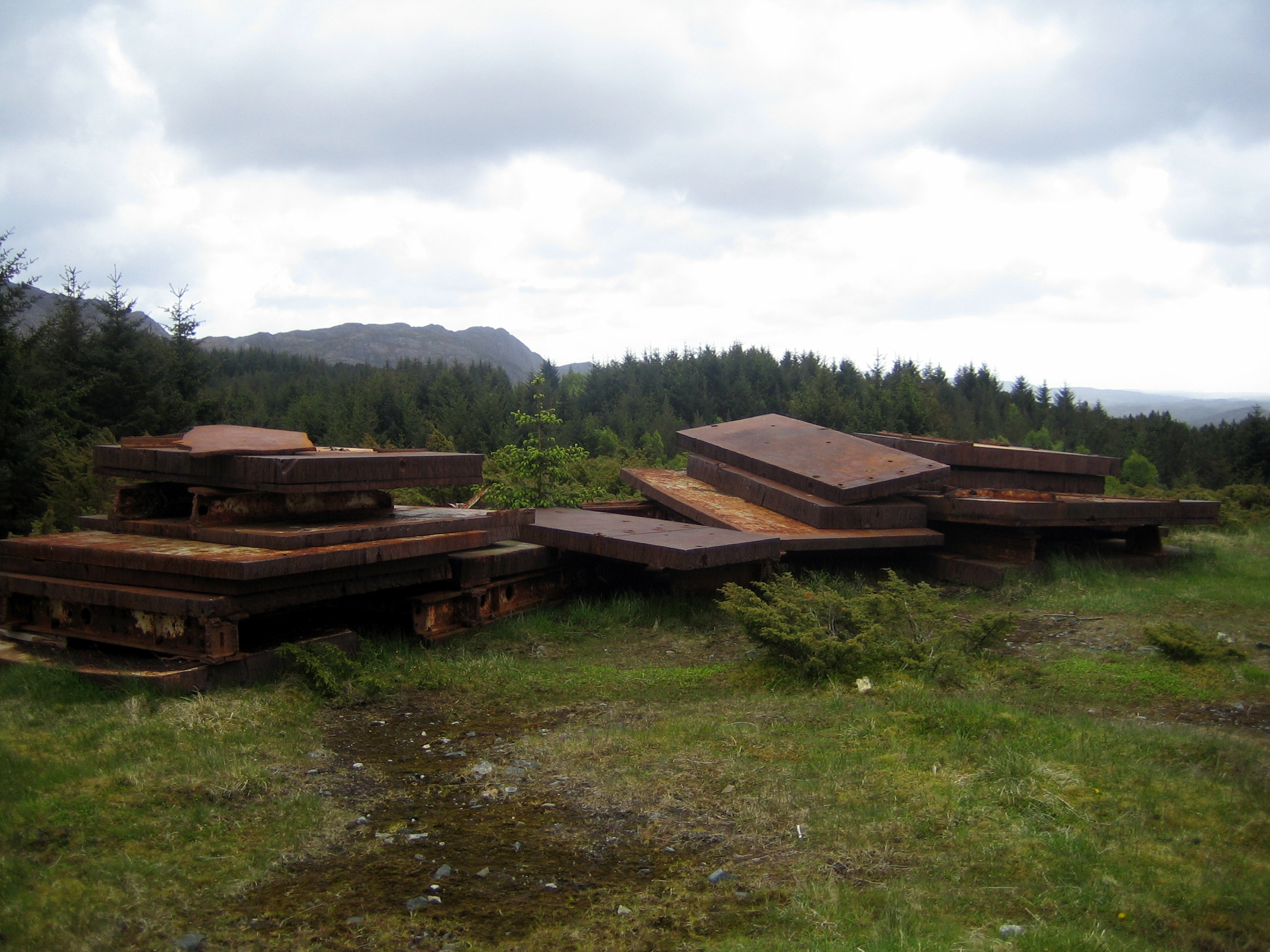
Remains from the armour placed in addition to the already existing turret-armor, when the gun was placed at Fjell.

Fjell Fortress ([fjɛl]; Norwegian: Fjell festning, German: Festung Fjell), known during World War II as Marine-Küsten-Batterie 11./504 ('Marine Coastal Battery 11/504') is located on the island of Sotra in Øygarden Municipality in Vestland county, Norway (it was part of Fjell Municipality in Hordaland county during World War II).

== History ==
The fortress was built by the German occupation forces during the Second World War. The construction works were commenced late summer 1942, and completed so far that they could fire the main gun for the first time as early as in June–July 1943. The fort was a significant link in the coastal defence of Norway. Its main commission was to intercept the seaward approach to Bergen.

The main gun was also to a certain extent employed in the interception of foreign aircraft raids against Bergen.

The fortress has areas over and under the ground, with a network of tunnels two miles long on the surface and in the mountains. The fortress area is today the property of the Norwegian Armed Forces, while Stiftelsen Fjell festning are responsible for conducting the preservation and maintenance.

After sending a petition, the municipal authorities was offered by the Norwegian Armed Forces, represented by Skifte Eiendom (the Norwegian Armed Forces's property management), to take possession of the fortress area without compensation. The offer was rejected by the municipal authorities. The future fate of Fjell Fortress thus remains uncertain as of 2008.

== The main gun turret ==
To mount the main gun turret at the fortress, it was necessary to dig 17 metres vertically into the mountain. This was considered a time-consuming task, so the main entrance and gun emplacement were constructed as an open ditch, and later covered with concrete, instead of blasting a tunnel into and down in the solid rock. As a result, water entering the tunnel system has been a problem ever since the tunnel was constructed.

The work was mainly carried out by prisoners from eastern Europe, but also Norwegian prisoners participated. 25 prisoners died during the construction works, either as a result of frostbite, exhaustion or execution.

The 28 cm SK C/34 naval gun turret was taken from battery Bruno of the battleship Gneisenau. It had three barrels, 28.3 centimetres each, and a range of 41 kilometres (25 mi), from Fedje in the north to Stolmen in the south - but this was with the greatest possible charge. Each barrel fired 3 shells at full charge, this caused an earth quake, shattered all windows in Fjell and flattened some barns. The guns were never fired at full charge again, so under a reduced charge the correct range at Fjell would be around 37 km. The guns originally weighed 600 tons, the armour was increased to a total weight of 1,000 tonnes (980 long tons; 1,100 short tons).
