= 28 cm SK C/34 naval gun =

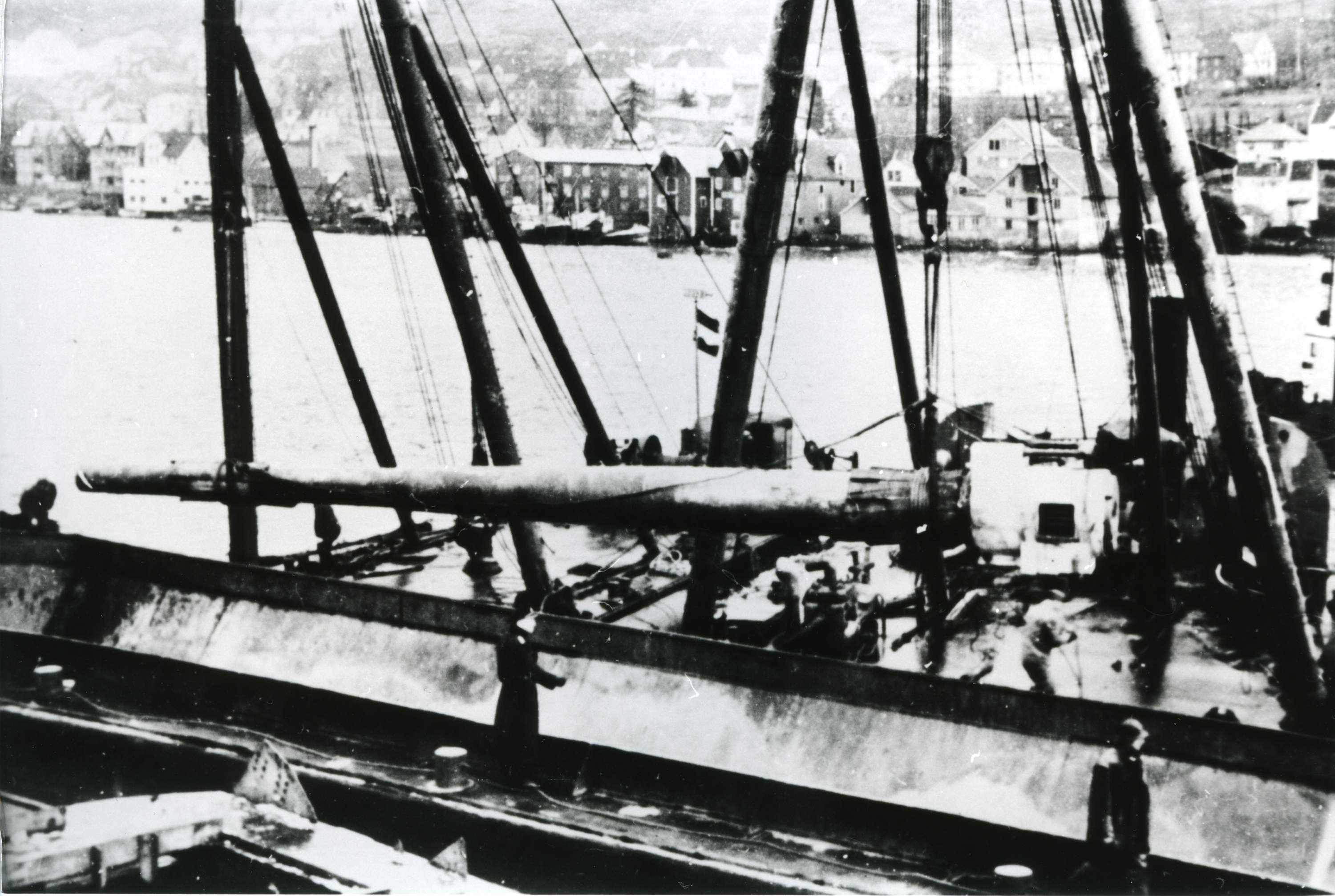
- Gun from Gneisenau being unloaded in Bergen, Norway, prior to installation at Fjell festning, late 1942-early 1943
- Type: Naval gun Coast-defense gun
- Place of origin: Germany

Service history
- In service: 1938–1953
- Wars: World War II

Production history
- Designed: 1934

Specifications
- Mass: 53,250 kg (117,400 lb)
- Length: 15.4 m (51 ft) 54.5 Caliber
- Barrel length: 14.5 m (48 ft) (bore length)
- Shell: Separate-loading, bagged charge
- Caliber: 283 mm (11.1 in)
- Elevation: –8° to +40°
- Muzzle velocity: 890 m/s (2,900 ft/s)
- Maximum firing range: 40,930 m (44,760 yd) at 40°

The German 28 cm SK C/34 (Note: SK - Schnelladekanone (quick loading cannon); C - Construktionsjahr (year of design)) naval gun was a 283 mm 54.5-caliber built-up gun designed in 1934 used on the Scharnhorst-class battleships.

== History ==
The previous 28 cm gun was the SK C/28 used on the Deutschland class. The Scharnhorst class received an improved version of the SK C/28 which had a longer barrel—the SK C/34.

The 283 mm SK C/34 gun was relatively fast loading, compared with other armament of this size. It could deliver a shot every 17 seconds. The ballistic properties of the guns made them effective against the new French Dunkerque class, which had an armored belt 225–283 mm, barbettes of 310–340 mm, at standard fighting distances.

An improved version of the gun was planned to be mounted on the Netherlands' Design 1047 battlecruisers, but the ships were never begun due to the start of the Second World War.

When Gneisenau's turrets were removed for re-arming and upgunning to 38 cm in 1942–43, her guns were redeployed for coast defence at Fjell festning ´(11.MAA 504) in Sotra, Norway (Bruno turret), at Batterie Oerlandat (4.MAA 507) in Austrått, Norway (Cesar turret), and guns from Anton turret were installed at Battery Rozenburg in the Netherlands.

One of Gneisenau's turrets and its guns were also considered for the hypothetical Landkreuzer P. 1000 Ratte super-heavy tank.

== Characteristics ==
Effectiveness of the guns against armor in different situations
Distance	0	7,900 m (8,600 yd)	15,100 m (16,500 yd)	18,288 m (20,000 yd)	27,432 m (30,000 yd)
Shooting angle[deg]	0	3.3	7.4	9.7	18.7
Shell hitting angle[deg]	0	4.4	10.3	15.2	30.2
Shell velocity at target	890 m/s (2,900 ft/s)	693 m/s (2,270 ft/s)	552 m/s (1,810 ft/s)	496 m/s (1,630 ft/s)	420 m/s (1,400 ft/s)
Side armor belt penetration	604 mm (23.8 in)	460 mm (18 in)	335 mm (13.2 in)	291 mm (11.5 in)	205 mm (8.1 in)
Deck armor penetration	-	19 mm (0.75 in)	41 mm (1.6 in)	48 mm (1.9 in)	76 mm (3.0 in)

== Ammunition ==
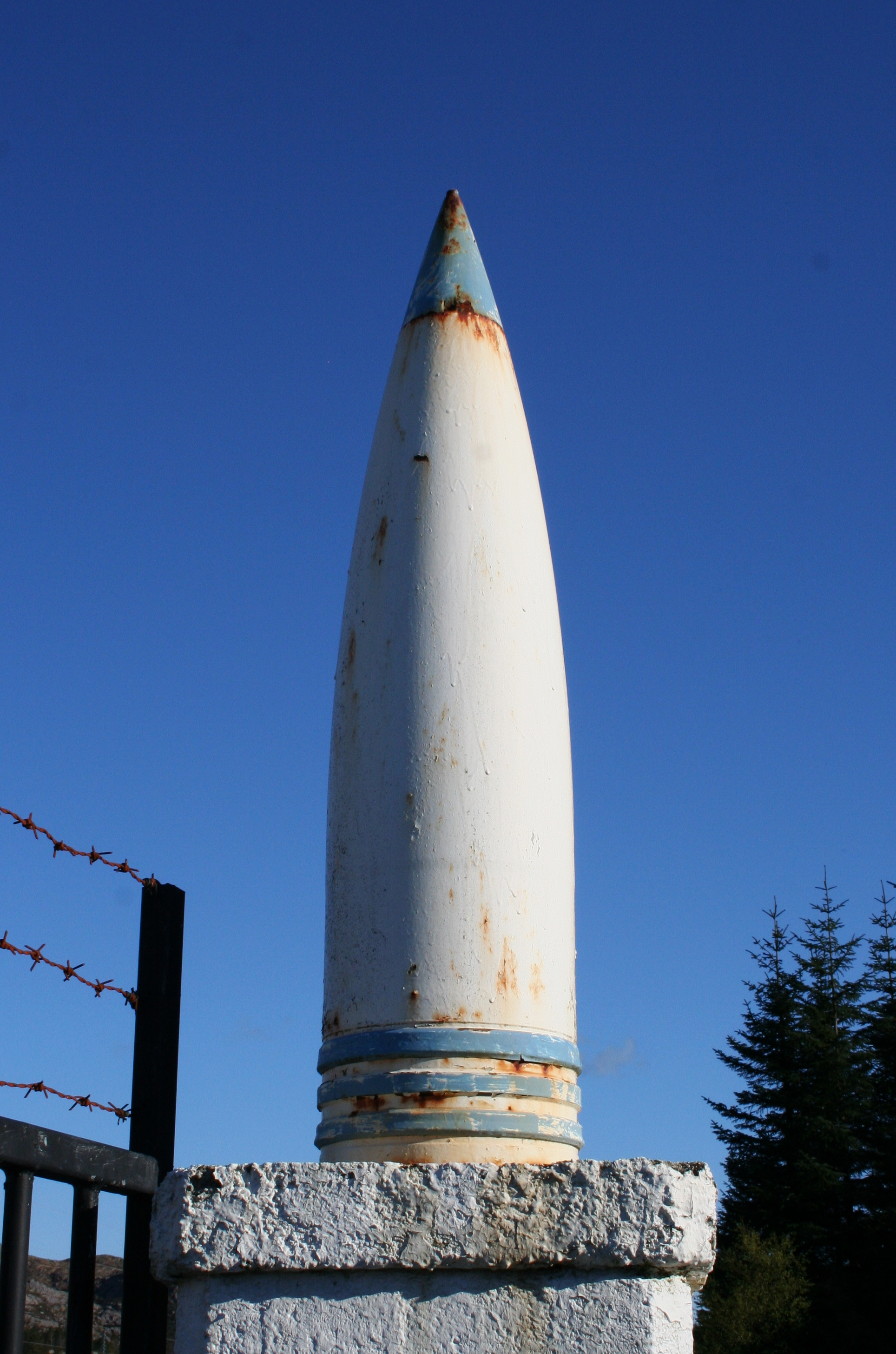
Coast-defence shell at Fjell festning in Sotra, Norway

Characteristics of SK C/28 and SK C/34 283 mm shells:

Gun type	Shell type	Length (calibers)	Total weight
SK C/28	Armor-piercing	3.7	300 kg (660 lb)
	Semi-armor-piercing	4.2	300 kg (660 lb)
	Igniting	4.2	300 kg (660 lb)
SK C/34	Armor-piercing	4.4	336 kg (741 lb)
	Semi-armorpiercing	4.4	316 kg (697 lb)
	Igniting	4.5	315 kg (694 lb)

== Surviving examples ==
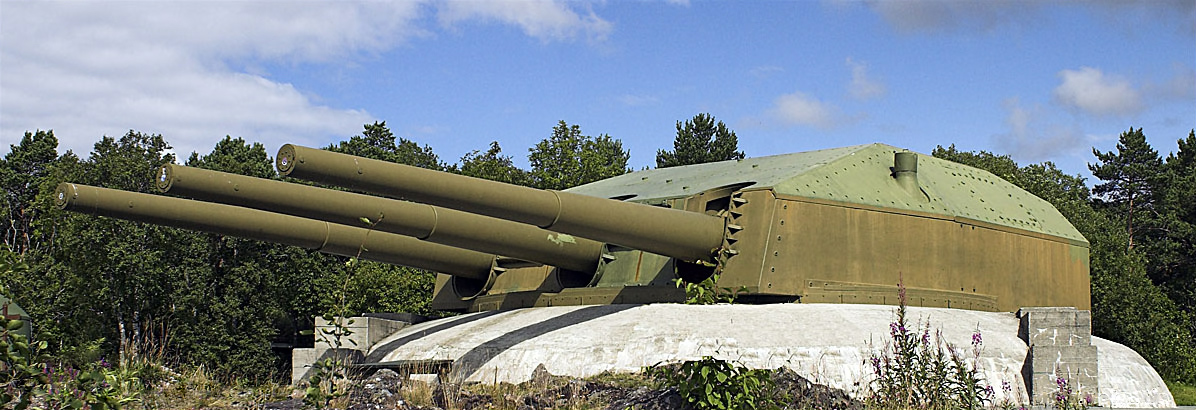
Gneisenau's Cäsar turret at Austrått fort, Ørlandet, Norway

- Gneisenau's Cäsar turret with its 3 guns survives at Austrått fort, Ørlandet, Norway
- Parts of the guns from Anton turret survive at former "Stichting Fort", Hook of Holland

== See also ==
- List of naval guns
