= German battleship Gneisenau =

Scharnhorst-class battleship

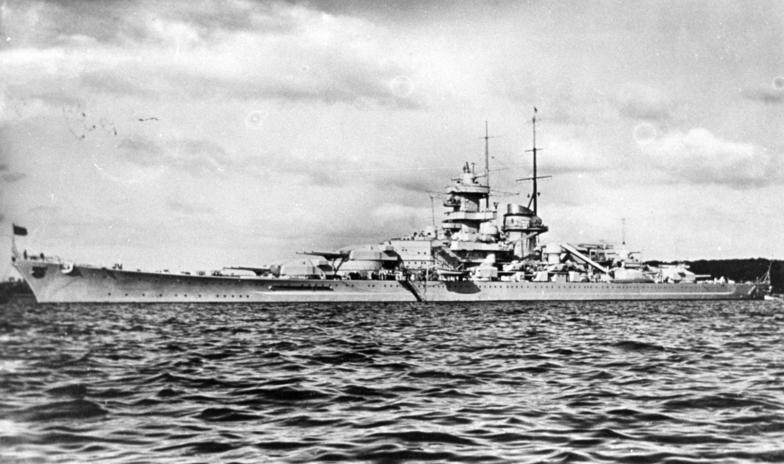
- Gneisenau

History

Germany
- Name: Gneisenau
- Namesake: August Neidhardt von Gneisenau
- Builder: Deutsche Werke
- Laid down: 6 May 1935
- Launched: 8 December 1936
- Commissioned: 21 May 1938
- Decommissioned: 1 July 1942
- Fate: Sunk as a blockship 23 March 1945, scrapped in 1951

General characteristics
- Class & type: Scharnhorst-class battleship
- Displacement: Standard: 32,100 long tons (32,600 t); Full load: 38,100 long tons (38,700 t)
- Length: 229.8 m (753 ft 11 in)
- Beam: 30 m (98 ft 5 in)
- Draft: 9.9 m (32 ft 6 in)
- Installed power: 165,930 PS (163,660 shp; 122,040 kW)
- Propulsion: 3 Germania geared steam turbines
- Speed: 31 knots (57 km/h; 36 mph)
- Range: 6,200 nmi (11,500 km; 7,100 mi) at 19 knots (35 km/h; 22 mph)
- Complement: 56 officers; 1,613 enlisted
- Armament: 9 × 28 cm/54.5 (11 inch) SK C/34; 12 × 15 cm/55 (5.9") SK C/28; 14 × 10.5 cm (4.1 in) SK C/33; 16 × 3.7 cm (1.5 in) SK C/30; 10 (later 16) × 2 cm (0.79 in) C/30 or C/38; 6 × 533 mm (21 in) torpedo tubes
- Armor: Belt: 320 mm (12.6 in); Deck: 50 to 105 mm (2.0 to 4.1 in); Turrets: 200 to 360 mm (7.9 to 14.2 in); Conning tower: 350 mm
- Aircraft carried: 3 Arado Ar 196A
- Aviation facilities: 1 catapult

Gneisenau (German pronunciation: [ˈɡnaɪ̯zənaʊ̯]) was a German capital ship, alternatively described as a battleship and battlecruiser, in Nazi Germany's Kriegsmarine. She was the second vessel of her class, which included her sister ship, Scharnhorst. The ship was built at the Deutsche Werke dockyard in Kiel; she was laid down on 6 May 1935 and launched on 8 December 1936. Her outfitting was completed in May 1938: she was armed with a main battery of nine 28 cm (11 in) C/34 guns in three triple turrets. At one point after construction had started, a plan had been approved to replace these weapons with six 38 cm (15 in) SK C/34 guns in twin turrets, but when it was realized that this would involve a lot of redesign, that plan was abandoned, and construction continued with the originally planned lower-calibre guns. The upgrade had been intended to be completed in the winter of 1940–41, but instead, due to the outbreak of World War II, that work was stopped.

Gneisenau and Scharnhorst operated together for much of the early portion of World War II, for example making sorties into the Atlantic to raid British merchant ships. During their first operation, the two ships sank the British auxiliary cruiser HMS Rawalpindi in a short battle. Gneisenau and Scharnhorst also participated in the German invasion of Norway: Operation Weserübung. During operations off the coast of Norway, the two ships engaged the battlecruiser HMS Renown and sank the aircraft carrier HMS Glorious. Gneisenau was damaged in the action with Renown and later torpedoed by a British submarine, HMS Clyde, off the coast of Norway. After a successful raid in the Atlantic in 1941, Gneisenau and her sister ship put in at Brest, France. The two battleships were the object of repeated bombing raids by the RAF, during which Gneisenau was hit several times, though she was ultimately repaired.

In early 1942, the two ships – along with the heavy cruiser Prinz Eugen – successfully made a daylight dash up the English Channel from occupied France to Germany. After reaching Kiel in early February, Gneisenau went into drydock. On the night of 26 February, the British launched an air attack on her; one bomb penetrated her armored deck and exploded in the forward ammunition magazine, causing serious damage and many casualties. The necessary repairs would have been so time-consuming that it was decided instead to rebuild the ship to replace the nine 28 cm guns with six 38 cm guns in double turrets. The 28 cm guns were removed and used as shore batteries. But in 1943 Hitler issued a stop-work order on the ship. On 27 March 1945, having been moved to Gotenhafen (Gdynia) in German-occupied Poland, she was sunk as a blockship, and in 1951 she was broken up for scrap.

== Design ==
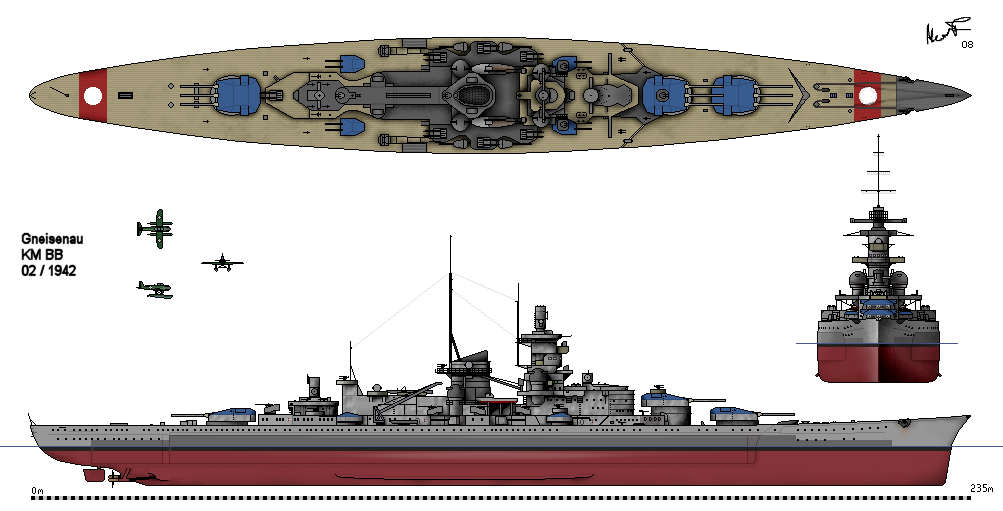
Gneisenau as she appeared in February 1942

Gneisenau displaced 32,100 long tons (32,600 t) at standard displacement and 38,100 long tons (38,700 t) at full load. She was 229.8 m (753 ft 11 in) long overall and had a beam of 30 m (98 ft 5 in) and a maximum draft of 9.9 m (32 ft 6 in). She was powered by three Germania geared steam turbines, which developed a total of 165,930 metric horsepower (163,660 shp; 122,041 kW) and yielded a maximum speed of 31.3 knots (58.0 km/h; 36.0 mph) on speed trials. Her standard crew numbered 56 officers and 1,613 enlisted men, though during the war this was augmented up to 60 officers and 1,780 men. While serving as a squadron flagship, Gneisenau carried an additional ten officers and 61 enlisted men.

She was armed with a main battery of nine 28 cm (11.1 in) L/54.5 guns arranged in three triple gun turrets: two turrets were placed forward in a superfiring arrangement—Anton and Bruno—and one aft—Caesar. Her secondary armament consisted of twelve 15 cm (5.9 in) L/55 guns, eight of which were placed in two-gun turrets and the remaining four were carried in individual turrets. Her heavy anti-aircraft armament consisted of fourteen 10.5 cm L/65. These guns were directed by four SL-6 stabilized anti-aircraft director posts. The light anti-aircraft armament consisted of sixteen 3.7 cm (1.5 in) SK C/30 L/83, and initially ten 2 cm (0.79 in) C/30 anti-aircraft guns. The number of 2 cm guns was eventually increased to thirty-eight. Two triple 53.3 cm (21 in) above-water torpedo tubes, taken from the light cruiser Leipzig, were installed in March 1941.

Gneisenau had an armor belt that was 320 mm (12.6 in) thick in the central portion, where it protected the ship's ammunition magazines and propulsion machinery spaces. The ship had an armor deck that was 20 to 40 mm (0.79 to 1.57 in) thick on the flat portion, increasing to 105 mm (4.1 in) on downward-sloping sides that connected to the bottom of the belt. Her main battery turrets had 360 mm (14 in) of armor on their faces and 200 mm (7.9 in) on their sides. The conning tower was protected with 350 mm on the sides.

== Service history ==
Gneisenau was ordered as Ersatz Hessen as a replacement for the old pre-dreadnought Hessen, under the contract name "E." The Deutsche Werke in Kiel was awarded the contract, where the keel was laid on 6 May 1935. The ship was launched on 8 December 1936, after which fitting-out work was begun. The ship was completed in May 1938 and commissioned for sea trials on the 21st, under the command of Kapitän zur See (KzS) Erich Förste. The trials revealed a dangerous tendency to ship considerable amounts of water in heavy seas. This caused flooding in the bow and damaged electrical systems in the forward gun turret. As a result, she went back to the dockyard for extensive modification of the bow. The original straight stem was replaced with a raised "Atlantic bow." A diagonal cap was fitted to the smoke stack to keep the main mast free of smoke. The modifications were completed by September 1939, by which time the ship was finally fully operational.

Gneisenau left Germany for a round of trials in the Atlantic in June 1939. As it was peacetime, the ship carried primarily practice ammunition, with only a small number of live rounds. She was back in Germany when war began in September 1939. On the 4th, the day after the British declaration of war, Gneisenau was attacked by fourteen Wellington bombers, though they made no hits. In November, KzS Förste was replaced by KzS Harald Netzbandt.

The ship's first combat operation, under the command of Admiral Hermann Boehm, involved a sortie together with the light cruiser Köln and nine destroyers through the Kattegat and Skagerrak towards the Norwegian coast on 7 October. The intent was to feint a breakout into the Atlantic which would keep pressure on the British to continue convoying, and to ease the pressure on the heavy cruiser Admiral Graf Spee, which was being pursued in the South Atlantic. A third goal was to draw the Home Fleet out of Scapa Flow and lure them into range of the Luftwaffe. The German force was found by British air reconnaissance on 8 October at the Norwegian south coast and promptly returned home, arriving on 10 October in Kiel. The Home fleet left Scapa Flow to intercept the German force but did not find anything. A total of 148 German aircraft were deployed to attack the Home Fleet but they achieved nothing. The British launched an air attack consisting of 12 Wellington bombers, though it too failed to hit any of the German warships. The Home Fleet did not return to Scapa Flow so when U-47 penetrated the harbor defenses of Scapa Flow on 14 October to attack the Home Fleet, it found only the old battleship HMS Royal Oak lying at anchor.

The ship's second combat operation, under the command of Admiral Wilhelm Marschall, began on 21 November 1939; the ship, in company with her sister Scharnhorst, was to attack the Northern Patrol between Iceland and the Faroe Islands. The intent of the operation was again to draw out British units and ease the pressure on the heavy cruiser Admiral Graf Spee. A patrol line of four U-boats was stationed in the North Sea to intercept any sortie from the Home Fleet. (Note: Rohwer mentions the U-boat trap on the first combat mission, but Blair clearly details it during the second combat mission) The two battleships left Wilhelmshaven in company of the light cruisers Köln and Leipzig, and three destroyers, which parted company in the morning of 22 November for operations in the Skagerrak. The next day, the German flotilla intercepted the auxiliary cruiser Rawalpindi. Scharnhorst fired first, followed by Gneisenau eight minutes later. The ship was quickly reduced to a burning wreck; Marschall ordered Scharnhorst to pick up survivors while he stood by in Gneisenau. The cruiser Newcastle arrived on the scene, which prompted Marschall to halt rescue operations and flee. Based on the reports of Rawalpindi and Newcastle, the British deployed the Home Fleet with the battleships Nelson and Rodney from the Clyde towards Norway in case the Germans intended to return to Germany, and the battlecruisers Hood and the French Dunkerque left from Devonport towards Iceland to prevent a breakout towards the Atlantic. Aware of these deployments through the B-Dienst, Marschall retreated northwards and waited for bad weather in order to break through a British cruiser and destroyer patrol line between Shetland and Norway. The Germans reached Wilhelmshaven on 27 November, and on the trip both battleships incurred significant damage from heavy seas and winds.

After returning to Kiel, Gneisenau went into drydock for repairs for the storm damage. During the repairs, the bow was remodeled a second time to incorporate additional flare and sheer, in an attempt to improve her seaworthiness. Gneisenau went into the Baltic for trials on 15 January 1940, after the completion of the refit. Her voyage back to the North Sea was blocked by ice in the Kiel Canal until 4 February. Between 18 February and 20 February, she participated in Operation Nordmark, a brief sortie into the North Sea as far as the Shetland Islands.

=== Operation Weserübung ===
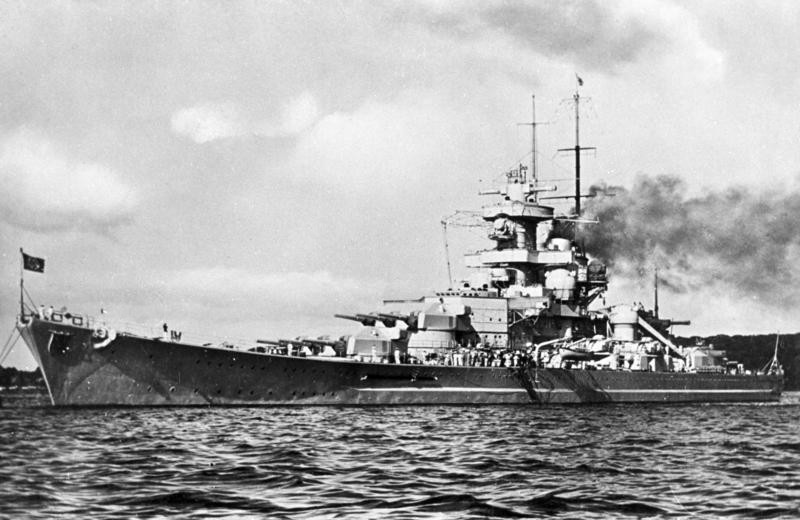
Gneisenau in port

Gneisenau was assigned to the forces participating in Operation Weserübung, the invasion of Denmark and Norway. She and her sister were the covering force for the assaults on Narvik and Trondheim (Flag Officer Vize Admiral Günther Lütjens). The two ships left Wilhelmshaven on the morning of 7 April, along with the heavy cruiser Admiral Hipper and fourteen destroyers. The cruiser and destroyers carried the assault forces for Narvik and Trondheim, while Gneisenau and Scharnhorst provided cover for them. Later that day, at around 14:30, the three ships came under attack by a force of British bombers, though the bombers failed to make any hits. On the morning of 8 April, the destroyer Z11 Bernd von Arnim encountered the British destroyer Glowworm. Before being sunk, Glowworm rammed Admiral Hipper, though the latter was not seriously damaged. The crews of the two battleships went to battle stations, though they did not take part in the brief engagement. At 21:00, Gneisenau and Scharnhorst took up a position west of the Vestfjorden to provide distant cover to both of the landings at Narvik and Trondheim.

At 04:30 on the 9th, Gneisenau located the British battlecruiser Renown with her Seetakt radar; the call to battle stations rang out on both Gneisenau and Scharnhorst, though it was Renown that fired first, at 05:05. Gneisenau scored two hits on Renown; the first failed to explode and the second exploded on her upper deck and damaged the radio equipment. Gneisenau and Scharnhorst then turned to disengage. Almost simultaneously, two of Renown's 15 in (38 cm) shells struck Gneisenau. One shell hit the director tower and passed through it without exploding; regardless, it cut several cables and killed one officer and five enlisted men. The second shell disabled the rear turret. This prompted Gneisenau to cease firing and increase speed in order to break away from Renown. Vice Admiral Lütjens feared that the destroyers escorting Renown could be used to make torpedo attacks against his unescorted battleships. In the course of the action, Gneisenau fired sixty 28 cm and eight 15 cm rounds. During the high-speed escape, both Gneisenau and Scharnhorst were flooded by significant quantities of water over their bows, which caused problems in both of their forward gun turrets.

Scharnhorst and Gneisenau had reached a point north-west of Lofoten, Norway, by 12:00 on 9 April. The two ships then turned west for 24 hours while temporary repairs were effected. After a day of steaming west, the ships turned south. Since broadcasting radio messages would betray the position of the ships to the British, an Arado 196 float plane was launched by Scharnhorst on 10 April at 12:00 with the instruction to fly in the direction of Norway and to signal there the intentions of Lütjens to break through to Germany in the night of 11 April. The plane was launched at extreme range and could barely reach the outer islands on the Norwegian coast where it managed to send its message. The float plane was towed to Trondheim where it could also convey Lütjens' order to Admiral Hipper to join the German battleships in the return journey to Germany. Admiral Hipper joined in the morning of 12 April but her four destroyers had to stay back at Trondheim because of lack of fuel. A Royal Air Force (RAF) patrol aircraft spotted the three ships that day, and 82 RAF Bomber Command and nine RAF Coastal Command aircraft were ordered to attack the ships. The German warships were protected by poor visibility, however, and none of the bombers found the ships whilst losing nine of their number to German fighters.

The three ships safely reached Wilhelmshaven at 22:00. There, the damage incurred during the engagement with Renown was repaired. She was then drydocked in Bremerhaven for periodic maintenance on 26–29 April. The ship was to go to the Baltic following the completion of repairs, but on the morning of 5 May, while steaming at 22 knots (41 km/h; 25 mph) off the Elbe estuary, Gneisenau detonated a magnetic mine about 21 m (69 ft) off the port rear quarter and 24 m (79 ft) below the hull. The explosion caused significant damage to the hull and flooded several compartments, which caused the ship to take on a half-degree list to port. The concussive shock from the blast damaged many internal and topside components, including the starboard low-pressure turbine and the rear rangefinders. Repairs were effected in a floating drydock in Kiel from 6 to 21 May. A brief shakedown cruise followed in the Baltic, and by the 27th, she was back in Kiel at full combat readiness.

=== Operation Juno ===
Gneisenau and Scharnhorst left Wilhelmshaven on 4 June to return to Norway. They were joined by Admiral Hipper and four destroyers. The purpose of Operation Juno was to interrupt Allied resupply efforts to the Norwegians and to relieve the pressure on German troops fighting in Norway. On 7 June, the squadron rendezvoused with the tanker Dithmarschen to refuel Admiral Hipper and the four destroyers. The next day, they discovered and sank the trawler Juniper, along with the oil tanker Oil Pioneer. The Germans then launched their Arado 196 float planes to search for more Allied vessels. Admiral Hipper and the destroyers were sent to destroy Orama, a passenger ship of 19,500 GRT; the Germans allowed Atlantis, a hospital ship, to proceed unmolested. Admiral Marschall, who had returned from sick leave to command the sortie, detached Admiral Hipper and the four destroyers to refuel in Trondheim, while he steamed to the Harstad area.

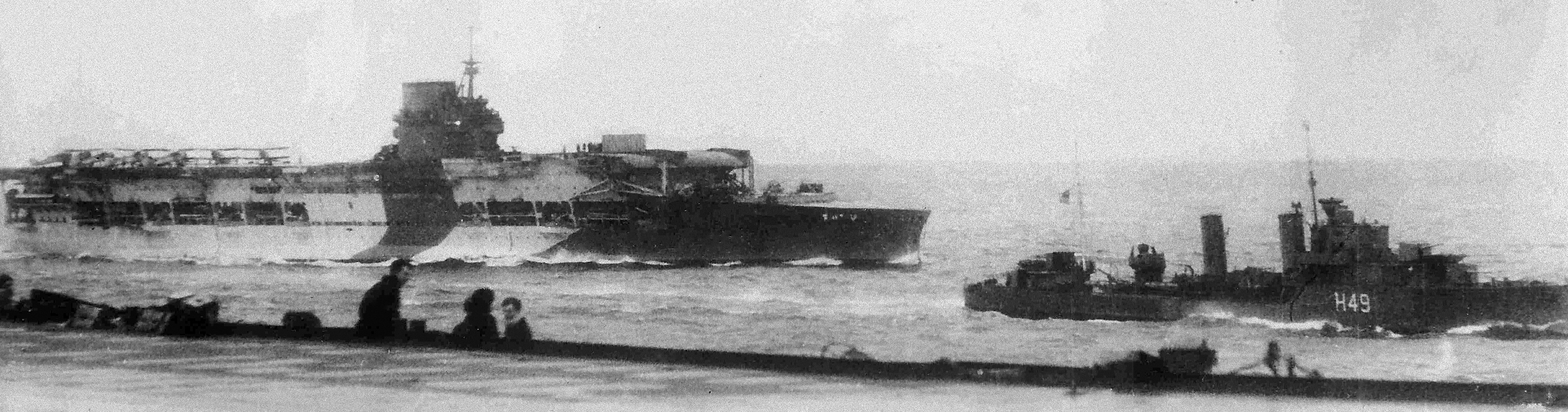
HMS Glorious photographed in May 1940 operating off Norway

At 17:45, the German battleships spotted the British aircraft carrier Glorious and two escorting destroyers, Ardent and Acasta, at an approximate range of 40,000 m (44,000 yd). The German ships turned towards Glorious and increased speed from 19 knots (35 km/h; 22 mph) to 29 knots (54 km/h; 33 mph) and then turned again to intercept, still increasing in speed. Gneisenau opened fire on Ardent, the nearest destroyer at 18:28. Scharnhorst, the lead ship, fired at Glorious 4 minutes later from a range of 26,000 m (28,000 yd). Scharnhorst achieved a hit with her third salvo at 18:38 and shortly after engaged Ardent with her secondary armament, whilst still firing at Glorious with the main armament. Ardent fired the first of several torpedoes at the two German ships, requiring Scharnhorst to take evasive action at 18:45, and again 10 minutes later. Gneisenau opened fire on Glorious at 18:46. A problem with Scharnhorst's boilers now reduced her speed to 29 knots (54 km/h; 33 mph), so Gneisenau took over station ahead. By now, Glorious was burning and listing heavily to starboard, but still travelling at high speed.

The British ships made extensive use of smoke screens. Though the German battleships had available their Seetakt radar to assist the gunlaying, lack of target visibility required temporary ceasefires due to this smoke. The Germans found that the British destroyers were skilfully handled, making them difficult targets. Ardent continued firing torpedoes after receiving serious damage that reduced her speed. She eventually capsized at 19:22, at which time Glorious was burning fiercely. Acasta then headed for the German ships, making smoke and firing torpedoes. One torpedo hit Scharnhorst at 19:39 when she returned to her course too soon after taking evasive action. Acasta was hit on making a second torpedo attack out of her smokescreen and severely damaged, sinking at about 20:08.

The torpedo hit on Scharnhorst caused serious damage. After all three British ships had been sunk, Marschall withdrew his force to Trondheim to conduct emergency repairs to Scharnhorst. In the meantime, Marschall sortied with Gneisenau, Admiral Hipper, and four destroyers, though after two days he returned to Trondheim when it became clear that the British convoys were too heavily guarded.

Admiral Günther Lütjens replaced Marschall as the commander of the squadron permanently, and on 20 June Lütjens sortied with Gneisenau, Admiral Hipper, and four destroyers in the direction of Iceland. His intention was to give the impression he was attempting to break out into the Atlantic, to draw British attention away from Scharnhorst as she made the return voyage to Germany. About 40 nmi (74 km; 46 mi) northwest of Halten, however, the submarine Clyde torpedoed Gneisenau. The torpedo hit Gneisenau in the bow, just forward of the splinter belt, and caused serious damage. The ship took on a significant amount of water in the two forward watertight compartments, and she was forced to return to Trondheim at reduced speed. In Trondheim, the repair ship Huascaran effected temporary repairs that permitted Gneisenau to return to Kiel on 25–27 July, escorted by Admiral Hipper, Nürnberg, four destroyers, and six torpedo boats. A strong force from the British Home Fleet attempted to intercept the flotilla, but the British failed to find it. Upon arrival, Gneisenau went into drydock at the Howaldtswerke dockyard for five months of repair work. In August, the ship's commander was replaced by KzS Otto Fein, who would captain the ship for the majority of her active wartime career.

=== Operation Berlin ===
Scharnhorst joined Gneisenau, in preparation for Operation Berlin, the planned breakout into the Atlantic Ocean designed to wreak havoc on the Allied shipping lanes. Severe storms caused damage to Gneisenau, though Scharnhorst was undamaged. The two ships were forced to put into port during the storm: Gneisenau went to Kiel for repairs while Scharnhorst put into Gdynia (Gotenhafen). Repairs were quickly completed, and on 22 January 1941, the two ships, again under the command of Admiral Lütjens, left port for the North Atlantic. They were detected in the Skagerrak and the heavy units of the British Home Fleet deployed to cover the passage between Iceland and the Faroes. The Germans' radar detected the British at long range, which allowed Lütjens to avoid the British patrols, with the aid of a squall. By 3 February, the two battleships had evaded the last British cruiser patrol, and had broken into the open Atlantic.

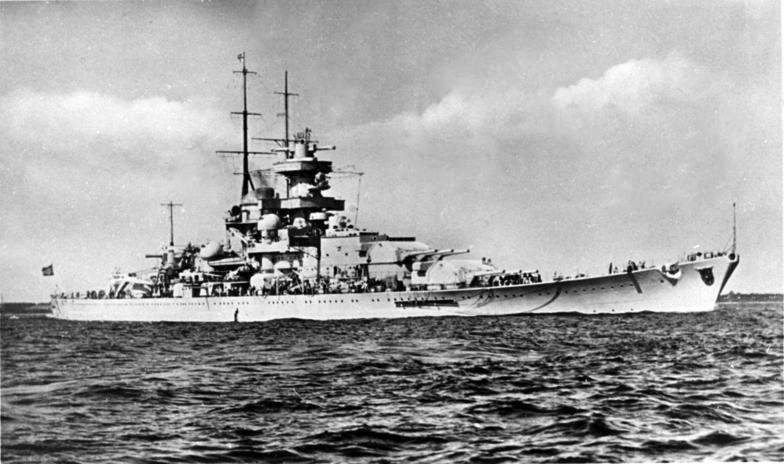
Gneisenau after her second bow alteration in 1942.

On 6 February, the two ships refueled from the tanker Schlettstadt south of Cape Farewell. Shortly after 08:30 on 8 February, lookouts spotted convoy HX 106, though it was escorted by the battleship Ramillies. Lütjens' orders prohibited him from engaging Allied capital ships, and so the attack was called off. Scharnhorst's commander, KzS Hoffmann, however, closed to 23,000 m (25,000 yd) in an attempt to lure Ramillies away from the convoy so that Gneisenau could attack the convoy. Lütjens ordered Hoffmann to rejoin the flagship immediately. The two battleships steamed off to the northwest to search for more shipping. On 22 February, the pair spotted an empty convoy sailing west, though it dispersed at the appearance of the battleships. Gneisenau sank three ships, and along with a fourth destroyed by Scharnhorst, the pair accounted for 25,784 GRT of Allied shipping.

Lütjens then decided to move to a new area, as the surviving members of the dispersed convoy had sent distress signals. He chose the Cape Town-Gibraltar convoy route, and positioned himself to the northwest of Cape Verde. The two ships encountered another convoy, escorted by the battleship Malaya, on 8 March. Lütjens again forbade an attack, though he shadowed the convoy and directed U-boats to attack it. A pair of U-boats sank a total of 28,488 GRT of shipping on the night of 7–8 March. Malaya turned on the two battleships and closed to 24,000 m (26,000 yd), well within the range of the Germans' guns, but Lütjens refused to be drawn into an engagement. He instead turned toward the mid-Atlantic, where the two ships refueled from the tankers Uckermark and Ermland on 12 March.

On 15 March, the two battleships, with the two tankers in company, encountered a dispersed convoy in the mid-Atlantic. Gneisenau captured three tankers and sank a fourth, totaling 20,139 GRT of shipping. The next day, stragglers from a convoy were sighted. Gneisenau sank seven ships for 26,693 GRT, while her sister accounted for six vessels for 35,088 long tons (35,651 t). One of the surviving ships radioed the location of the German battleships, which summoned the powerful British battleships Rodney and King George V. Scharnhorst and Gneisenau used their high speed to escape in a squall, and the intervention by the British battleships convinced Lütjens that the chances of further success were small. He therefore decided to head for Brest in occupied France, which the ships reached on 22 March. She then entered drydock for periodic maintenance.

=== Air attacks in Brest ===
After arriving in Brest, Gneisenau was the subject of repeated British air raids. The first attack took place on the night of 30–31 March, and a second occurred on 4–5 April. During this second raid, a 500 lb (227 kg) armor-piercing (AP) bomb narrowly missed the ship. As a result of the attacks, the ship was moved out of the dry dock and moved to the harbor. On 6 April, Gneisenau was attacked by British torpedo bombers, which managed to score a single hit. The Bristol Beaufort that struck the ship was piloted by Flying Officer Kenneth Campbell, who was killed in the attack, for which he was awarded the Victoria Cross. The torpedo struck Gneisenau in the vicinity of the rear main battery turret. Some 3,050 t (3,000 long tons) of water flooded the ship and caused a 2 degree list to starboard. The flooding also disabled several components of the ship's propulsion system. The explosion caused significant destruction to the side plating as well as the starboard and centerline propeller shafts. The concussive shock also caused widespread damage to the ship's electronic components. A salvage tug came alongside to assist in the pumping effort. Following the attack, Gneisenau returned to the drydock for repairs.

Three days later, on the night of 9–10 April, several British bombers dropped around 25 t (25 long tons) of 227 kg AP bombs on the ship, four of which hit. All four hit the starboard side of the forward superstructure. Two of the bombs exploded on the main armor deck while the other two failed to detonate. The attack killed 72 initially and wounded 90, of whom 16 later died of their injuries. The bombs slightly damaged the main armor deck and caused some structural damage on the starboard side. It was decided to make alterations to the ship while she was drydocked for repairs; these included the installation of fourteen additional 2 cm anti-aircraft guns and six 53.3 cm torpedo tubes amidships. The aircraft hangar was rearranged, and the catapult that had been mounted on top of it was removed. The length of repairs and modifications precluded participation in Operation Rheinübung, the sortie by the new battleship Bismarck in May 1941. The British continued to attack the ship in drydock, though no further damage was done. On 6 February 1942, a bomb fell close to Gneisenau, but caused no damage.

=== Operation Cerberus ===
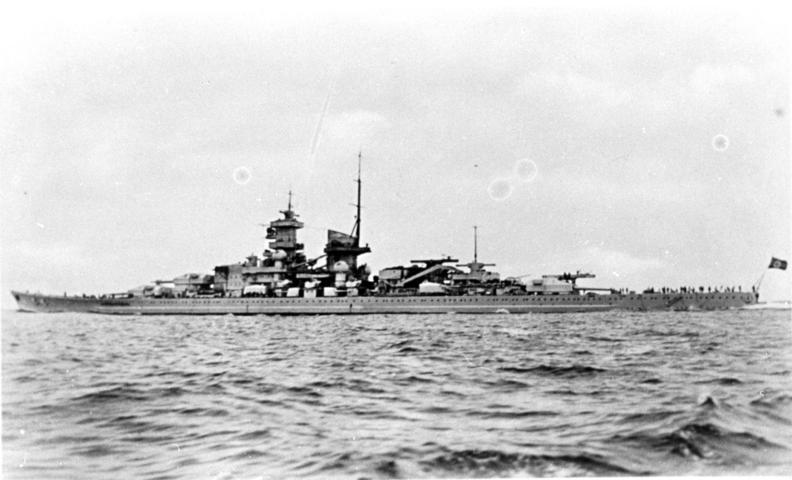
Gneisenau at sea

On 12 January 1942, the German Naval Command, in a conference with Hitler, made the decision to return Gneisenau, Scharnhorst, and the heavy cruiser Prinz Eugen to Germany. The intention was to deploy the vessels to Norway to interdict Allied convoys to the Soviet Union. The so-called "Channel Dash", codenamed Operation Cerberus, would avoid the increasingly effective Allied radar and patrol aircraft in the Atlantic. Vice Admiral Otto Ciliax was given command of the operation. In early February, minesweepers swept a route through the English Channel, though the British failed to detect the activity.

At 23:00 on 11 February, Scharnhorst, Gneisenau, and Prinz Eugen left Brest. They entered the Channel an hour later; the three ships sped at 27 knots (50 km/h; 31 mph), hugging the French coast along the voyage. The British failed to detect their departure, as the submarine that had been tasked with observing the port had withdrawn to recharge its batteries. By 06:30, they had passed Cherbourg, at which point they were joined by a flotilla of torpedo boats. The torpedo boats were led by Kapitän Erich Bey, aboard the destroyer Z29. General der Jagdflieger (General of Fighter Force) Adolf Galland directed Luftwaffe fighter and bomber forces (Operation Donnerkeil) during Cerberus. The fighters flew at masthead-height to avoid detection by the British radar network. Liaison officers were present on all three ships. By 13:00, the ships had cleared the Strait of Dover, though half an hour later, a flight of six Swordfish torpedo bombers, with Spitfire escort, attacked the Germans. The British failed to penetrate the Luftwaffe fighter shield and all six Swordfish were destroyed. Several more attacks were launched over the next two hours, but the Luftwaffe screen repulsed them all.

Five British destroyers mounted an attack on the German squadron at 16:17. The ships attempted to close to torpedo range, though heavy seas and overcast conditions hampered their attack. Gneisenau and Prinz Eugen inflicted serious damage to the destroyer Worcester. At 19:55, Gneisenau detonated a magnetic mine off Terschelling. The mine exploded just forward of the rear gun turret but caused only minor damage. Slight flooding was quickly stopped, though the shock disabled the center turbine. The ship stopped for less than 30 minutes before resuming the voyage; by 03:50, Gneisenau and two destroyers reached Helgoland. After being joined there by Prinz Eugen, the ships left for Kiel, but thick ice in the canal forced the ships to stop in Brunsbüttel. While maneuvering in port, Gneisenau struck a submerged wreck. The collision tore a hole in the hull and caused some minor flooding. Gneisenau reached Kiel the following day, where she went into a floating dry dock at the Deutsche Werke dockyard.

== Fate ==
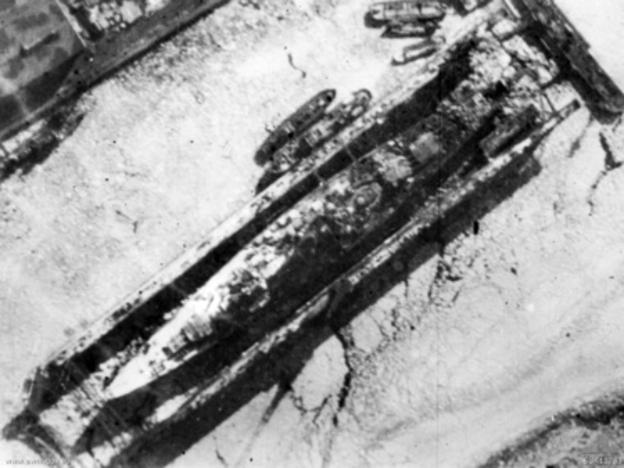
Aerial reconnaissance photo of Gneisenau in dry dock, March 1942, after the air attack.

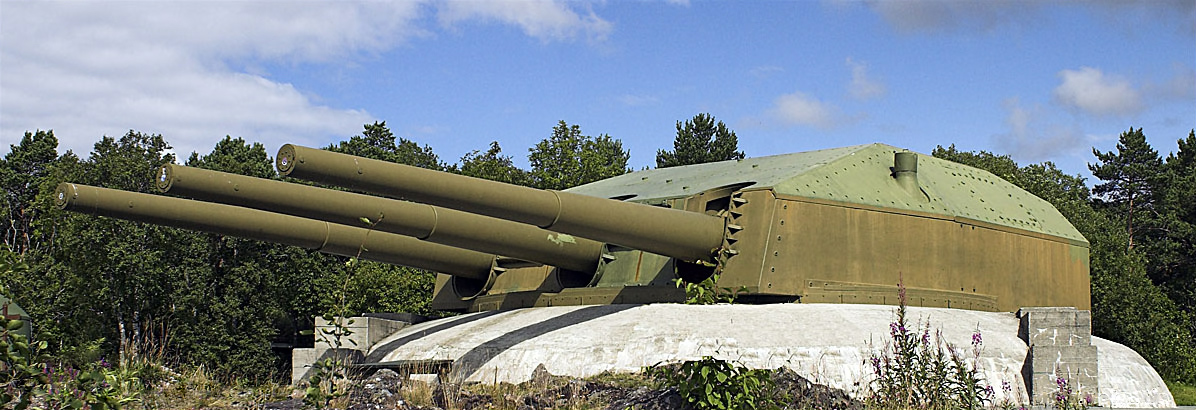
Gneisenau's 28 cm turret Caesar at Austrått Fort, Norway.

Repair work on Gneisenau was completed by 26 February 1942, and she was scheduled to deploy to Norway on 6 March. Despite the fact that she was still in dry dock, her ammunition stores had been restocked and she was prepared for a short round of trials before her departure. On the night of 26–27 February, however, the British launched a heavy air raid on the ship. The ship was hit by a single bomb in her forecastle that penetrated the armored deck and exploded. Red-hot bomb fragments ignited propellant charges in the forward turret and caused a tremendous explosion. The turret was thrown off its mount and the entire bow section was burned out. The crew partially flooded the magazine to prevent a more catastrophic explosion. The blast killed 112 men and wounded 21 others.

The extensive damage convinced the Naval Staff to rebuild Gneisenau to mount the six 38 cm guns originally planned, rather than repair the ship. The damaged bow section was removed in order to attach a lengthened bow, which would correct the decrease in freeboard that would have been caused by the heavier 38 cm guns. On 4 April, the ship went to Gotenhafen, escorted by the training ship Schlesien and the icebreaker Castor. She was formally decommissioned on 1 July. Her crew were paid off and redeployed to the U-boat arm.

By early 1943, the ship had been sufficiently repaired to begin the conversion process, but Hitler, angered by the failure of German surface raiders at the Battle of the Barents Sea in December 1942, ordered the cessation of all work. Gneisenau was disarmed and her 28 cm and 15 cm gun turrets were used in shore batteries. Turret Caesar was installed in Austrått Fort near Trondheim as the coastal battery Orlandet.

Gneisenau remained unused in Gotenhafen until the end of the war. As the Red Army advanced on the city, the remaining crew took the ship out to the entrance of the harbor and sank the vessel as a blockship on 27 March 1945. In 1947, the Polish government ordered the ship be removed, and initial salvage operations began. The ship was sealed and refloated on 12 September 1951 then completely scrapped, though it is believed that some of her steel was used in the construction of Polish merchant vessels. She was the largest ship raised at the time. Norway offered to return the turret from Trondheim in 1979, though the offer was declined. The gun turret was instead preserved as a museum in Norway.
