= Günther Lütjens =

German admiral (1889–1941)

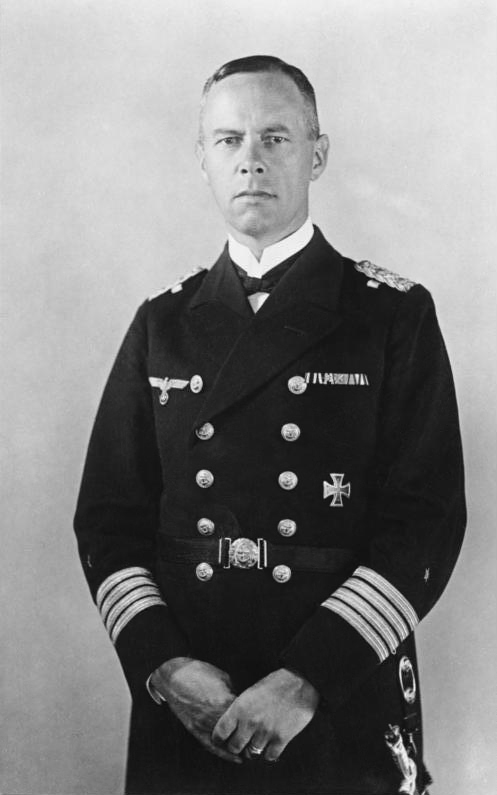
- Lütjens in 1934
- Born: 25 May 1889; Wiesbaden, Hesse-Nassau, German Empire
- Died: 27 May 1941 (aged 52); North Atlantic
- Military career
- Allegiance: German Empire; Weimar Republic; Nazi Germany
- Branch: Imperial German Navy; Reichsmarine; Kriegsmarine
- Service years: 1907–1941
- Rank: Admiral
- Nicknames: Pee Ontgens, Black Devil
- Units: SMS Freya; SMS Württemberg; SMS König Wilhelm; SMS Hansa
- Commands: Karlsruhe (1934–1935); Chief of the Personnel Office (1936−1937); Commander, Torpedo Boats (1937−1939); Commander, Scouting Forces (1939−1940); Fleet Commander (1940−1941)
- Conflicts: World War I; World War II; Norwegian Campaign; Operation Weserübung; Action off Lofoten; Atlantic War; Operation Berlin; Operation Rheinübung; Battle of the Denmark Strait; Last battle of the battleship Bismarck †
- Awards: Knight's Cross of the Iron Cross

Johann Günther Lütjens (German pronunciation: [ˈjoːhan ˈɡʏntɐ ˈlʏtjəns]; 25 May 1889 – 27 May 1941) was a German admiral whose military service spanned more than 30 years and two world wars. Lütjens is best known for his actions during World War II and his command of the battleship Bismarck during her foray into the Atlantic Ocean in 1941. He was killed in action during the last battle of the battleship Bismarck.

Born in 1889, Lütjens entered into the Imperial German Navy in 1907 and saw service during World War I against the British Royal Navy, achieving the rank of Kapitänleutnant (Lieutenant). After the war he remained in the navy, now renamed the Reichsmarine. In the Weimar Republic era, Lütjens built a reputation as an excellent staff officer. In 1935, after the Nazi regime came to power in 1933, the navy was remodelled again and renamed the Kriegsmarine. Lütjens soon became acquainted with Erich Raeder and Karl Dönitz, the two commanders-in-chief of the Kriegsmarine in World War II. His capability and friendship led to rapid promotions and a command of the cruiser Karlsruhe. By 1937, he had risen to the rank of Konteradmiral (rear admiral).

During the German invasion of Poland in September 1939, Lütjens commanded destroyer operations in the North Sea. In April 1940, now a Vizeadmiral (vice admiral), he was given temporary command of the entire German surface fleet during the initial landing phase of Operation Weserübung, the invasions of Denmark and Norway. In the aftermath of the campaign he was appointed the fleet commander of the Kriegsmarine and promoted to Admiral on 1 September 1940. In January 1941, Lütjens planned and executed Operation Berlin, an Atlantic raid to support U-boats in the Battle of the Atlantic by attacking British merchant shipping lanes. The operation was a tactical victory. It came to a close in March 1941, when the ships docked in German-occupied France after sailing some 18,000 miles, a record for a German battle group at the time.

In May 1941, Lütjens commanded a German task force, consisting of the battleship Bismarck and the heavy cruiser Prinz Eugen, during Operation Rheinübung. In a repetition of Berlin, Lütjens was required to break out of their naval base in occupied Poland, sail via occupied Norway, and attack merchant shipping. The operation went awry and the task force was soon spotted and engaged near Iceland. In the ensuing Battle of the Denmark Strait, HMS Hood was sunk and three other British warships were forced to retreat. The two German ships then separated. Three days later, on 27 May, Lütjens and most of the ship's crew drowned when Bismarck was caught and sunk. In the post-war navy of West Germany, the Bundesmarine, the destroyer Lütjens, launched in 1967, was named after Lütjens.

== Early life ==
Lütjens was born in Wiesbaden in Hesse-Nassau, a province of the Kingdom of Prussia, on 25 May 1889. He was the son of Luise (née Volz) and Johannes Lütjens, a merchant. Growing up in Freiburg im Breisgau, he graduated from the Berthold-Gymnasium with his diploma (Abitur) aged 17.

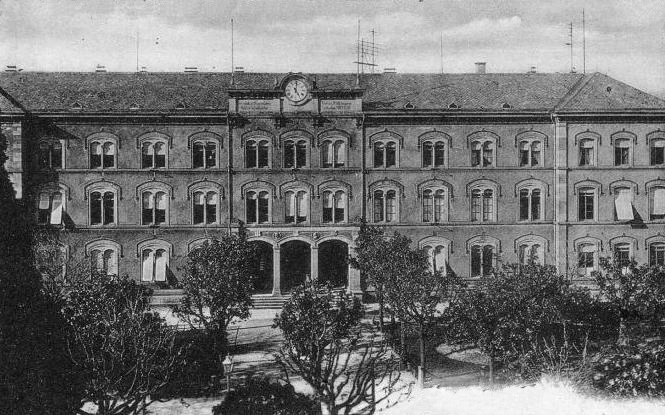
Berthold-Gymnasium Freiburg, 1900

He entered the Imperial German Navy (Kaiserliche Marine) as a Seekadett (Cadett) on 3 April 1907 at the German Imperial Naval Academy in Kiel, where he received his initial infantry training. He spent his initial year on Freya (9 May 1907 – 1 April 1908) for his practical training on board and his first world cruise, before attending an officers course at the German Imperial Naval Academy in Kiel. His comrades nicknamed him "Pee Ontgens" after a character from the book Das Meer (The Sea) by Bernhard Kellermann, which was one of his favourite books. Lütjens graduated 20th of 160 cadets from his "Crew 1907" (the incoming class of 1907), and was thereafter promoted to Fähnrich zur See (Midshipman) on 21 April 1908. Starting on 1 April 1909, he underwent naval artillery training at the Naval Artillery School (Note: Naval Artillery School—Schiffsartillerieschule) in Kiel-Wik and then participated in a torpedo course on board Württemberg on 1 July 1909.

Lütjens then attended another infantry course with the 2nd Sea-Battalion and boarded Elsass on 1 October 1909. (Note: 2nd Sea-Battalion — II. See-Bataillon) After receiving his commission as Leutnant zur See (Ensign) on 28 September 1910, he served on board König Wilhelm (26 September 1910 – 1 April 1911), a harbour ship, and then Hansa (1 April 1911 – 1 April 1913). He then returned to the König Wilhelm (1 April 1913 – 1 October 1913), where he served as an instructor of cabin boys and later as an instructor of cadets. König Wilhelm at the time was a barracks ship based in Kiel and used as a training vessel for naval cadets. He then completed two further world cruises on Hansa. Following these assignments, he was promoted to Oberleutnant zur See (Lieutenant Junior Grade) on 27 September 1913.

Lütjens' next assignment was with the 4th Torpedo-Boat-Flotilla, where he served as a watch officer. (Note: 4th Torpedo-Boat-Flotilla—4. Torpedobootflottille) On 1 October 1913, he was appointed company officer with the I. Torpedodivision, and served as a watch officer on torpedo boat G-169 of the 2nd Torpedo-Boat-Demi-Flotilla from 1 November. (Note: 2nd Torpedo-Boat-Demi-Flotilla—II. Torpedoboot-Halbflottille) On 24 December 1913, he returned to his position as company officer with the I. Torpedodivision, before becoming a watch officer on G-172 of the 2nd Torpedo-Boat-Demi-Flotilla on 15 March 1914.

== World War I ==
Shortly after World War I had begun, Lütjens was transferred to the Harbour Flotilla of the Jade Bight (Note: Harbor Flotilla of the Jade Bight—Hafenflottille der Jade) on 1 August 1914, followed shortly by his first command: torpedo boat T-68 of the 6th Torpedo-Boat-Demi-Flotilla on 4 September 1914. On 7 December 1914, he returned to the I. Torpedodivision, before attending a minesweeping course on 2 January 1915. After completion of this course, he was sent back again to the I. Torpdedivsion, where he took command of the training torpedo boat T-21 on 16 January. He served in this position until 14 March 1915, when he was posted back to the I. Torpedodivsion. On 5 May, he was transferred to the Torpedo-Boat-Flotilla "Flandern", serving as commander of torpedo boats A-5 and A-20. (Note: Torpedo-Boat-Flotilla "Flandern"—Torpedobootsflottille "Flander") He was appointed chief of the A-Demi-Flotilla in the II. Torpedo-Boat-Flotilla "Flandern" in February 1916, and at the same time commanded torpedo boat A-40. (Note: A-Demi-Flotilla—A-Halbflottille) He held this position until the end of World War I on 11 November 1918, when he returned to Antwerp and Kiel.

On 24 May 1917, Lütjens was promoted to Kapitänleutnant (captain lieutenant) during this assignment. As commander of torpedo boats along the Flanders coast, he led raids against Dunkirk on 23 March 1917. He was in combat with four British torpedo boats on 2 May 1917 and led five of his boats in actions against four French destroyers on 19 May 1917.

For his service in World War I, he received the Knight's Cross of the House Order of Hohenzollern with Swords and the Iron Cross (1914) 2nd and 1st Class, among other decorations and awards.

== Inter-war period ==
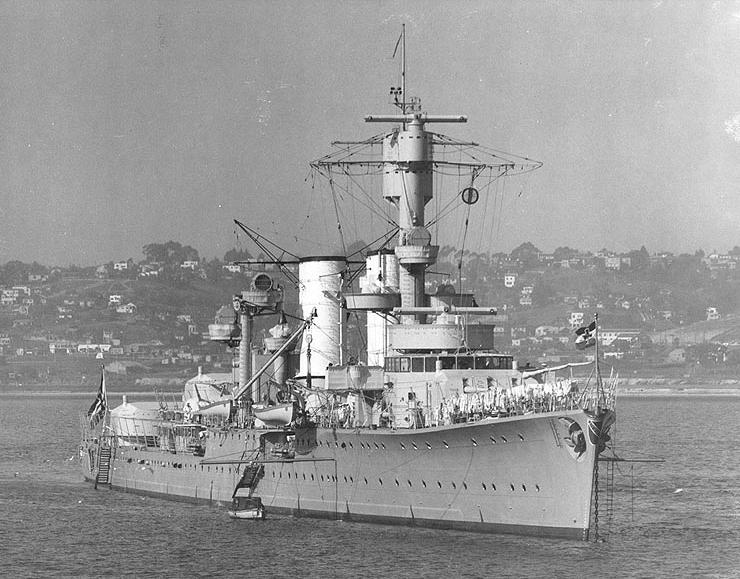
German cruiser Karlsruhe off San Diego, California in 1934

After the war, Lütjens served as head of the Warnemünde (1 December 1918 – 24 January 1919 and 8 February 1919 – 10 March 1919) and Lübeck (24 January 1919 – 8 February 1919 and 8 July 1919 – 15 September 1919) Sea Transportation Agency. (Note: Sea Transportation Agency—Seetransportstelle) He was ordered to the German Imperial Naval Office on 10 March 1919 and started serving with the Sea Transportation Agency in Lübeck on 8 July 1919. (Note: German Imperial Naval Office—Reichsmarineamt)

As a result of the Treaty of Versailles (signed on 28 June 1919) the German Navy was downsized to 15,000 men, including 1,500 officers. On 1 January 1921, the German Imperial Navy was renamed the Reichsmarine in the era of the Weimar Republic. On 15 September 1919, Lütjens' posting with the Sea Transportation Agency ended and he was posted to the Coastal Defence Department III and later IV in Cuxhaven-Lehe as a company leader. (Note: Coastal Defence Department—Küstenwehrabteilung) (Note: company leader—Kompanieführer) As of 1 January 1921 he was also subordinated to the Staff of the North Sea. Lütjens was posted to the Fleet Department of the Naval Command on 7 June 1921. (Note: Naval Command—Marineleitung) His commanding officer here was Admiral Paul Behncke. Here Lütjens served as the head of the Fleet Department until the end of September 1923. (Note: head of department—Dezernent) In this position, Lütjens dealt with strategic and naval policy issues. This included the observation and analysis of the Washington Naval Conference and its disarmament agreements. On 4 October 1923 he returned to the torpedo force, taking command of the 3rd Torpedo-Boat-Demi-Flotilla.

On 26 September 1925 he became 1st adjutant of the Marinestation der Nordsee. He served in this position until 2 October 1929. Here he was promoted to Korvettenkapitän (Lieutenant Commander) on 1 April 1926. This assignment was interrupted for a posting to the sailing yacht Asta (1–31 August 1926) and again for a short torpedo course for staff officers at the torpedo school in Mürwik (5–9 December 1927). On 21 April 1928 he participated in a training exercise on Schlesien, then under the command of Alfred Saalwächter, which ended on 28 April. From 14 to 18 August 1928 he boarded Schlesien again for a torpedo firing exercise. On 3 October 1929 Lütjens took command as head of the 1st Torpedo-Boat-Flotilla in Swinemünde (present-day Świnoujście) which he commanded until 17 September 1931. This posting was interrupted by a number of training courses, the first for staff officers (9–12 January 1930), a torpedo course (3–8 February 1930), for commanders and staff officers in leadership positions (2–7 February 1931) and lastly a navigation course (16–21 February 1931).

Lütjens was called by Admiral Erich Raeder into the Naval Command of the Ministry of the Reichswehr on 17 September 1931. (Note: Ministry of the Reichswehr—Reichswehrministerium) Shortly after he was assigned to the Ministry of the Reichswehr he was promoted to Fregattenkapitän (Commander) on 1 October 1931. In the Naval Command Lütjens first served as Department Head of the Fleet- and Naval Officer Personnel Department. (Note: Fleet- and Naval Officer Personnel Department—Flotten- und Marineoffizierspersonalabteilung) On 26 September 1932 he was appointed chief of this department, a function that Lütjens held until the mid-September 1934. He advanced in rank to Kapitän zur See (Captain) on 1 July 1933.

=== Nazi Germany ===
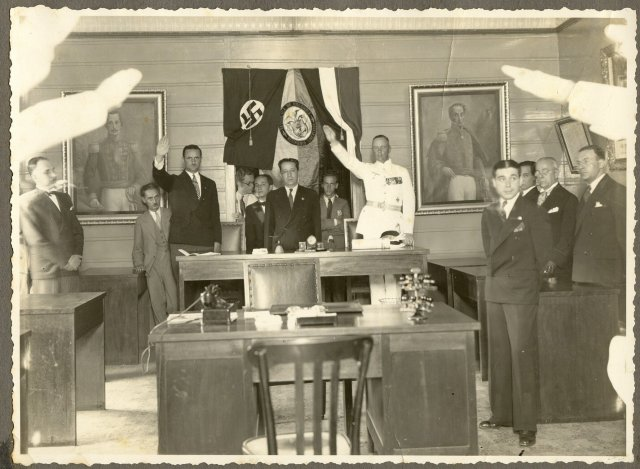
Günther Lütjens in visit to Cali, Colombia 1935

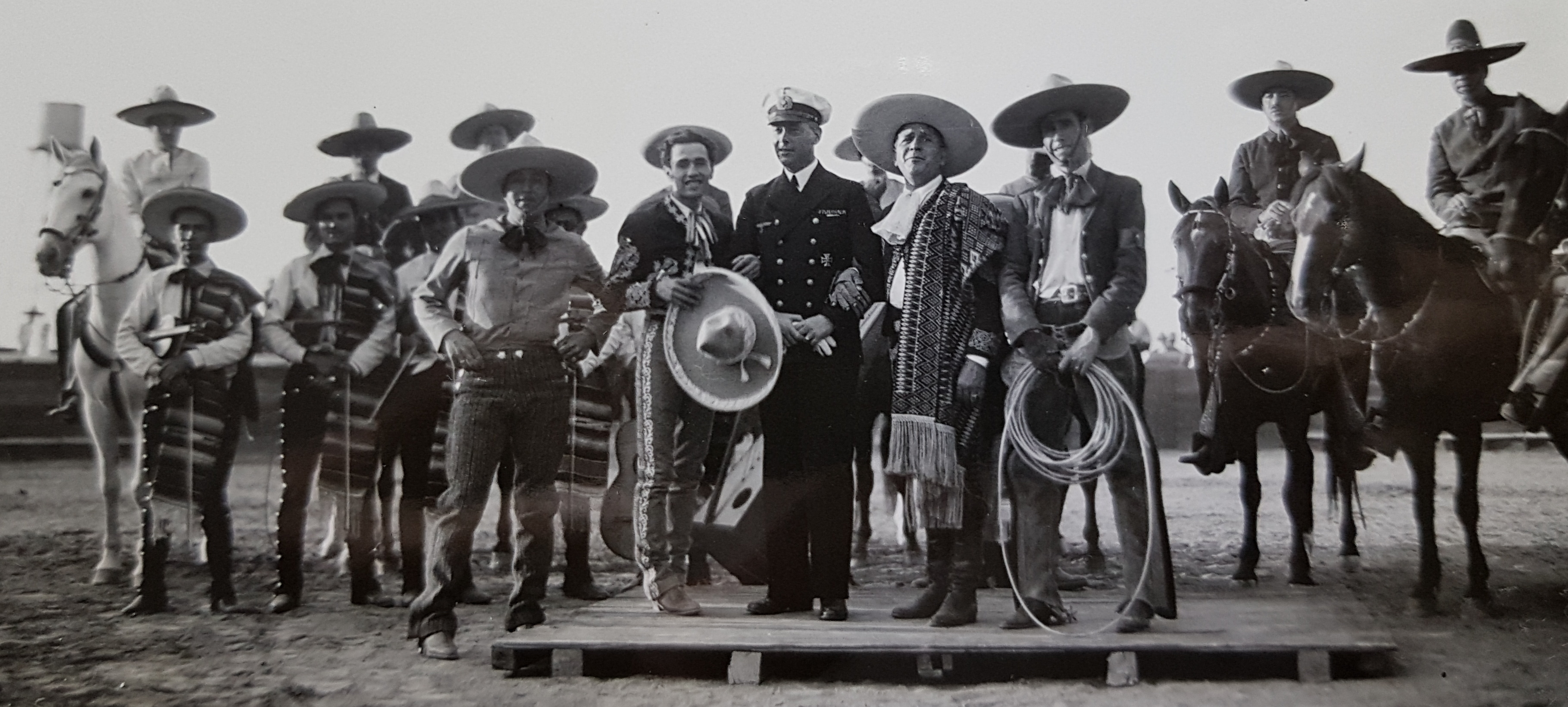
Günther Lütjens in visit to Mexico in 1935

On 30 January 1933, the Nazi Party, under the leadership of Adolf Hitler, came to power in Germany, and began to rearm its forces, including the Navy. In 1935, the Reichsmarine was renamed the Kriegsmarine.

On 16 September 1933, Lütjens received command of Karlsruhe and sailed around the world for good will visits. (Note: Taken from a written statement by Lütjens to the crew and Karlsruhe press) Burkard Freiherr von Müllenheim-Rechberg, the most senior officer to survive Bismarck's last battle, was an officer cadet on Karlsruhe at the time of Lütjens' command. Lütjens took Karlsruhe on its fourth training cruise. Karlsruhe left Kiel on 22 October 1934. The ship sailed via Skagen, the Azores and Trinidad on the east coast of South America, passed the Cape Horn, up the west coast of South, Middle and North America to Vancouver. At Callao (25 January – 6 February 1935) they joined in the 400-year celebration of Peru. Karlsruhe returned to Kiel on 15 June 1935, travelling through the Panama Canal to Houston, Charlestown and Vigo, Spain.

Lütjens first met Karl Dönitz, future Commander-in-Chief of the Kriegsmarine in Vigo in June 1935. At that point, Dönitz had been entrusted with the rebuilding of the U-boat Arm but had spent the summer at sea commanding Emden. After arriving at port, he met with Raeder. Raeder informed Dönitz that:

Lütjens is to become chief of the Officer Personnel Branch at Naval Headquarters with the task of forming an officer Corps for the new Navy we are about to build.

In 1936, Lütjens was appointed Chief of the Personnel Office of the Kriegsmarine, an office which he had served in 1932–34, and in 1937, he became Führer der Torpedoboote (Chief of Torpedo Boats), with Z1 Leberecht Maass as his flagship, and was promoted to Konteradmiral on 1 October 1937. While in command of personnel department he did nothing to enforce the Nuremberg Laws on race in the Kriegsmarine. In November 1938, Lütjens was one of only three flag officers, including Dönitz, who protested in writing to Raeder, Commander-in-Chief of the navy, against the anti-Jewish Kristallnacht pogroms.

His successor at the Marinepersonalamt Conrad Patzig, described Lütjens as a dedicated naval officer who put his service to the nation ahead of the ruling party. He also described him as a difficult man to know. Austere, rather forbidding, he said little and when he did, confined his remarks to the essentials. Patzig said of him "one of the ablest officers in the service, very logical and shrewd, incorruptible in his opinions and an engaging personality when you got to know him." Few did. Lütjens's dedication to his officer principles meant he did not marry until he was 40, adhering to a code that an officer would marry only when he was able to support a wife.

== World War II ==
At the outbreak of World War II, Lütjens was Commander of Scouting Forces—Befehlshaber der Aufklärungsstreitkräfte (B.d.A.)—made up of German destroyers, torpedo boats and cruisers. On 1 September 1939 Germany invaded Poland and two days later, Lütjens sailing aboard his flagship, Z1 Leberecht Maass and Z9 Wolfgang Zenker took part in an attack on the Polish ships Gryf and Wicher in Gdynia harbour. Lütjens attacked from a range of 14,000 yards south-east of the harbour. The Poles replied effectively and forced the German destroyers to make evasive manoeuvres and to lay a smoke screen to throw off the aim of the Polish gunners. Leberecht Maass was hit in the superstructure by a 152-millimeter (6.0 in) shell from the coast defence battery at Hel that killed four crewmen and wounded another four men. Lütjens ordered the action broken off 40 minutes later as the German fire was ineffective. Lütjens ordered the group to Pillau to refuel and the Leberecht Maas sailed to Swinemünde for repairs.

On 17 October 1939 Lütjens led a raiding sortie into the North Sea. On board his flagship Z21 Wilhelm Heidkamp, he led six destroyers laden with naval mines. His own ship did not carry any mines and acted as cover. They reached the Humber Estuary undetected and departed unseen. Within days shipping losses began occurring among British transports in the area. Lütjens did not repeat the operation. He was promoted to Vizeadmiral on 1 January 1940 and moved with his staff to the cruiser Nürnberg.

=== Operation Weserübung ===
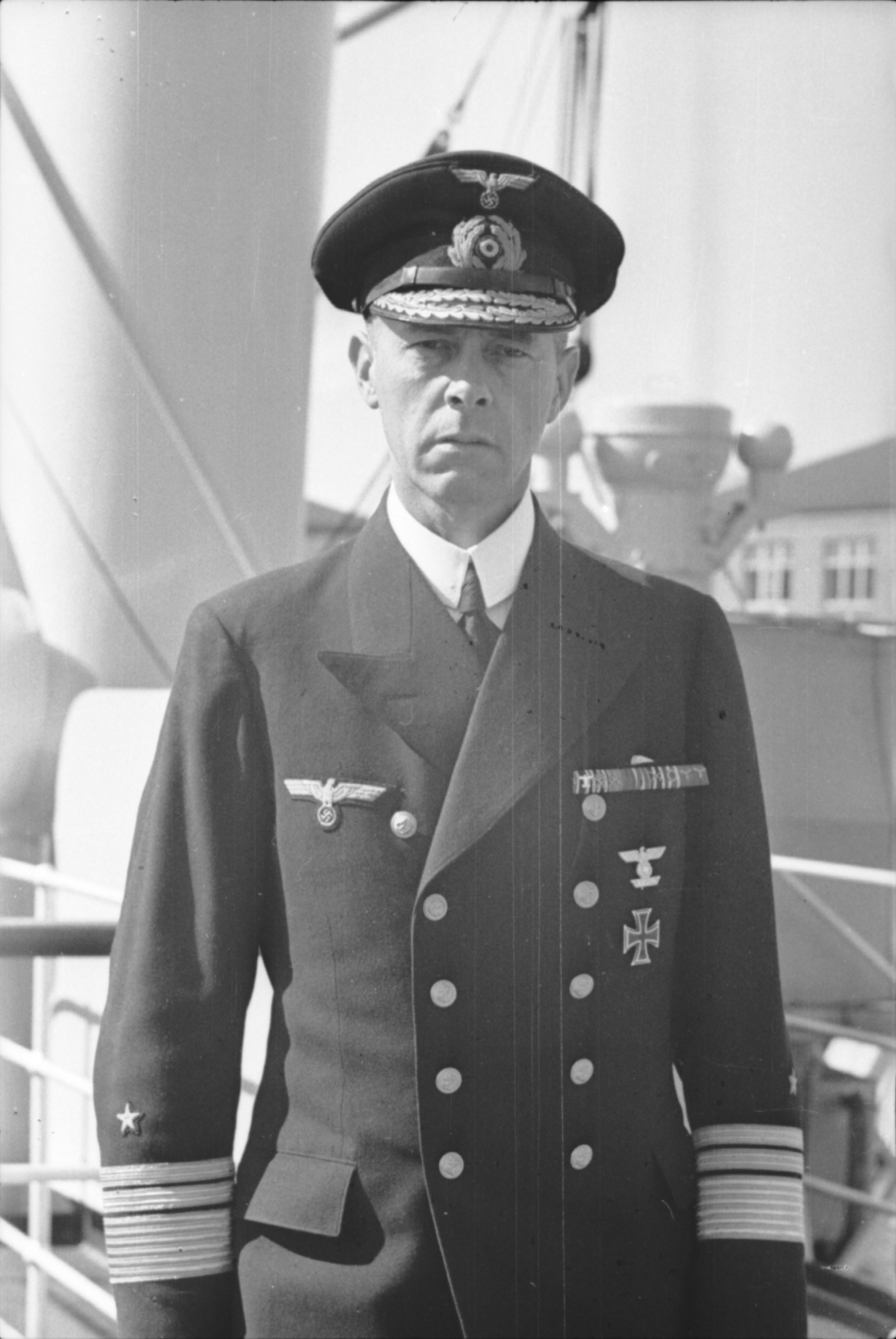
Vice Admiral Lütjens in April, 1940

In April 1940, during the invasion of Denmark and Norway (Operation Weserübung), he served as Vizeadmiral (vice admiral), commanding the distant cover forces in the North Sea—which consisted of Scharnhorst and Gneisenau. His superior, Vizeadmiral Wilhelm Marschall, had fallen ill just before the operation, so he assumed command of the Narvik and Trondheim landings.

Lütjens was to lead Scharnhorst and Gneisenau, with his flag in the latter, on escort operation for a force of 10 destroyers commanded by Führer der Zerstörer (Leader of Destroyers) Friedrich Bonte. The fleet was laden with soldiers belonging to the 3. Gebirgs-Division under the command of Eduard Dietl. The division was to seize Narvik. Lütjens briefed his officers aboard Gneisenau on 6 April in the presence of Raeder. Lütjens had his doubts about the wisdom of the entire operation but he showed no sign of his feelings to his subordinates. Lütjens hoped for bad weather to shield the fleet from Allied aircraft. The skies were clear and the ships were twice attacked by RAF Coastal Command bombers without result. The British airmen reported their position and surprise was now gone. Nevertheless, Lütjens remained on schedule and delivered the force to Narvik. On two occasions a sailor was swept overboard but Lütjens' operations officer, Heinrich Gerlach, noted: "No rescue attempts were made. On no account was there to be any interruption of the time schedule."

Lütjens' mission then was to draw British units away from Narvik and facilitate the landings there and prevent the Royal Navy from attacking the destroyers and landing craft. During the landing phase, his forces were approached by a Royal Navy task-force led by the battlecruiser HMS Renown. The British ship engaged at 05:05 and Lütjens was forced to fight an inconclusive battle with Renown. Lütjens succeeded in extracting the German vessels without incurring major battle damage. He viewed his operation as a success. Lütjens nearly changed his mind during the battle, believing a pitched fight may bring relief to the German destroyer force at Narvik—a force which he had effectively been forced to abandon in the face of enemy sea superiority. But the prospect of running into HMS Rodney, now known by German naval intelligence to be in the vicinity, was too much of a risk. In the resultant Battles of Narvik 10 German destroyers were sunk and the campaign for the port lasted until June. Bonte was killed when his command ship, Wilhelm Heidkamp exploded.

It may have been possible for him to turn on and sink Renown by attacking from different directions, using Scharnhorst and Gneisenau, but the accompanying British destroyers were well placed to join the fight had he done so. His Commander-in-Chief, Raeder, endorsed his actions which would have placed him against a clear eastern horizon as opposed to an enemy that was positioned against a darkened western horizon. Action at that time would have given the enemy a clearer silhouette to aim at while obscuring the British ships somewhat. Moreover, if either German ship had been immobilised by Renown they would have been vulnerable to a torpedo attack by the British destroyers. Under those circumstances, Raeder felt the British would have had a tactical advantage. Lütjens later rendezvoused with the cruiser Admiral Hipper and reached Wilhelmshaven on 12 April, having avoided a major fleet action.

Lütjens was indirectly involved in another battle. The Trondheim force was led by the heavy cruiser Admiral Hipper who detached the German destroyers Z11 Bernd von Arnim and Z18 Hans Lüdemann to search for a man that had been washed over board. In the heavy fog they ran into HMS Glowworm. Glowworm outmatched the lighter German vessels and they disengaged and called for help. Lütjens ordered Hipper to assist. The heavy cruiser sank the Glowworm, but not before the British ship had rammed her larger assailant and caused her considerable damage. When Lütjens stepped ashore at Wilhelmshaven, his decision to abandon Bonte's destroyer group at Narvik weighed heavily on his mind. In the wake of Lütjens return, he learned Marschall had recovered to assume command.

=== Commander of the fleet ===
In June and July 1940, he became Commander of Battleships and the third Flottenchef (Fleet Commander) of the Kriegsmarine, a position comparable to the British Commander-in-Chief of the Home Fleet. His predecessor—Vizeadmiral Wilhelm Marschall—had had repeated differences with Raeder over the extent the Flottenchef should be bound by orders while operating at sea. Marschall led Scharnhorst and Gneisenau to intercept Allied naval forces withdrawing from Norway against orders. On 8 June 1940 he engaged and sank the aircraft carrier Glorious and her escorting destroyers Acasta and Ardent. During the battle Scharnhorst was heavily damaged by a torpedo. Marschall was dismissed by Raeder because the Commander-in-Chief of the Kriegsmarine deemed the episode unacceptable. Raeder viewed the sinkings as "target practice" and the damage to Scharnhorst, and consequently Gneisenau, offset this victory in his view.

Ten days later Lütjens was given command of the fleet on a temporary basis. Raeder regarded Lütjens as a sound tactician, excellent staff officer and a leader with all-important operational and battle experience. After the war Raeder was candid about his decision to elevate Lütjens through the chain of command. Raeder said of his progression, "He had also experience in staff work, and as my Chief of Personnel he had won by special confidence in years of close association." Raeder expressed his confidence that Lütjens displayed wise judgment and was unlikely to act rashly. When at sea, he allowed him to take command of the situation and make operational decisions at his own discretion. Although described as reserved and unapproachable toward subordinates, he was held to be "of manifest integrity and reliability." Hitler expressed his gratitude to Lütjens for "preparing and leading the Navy into action", and awarded him the Knight's Cross of the Iron Cross (Ritterkreuz des Eisernen Kreuzes) on 14 June 1940.

Scharnhorst had been forced to make for Trondheim in the aftermath of the action for emergency repairs. Flying his flag in Gneisenau, Lütjens took command of his first voyage as Flottenchef aboard a capital ship. On 20 June 1940 he sailed in company with Admiral Hipper, toward the North Sea in the hope of diverting attention from Scharnhorst while it made the perilous trek from Norway to Germany. The operation succeeded, but Gneisenau was torpedoed by the submarine HMS Clyde and severely damaged.

Battle plan for Operation Sea Lion.

In July 1940 Hitler ordered the preparation for Operation Sea Lion, the invasion of the United Kingdom after the victory in France. While the Luftwaffe engaged the Royal Air Force (RAF) in what became known as the Battle of Britain to clear the skies the German naval command began planning for an assault in southern England. Lütjens, as fleet commander, was responsible for carrying out sea operations based upon the strategies devised by his superior Saalwächter, who commanded Naval Group West. Saalwächter answered to the commander-in-chief, Raeder.

Lütjens was to be heavily involved in the planning of the sea landings. The navy wished to land on a narrow front because of its limited resources and Lütjens planned accordingly. He established himself in the fashionable market-town of Trouville near Le Havre. The enormous logistical effort that required the navy to move personnel command structures and personnel to France meant that his command post did not become fully operational until August 1940. Friedrich Ruge was appointed to the mine command by Lütjens with the task of clearing British naval minefields and laying German mine zones to impede the operations of the Royal Navy. Meanwhile, Lütjens scoured the continent for the 1,800 river barges, 500 tugs, 150 steamships and 1,200 motor boats deemed necessary for the operation. Some 24,000 men were seconded from other services and trained as landing craft crewman.

Lütjens was handicapped by the lack of firepower in the German navy. He authorised Ruge to organise the landings. The Advanced Detachments (Vorausabteilungen) were to storm the beach in battalion-strength. The following craft would clear mines allowing for artillery coasters and tugs carrying the Panzer units to follow unhindered. The smaller motor boats would unload engineers to clear obstacles and act as shuttle boats between the larger vessels and the beach. They would rush to and fro delivering army units to land in order to expand the beachhead and allow the flotilla to land its full complement. Lütjens recommended using the old battleships Schlesien and Schleswig-Holstein as fire support to protect the crossing. Lütjens favoured beaching the ships on the Varne Bank to act as a gun-fire platform. He thought they could best act as strong points to deny passage through the Strait of Dover to the British. Raeder agreed but the plan was rubbished by technical experts who argued the old ships were too prone to capsizing and their stationary posture was too vulnerable and their armament too weak to do the job effectively.

Lütjens continued planning preparations as the Battle of Britain raged. By September - Lütjens was promoted to Admiral on 1 September - he had completed plans to land the entire German 16th Army under Ernst Busch between Deal and Hastings—the site of the last successful invasion of England in 1066—and the German 9th Army between Hastings and Worthing to the west. Lütjens' opinion on the chances of success are not known. The battles in Norway had left him without any major capital ship. In the event, Lütjens was never tested. The air battle over Britain was lost and by the end of 1940 plans for an invasion were postponed as Hitler turned eastward for a campaign against the Soviet Union. German naval strategy now turned to thoughts of siege and destroying Britain's shipping lanes which supplied the country from overseas and in particular North America.

=== Operation Berlin ===
Scharnhorst and Gneisenau were readied for action again by the winter. Their task now was to engage Allied merchant vessels bringing war materials to Britain. As fleet commander, it would be Lütjens' first operation in the Battle of the Atlantic. It was named Operation Berlin. On 28 December 1940, Scharnhorst and Gneisenau—on which Admiral Lütjens had raised his flag—left Germany for an Atlantic raid. However, due to weather, Lütjens ordered a return to port: Gneisenau to Kiel and Scharnhorst to Gdynia. While repairs were carried out Navy Group West emphasised to him that his primary targets were enemy merchant vessels. Lütjens reiterated his standing orders to his captains: "our job is to put as many as possible under the water".

On 22 January 1941, the renewed mission was delayed for several days owing to the sighting of British ships near the Norwegian coast and the inability of submarine chasers and destroyers to escort them to the Arctic Ocean. Lütjens chose to pass between Iceland and the Faroe Islands. Unbeknownst to Lütjens, his ships had been spotted sailing past Zealand, Denmark, by British agents. British Commander-in-Chief, Home Fleet, Admiral John Tovey was alerted and dispatched three battleships, eight cruisers, and 11 destroyers to hunt for the German ships accordingly, hoping to intercept the Germans off southern Iceland. The cruiser Naiad briefly sighted the German ships on 28 January as Lütjens prepared to break through the Iceland-Faroe gap, and reported their position. The German admiral quickly decided to retire northbound with the intention of passing through the Denmark Strait. On 30 January Lütjens decided to refuel from the tanker Thorn off Jan Mayen island before attempting this breakout route. After refueling, Lütjens sailed, and on 4 February, slipped into the Atlantic. Fortunately for Lütjens, Tovey dismissed the sighting by Naiad as an illusion, and returned to port.

==== Free in the Atlantic ====
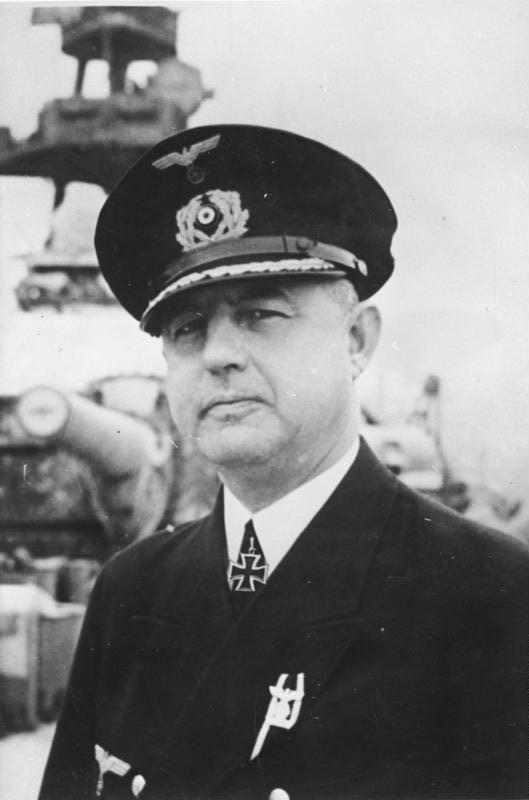
Captain Hoffmann. A former pupil and companion to Lütjens on Berlin.

Lütjens now had the operational initiative. He had a choice of two potential killing-grounds. To the north lay the HX and SC convoys which sailed between Britain and Canada. To the south the SL and OG convoys which operated between Britain, Gibraltar and Freetown. He decided to opt for operations in the north. He used Admiral Hipper, at that moment also loose in the Atlantic, to create a diversion by ordering her to the south. In retrospect it was an error of judgment. Lütjens' orders were to avoid combat on equal terms. He had not realised—and was not to know—that southern convoys were virtually undefended at this point in the war, but on orders of the British Admiralty, all northern convoys had an escort of at least one capital ship. German intelligence had warned him that Ramillies and Revenge were based at Halifax, Nova Scotia. He estimated that they could escort convoys only 1,000 miles (1,600 kilometres) east of their base, and so he began to search for targets with this in mind.

On 8 February, B-Dienst alerted the German warships of convoy HX 106 which sailed from Halifax, Nova Scotia on 31 January. Lütjens planned a pincer movement converging from the north and south. The convoy was escorted by Ramillies armed with eight 15-inch guns. When the battleship was sighted Lütjens strictly followed the Seekriegsleitung's directive not to engage enemy capital ships.

Kurt-Caesar Hoffmann, captain of Scharnhorst, attempted to draw off the British battleship, so that Gneisenau could sink the merchant vessels. Lütjens, however, did not understand Hoffmann's intentions which the Scharnhorst captain was not able to communicate in detail in such short-order. A heated radio conversation followed in which Lütjens accused him of disobeying orders because he did not turn away immediately. The enemy ship did not leave the convoy and now Lütjens complained the British would be alerted to their position and as a consequence, successful attacks would now be more difficult to execute. In fact, Lütjens' fears were unfounded and luck was once again on his side. The British had sighted only one German ship. Since Hipper was known to be at sea, it was assumed she was the German vessel lurking around the convoy. Tovey's dismissal of the Naiad report masked the German ships' presence. Tovey still believed they were still in German ports. The disagreement did not adversely damage the two men's good relations. (Note: Richard Garrett, a naval researcher, interviewed Hoffmann in 1976. Hoffmann stated he respected Lütjens, who had been his gunnery instructor as a sea cadet in 1912.)

The ships rendezvoused between Iceland and Canada with the tankers Esso Hamburg and Schlettstadt on 15 February. On 22 February, after seven days of fruitless searching some 500 nautical miles east of Newfoundland, German radar picked up five cargo-empty ships from a westbound convoy sailing without escort towards American ports. The convoy identified the German ships and soon the radio waves were busy with signals sent from the frantic British merchantmen, which tried to disperse. The battleships quickly closed and sank four. A further ship, the 5,500-ton Harlesden, carried a powerful Wireless set but temporarily evaded them. Intent on silencing it, Lütjens dispatched his Arado Ar 196 to locate it. Upon his return, the Arado pilot reported to have found it and claimed to have destroyed the aerial, but took damage from return fire. Its position now known, the German ships closed in and sank Harlesden at 23:00. The day's haul amounted to around 25,000 tons. On a negative note, the chase and action occurred at long range and the expenditure of ammunition was expensive. Lütjens used his radio for the first time since 8 February and commanded the supply ships Esso Hamburg and Schlettstadt to meet him near the Azores so he could replenish stocks. On 26 February he unloaded 180 prisoners of war onto the tankers Ermland and Friedrich Breme. In the action of 22 February, only 11 Allied sailors had become casualties.

Disappointed with the lack of targets in the north, Lütjens' ships then sailed to the coast of West Africa. On 3 March 1941 they reached the Cape Verde Islands. On 5 March he attempted to dispatch his aircraft to find enemy shipping but found it four hours later, the machine having run out of fuel. Lütjens' persistence paid off. At 23:00 on 5 March, he received a wireless message from Germany informing him U-124 had spotted two large ships close to their position. The Arado had flown over the submarine, which had been alerted to the possibility German commerce raiders might be in the area. On 7 March, the convoy SL-67, escorted by the battleship HMS Malaya, was sighted. Once again, Lütjens obeyed his orders and not his instinct. He withdrew, but shadowed the convoy, directing U-124 and U-105 onto the enemy. The former sank four and the latter one ship. Lütjens ran into the convoy again as darkness fell, but the Germans turned away to meet with their supply ships, narrowly avoiding a battle with Malaya. On the way the Greek ship Marathon (7,926 tons gross register tons (GRT)) was sunk. It was carrying coal to Alexandria.

==== Escape to France ====
On 11 March he received a message from Group West. Admiral Scheer and Hipper were to operate in the north, and German intelligence were alerted to the possibility of a British force consisting of the British Mediterranean Fleet were on a westerly course from Gibraltar. Lütjens was required to create a diversion to allow Scheer safe passage through the Denmark Strait. He decided that the best way to attract British attention was to head for Brest, France, via the HX convoy route. Lütjens decided to employ his entire force, supply ships too, in a search for victims. Stationed 30 miles abreast, they sailed between 39°N and 46°W. Lütjens intercepted the Norwegian tanker Bianca (5,688 GRT), the Polykarb (6,500 GRT) and British San Casimiro (8,000 GRT). He managed to capture the ships and his prize crews were ordered to Bordeaux. Only Polykarb made it. The others were scuttled by their German crews when approached by HMS Renown. Three more were sunk by the German battleships.

Supply ships Uckermark and Ermland signalled they had sighted another convoy. They acted as shepherds as they rushed at the startled merchantmen and drove them toward the German battleships. On 15 March Lütjens began his attack. Empire of Industry (formerly German), Mangkai (formerly the German Scheer), Silverfix, Demerton, Grandi, Royal Crown, Sardinian Prince and the French Myson were sunk. Among the company was Chilean Reefer. Only 1,800 tons, the ship made smoke and returned Gniesenau's fire. Believing it possibly disguised as an enemy cruiser, or a scout, the Germans withdrew to a safe distance and sank it with the main batteries. It was a small target which took 73 rounds to destroy. HMS Rodney appeared 15 minutes later and flashed a challenge. In Lütjens' mind, it confirmed his suspicions of the vessel as a scout. Lütjens identified Gneisenau as "HMS Emerald", buying time as he worked up to escape. It worked, and Rodney stayed to pick up the survivors from the Chilean Reefer. After transferring 200 prisoners, he set course for Brest, France. Sighted by an aircraft from HMS Ark Royal on 20 March, Admiral Lütjens managed to evade British warships, and reached Brest at 07:00 on 22 March. The journey of 17,800 nmi (20,500 mi; 33,000 km) in 59 days was a record for German capital ships.

Raeder was pleased with Lütjens. He described his operation in the Atlantic as "beyond reproach. He invariably judged the situation accurately and he met with deserved success." Raeder's glowing endorsement was likely caused by Lütjens' rigid adherence to his commander-in-chief's instructions. The Seekriegsleitung was more critical. It acknowledged the restrictions placed upon Lütjens but thought Lütjens could have asked for greater freedom of action after the encounter with Ramillies. The staff officers believed Hoffman's tactical assessment of the situation had been correct.

=== Operation Rheinübung ===
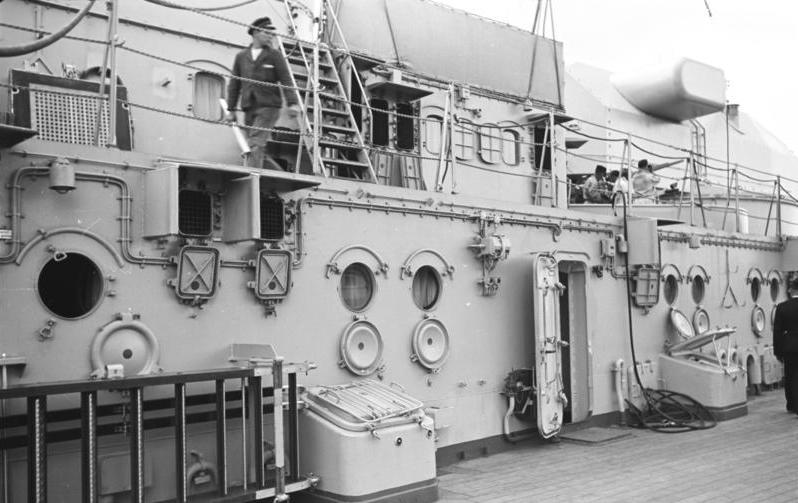
Bismarck's aft upper deck, behind turret "Caesar". This is where the living and working quarters of the admiral's staff were located.

Plans were then made for Lütjens to command Operation Rheinübung, taking all four modern German battleships—Bismarck, Tirpitz, Scharnhorst and Gneisenau—on a raid into the Atlantic. For various reasons, Tirpitz and the two other battleships could not be made ready for the operation, so it proceeded with only Bismarck and the heavy cruiser Prinz Eugen, under the command of Helmuth Brinkmann. The preparation and operational directives had been prepared by Marinegruppenkommando West, under the command of Generaladmiral Saalwächter and Marinegruppenkommando Ost, under the command of Generaladmiral Rolf Carls. On 8 April 1941, Lütjens met with Admiral Dönitz in Paris. Dönitz made the following assessment of the plan:

I met Admiral Lütjens, the Admiral commanding the fleet, in Paris. I knew Lütjens well and held him in high esteem. During the same years we had been in command of the cruisers Karlsruhe and Emden respectively. At the end of our overseas tours of duty we had returned to Germany in company. In the years immediately before the war, while I was senior Officer, submarines, Lütjens had been officer commanding Torpedo Boats. We were often together, both socially and on duty, we held the same views on naval matters and saw eye to eye in most things. At our conference in Paris we defined the support to be given to the Bismarck by U-boats in the following terms:

1. The U-boats would carry on as usual in their normal positions
2. If while the surface ships were at sea any opportunity arose for joint action with U-boats, every effort should be made to exploit it to the full. For this purpose an experienced U-boat Officer would be appointed for duty to the Bismarck.

3. On the radio frequency used by the U-boats, the Admiral commanding the fleet would be kept constantly informed of the dispositions of the boats and the intentions of the U-boat Command.

==== Lütjens' view ====
Raeder was anxious to begin the operation during the new moon on 26 April. His wishes were frustrated by a series of mishaps. Prinz Eugen was repeatedly delayed from becoming fully operational. Royal Air Force (RAF) bombing, a practice torpedo, and a mine detonation delayed her from mid-April until mid-May. Raeder used this time to consult with his fleet commander. Lütjens travelled to Berlin on 26 April 1941 to meet with him. For a time, Lütjens tried without success to change Raeder's mind, and to wait until Tirpitz, Scharnhorst and Gneisenau were ready. He argued that the German fleet should not be fed "teaspoon by teaspoon" into battle with the enemy.

Lütjens was, however, encouraged by his commander-in-chief to proceed and he eventually decided that an operation should begin as soon as possible to prevent the enemy's gaining any respite. He accepted that the current situation meant that German capital ships must be present in the Atlantic. Although Raeder insisted on the operation, he advised Lütjens to act thoughtfully and carefully without taking too high a risk. Raeder did, however, admonish his subordinate to one end: if he were brought to battle despite his best efforts, it should be conducted with full force, to the end. He gave Lütjens full freedom of action, since only he was in a position to judge the immediate situation while at sea. Raeder later wrote, "It does Lütjens great credit that he did not hesitate to express this view to me so frankly. I then sought to convince him of the cogency of my arguments....Although Lütjens was perhaps not entirely convinced by my views, our discussion ended in complete understanding."

Lütjens sought advice from several colleagues and friends. First, he spoke with Kurt Fricke, Raeder's chief of operations. When Fricke inquired as to what he would do if approached by overwhelming force: Lütjens replied he would run for home. As far as the Naval Command was concerned, this was his policy. He sought out his friend, Patzig, who had commanded Admiral Graf Spee, and a man he had known since 1907. Patzig argued he should remain in port. He remarked that it was folly to risk the chief of the fleet in a limited operation with a single capital ship. Lütjens agreed, but feared being labelled a coward if he turned down the command. His parting words to Patzig were fatalistic:

Given the uneven relation of forces I am of the opinion that I should have to sacrifice myself sooner or later. I have closed out my private life and am determined to carry out the assignment given to me honourably, one way or another.

Following this meeting, Lütjens confided to Vizeadmiral Hans-Erich Voss, then working at Raeder's headquarters, that "survival was improbable", and bade him farewell. (Note: full quote: "I want to say goodbye, I will not come back. Given the superiority of the British survival is unlikely"—Ich möchte mich verabschieden, ich werde nicht wiederkommen. Bei der Überlegenheit der Briten ist ein Überleben unwahrscheinlich.)

Lastly he met with his former commanding officer in Norway, Marschall. He advised Lütjens not to follow Raeder's orders too closely since the situation in the Atlantic could change at any moment. Lütjens would not hear of it. He refused to diverge from his standing orders. He reminded Marschall that two fleet commanders had already been removed from command—Marschall being one of them—and that he would follow the orders given him. What depressed Lütjens's already darkened mood was Ernst Lindemann, Bismarck's captain, had been told by Karl Topp of the Marineamt, that several war games were run to see if Tirpitz could reach the Atlantic undetected and that at every turn and under every circumstance, the ship was discovered. Lindemann certainly would have passed this information to Lütjens.

Lütjens' staff for Operation Rheinübung was made up of the following officers:

Name	Rank	Role
Harald Netzbandt	Kapitän zur See	Chief of Staff
Emil Melms	Kapitän zur See	2nd Admiral Staff Officer, Artillery Officer of the Fleet, Personnel Officer
Dr. Hans-Releff Riege	Flottenarzt (posthumously Admiralarzt)	Doctor with the Fleet Commando
Helmut Marschall	Hauptregierungsrat of the Reserves	Meteorologist
Paul Ascher	Fregattenkapitän	1st Admiral Staff Officer
Karl Thannemann	Fregattenkapitän (Ing.) (posthumously Kapitän (Ing.))	Fleet Engineer
Dr. Eduard Langer	Marineoberkriegsgerichtsrat	Fleet Judge
Hans Nitzschke	Korvettenkapitän	4th Admiral Staff Officer
Dr. Heinz Externbrink	Hilfsregierungsrat	Meteorologist
Heinrich Schlüter	Marinebaurat	

==== Operational decisions ====
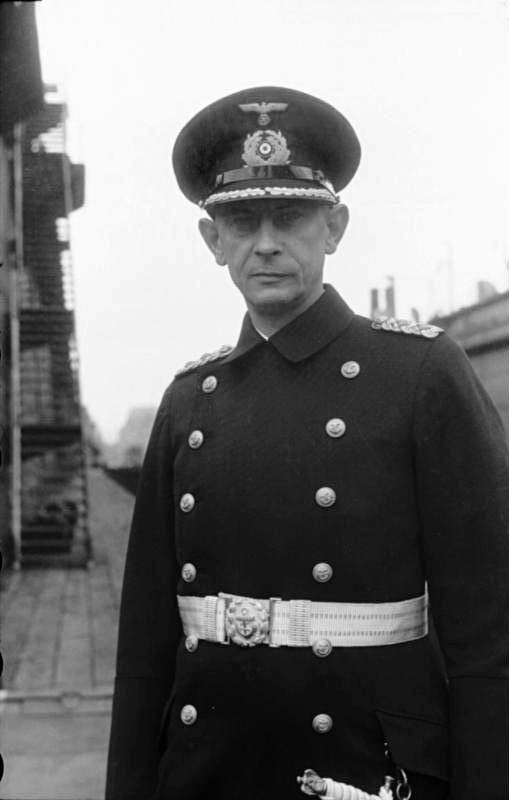
Ernst Lindemann, the captain of the Bismarck

On 18 May the operation began. Lütjens had informed Lindemann and Brinkmann on 18 May that he intended to sail for the arctic and refuel at sea. Three days later, in Norwegian waters, Lütjens ordered a fuel stop in a Grimstadfjord near Bergen. He did not inform either Lindemann or Brinkmann about the decision to drop anchor and refuel. As was his custom, he offered no explanation for changing his mind.

While Prinz Eugen was refuelled, Lütjens declined to top up the Bismarck. A rupture in one of the fuel lines had allowed only an initial influx of 6,000 tons. A further 2,000 tons was to be accepted at sea. The ship had left the Baltic 200 tons short, and had since burned 1,000 tons reaching Norway. Lütjens knew that the German tanker Weissenberg was waiting for him in the Arctic, only an additional day's sailing away, but farther from prying British eyes. It was perhaps his intention to replenish there. In the event he did not refuel during the operation.

The following day, on 22 May, he received a report that four British battleships, perhaps an aircraft carrier, and a strong escort of destroyers were still anchored at Scapa Flow. Although mistaken, it appears to have influenced Lütjens' decision not to loiter and wait for events to unfold, but to proceed with a breakout immediately which would not permit time for refueling prior to reaching the Atlantic. This faulty intelligence report likely dispelled any doubts Lütjens had about his chosen route. The move would bring about the first of several disagreements with Captain Lindemann. Lindemann preferred the route south of Iceland, but once again Lütjens and his terse style had prevailed.

He also declined Generaladmiral Carls' desire for a breakout through the more southerly Faroe Islands-Iceland gap. As usual, he gave no explanation for any change in operational direction. While the ice-flooded regions of northern Iceland and the Denmark Strait could be easily patrolled by the enemy, as believed by Carls, it offered lower-visibility conditions, giving him much needed cover. Nevertheless, he continued to frustrate his junior officers. Meteorologist Heinz Externbrink suggested increasing speed to keep up with the fast-moving cloud affording him cover. Lütjens declined without comment, and Externbrink vented his anger to Burkard Freiherr von Müllenheim-Rechberg, the most senior officer to survive the operation. Despite his intentions, the British were alerted to the task force's operation by the Swedes, Norwegian Resistance and aerial reconnaissance.

Lindemann remained on edge. As captain, he was privy to the B-Dienst naval intelligence now reaching him on enemy movements. A large contingent of enemy capital ships was congregating at Scapa Flow. His senior medical officer, Dr. Otto Schneider, observed that Lindemann fully understood the dangers his ship faced. But Admiral Lütjens alone could call off the operation. He showed no desire to discuss his intentions with either Captain Lindemann or Brinkmann, which put both of them on edge. Lütjens offered no hint of intentions either to his destroyer escort, which he dismissed near Trondheim, or to Generaladmiral Carls. Carls openly displayed his displeasure at the lack of communication, believing Lütjens to be hesitant. Not until the evening of 22 May did he share his intention to breach the Denmark Strait with his captains; perhaps encouraged in the knowledge that the British Force H would now be engaged in the beginning Battle of Crete. The foul weather gave him the cover he needed. Foregoing the chance of a refuel, he headed due west, north of Iceland.

Lütjens remained unaware that the British were tracking him until 23 May, when his ships encountered heavy cruisers HMS Norfolk and Suffolk, amidst the Greenland ice pack. Lütjens received the identity of the first ship as the latter vessel. He gave the code JOTDORA: permission to fire. Although shots were fired, no serious damage resulted to either side, and the outgunned British cruisers quickly withdrew, though they remained within radar range and continued to shadow the German ships. The shock from the firing of Bismarck's heavy guns disabled her search radar, so Lütjens ordered Prinz Eugen to take the lead. As they passed each other Bismarck's electric push-button wheel jammed and it veered toward the German cruiser. The quick thinking of Brinkmann avoided a collision. During a raining squall Lütjens attempted a 180-degree turn to surprise his attackers, but the British radar detected the manoeuvre and withdrew. Lütjens could not shake his pursuers. He believed they possessed a new type of radar as yet unknown to the Germans.

==== Tactical command in battle ====
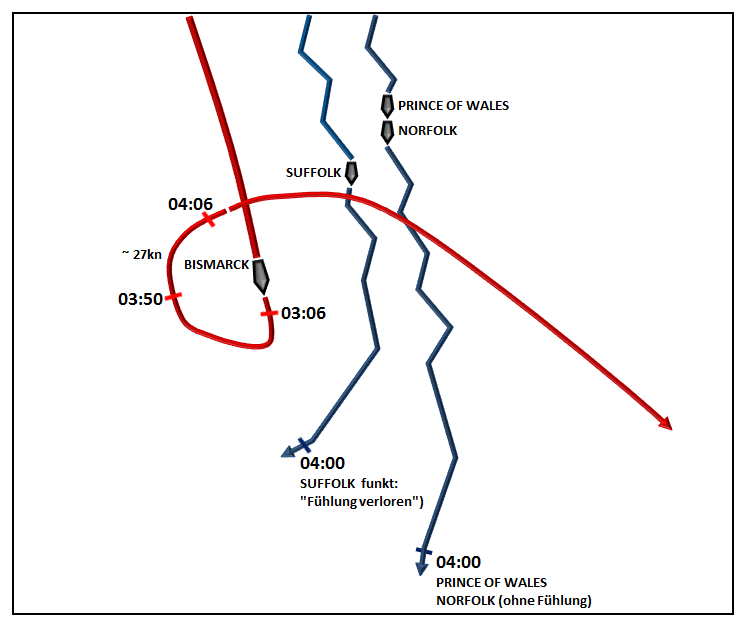
Bismarck's 3/4 clockwise turn on 25 May. Lütjens' tactic was highly successful, shaking free of his pursuers.

In the early hours of 24 May 1941, Prinz Eugen's hydrophones detected two large ships approaching. Vice Admiral Lancelot Holland in his flagship battlecruiser HMS Hood and battleship HMS Prince of Wales were heading towards them. It began the Battle of the Denmark Strait. Lütjens was soon informed that the two ships were enemy heavy units by the size of their superstructure, but remained unaware of their identity until they adjusted their attitude. Confronted with enemy combat vessels, Lütjens turned away, to gain time to think and plan a response to his opponents who were clearly attempting to engage him.

Lütjens' first instinct was to attempt to outrun the British ships, scrupulously obeying his orders. He became even more reluctant to accept battle once the lead enemy vessel was identified as Hood. Even after Hood began to fire on the two ships and it became obvious that an engagement was inevitable, Lütjens was reluctant to return fire. He ordered his chief yeoman to signal to Prinz Eugen to open fire on the lead enemy ship, but not Bismarck, much to the exasperation of Captain Lindemann, who had the prospect of suffering another disagreement with the Admiral.

First Gunnery Officer Adalbert Schneider, made multiple inquiries to return fire; methodically reporting enemy salvos and asking permission to fire. Lütjens, himself an artillery specialist, waited until the range fell. Moreover, the position of the British placed them at the outer limit of traverse for his main batteries, which were now inclined astern of the ship. Lütjens was also wary of using up heavy shells which were required for raiding operations and a possible future engagement. He could not afford to use up ammunition to register his guns, instead, preferring a closer-range battle. He waited for the optimum moment to fire back.

Some witnesses testify Captain Lindeman muttered, "I will not allow my ship to be shot out from under my arse. Open fire!". Finally Lütjens gave the order to return fire. Lütjens then ordered a turn to port, and crossed Holland's T, as his opponent turned to bring all the British guns to bear. Shortly before firing, Bismarck was hit in the forecastle, though Prinz Eugen had registered hits on Hood which had started a large series of fires making it easier for the Germans to home in on her position. Bismarck then targeted Hood.

Lütjens did not observe the German tactical regulations of the time, to place his weaker cruiser to his battleship's unengaged side and out of range. Instead, he kept her in the line to maximise his firepower even though both German ships were now firing salvos across each other's line-of-fire. Once the odds were reduced, he then ordered her to drop back and use her radar to keep a vigil on the British cruisers, still chasing the German force. Schneider observed the fifth salvo strike Hood from a range of 17,500 yards (16,000 metres). Two splashes were seen. Apparently one or more shells "bit into" Hood, seemingly without effect, leading the gunnery officers to believe it was a dud. Moments later Hood blew up, which caused much excitement on the German ships. Lütjens remained unmoved. The Germans then turned their fire to Prince of Wales, causing seven damaging hits and Captain John Leach to retreat to a safe distance.

Lindemann, guided by the tactical situation, wanted to destroy the damaged ship. He estimated a two- to three-hour chase would be enough. Lütjens, mindful of the fleet order to avoid unnecessary fighting with enemy capital ships, rejected his protests without discussion. Lütjens was suspicious of the intelligence he was receiving, which days earlier had told him Hood was standing off the coast of West Africa. He could no longer be sure of how many more enemy capital ships could be in the area. A time-consuming battle with Prince of Wales was out of the question, and he proceeded into the vast expanses of the Atlantic, where he could lose his pursuers and have the necessary room to manoeuvre.

Lütjens' tactics proved useful in two respects. After the Hood battle, he steamed directly at his pursuers, forcing them away, while his heavy cruiser escaped out of radar range. On 25 May, his 52nd birthday, despite constant action and exhaustion, he ordered a clever manoeuvre. He ordered full speed and then a three-quarter clockwise turn once his pursuers had reached the extremis of their radar range. The British cruisers had been performing zigzags to avoid German U-boats they believed to be in the vicinity. At the outer edge of their port turn, they would be at the limit of their radar's range. This allowed him to escape the enemy radar, steam in the opposite direction, and then once behind them steam across their wake and avoid enemy attempts to regain contact.

The move worked and he evaded the British for a short time. Lütjens then broke radio silence, allowing the British a rough idea of his latitude but not his longitude. He continued to believe he was being tracked. Naval Group West informed him to send only tactical radio signals and not risk broadcasting long radio messages to Paris since they were sure he had broken contact. Lütjens, already distrustful of B-Dienst, disregarded the warnings. Fortunately, not until late evening on 25 May, did the British realise he was heading for France. By this time Lütjens was well ahead of his pursuers. It proved, however, to be a grave error. Although the British made a number of mistakes in locating her, the intercepted message allowed them to send to air strikes against the ship over the next two days.

==== Leadership in crisis ====
Lütjens radioed Wilhelmshaven and Berlin and all the naval commands concerning the sinking of Hood continually until his message was acknowledged. It was received only at 14:40 in Berlin. Aboard Prinz Eugen Captain Brinkmann noted that such actions were dangerous. He recorded in the ships' war diary that Lütjens' insistence on radioing every change of course to the shore commands; then confirmed by a final "Execute!" order, was unnecessary and risky. In the morning of the 25 May, his 52nd birthday, Lütjens persisted by sending a long message on the Hood action. It was apparent that he mistakenly believed he was still under surveillance by the British and thus any message could do no harm since his position was known to the enemy.

The enemy, Brinkmann thought, could and would glean important intelligence from the most seemingly innocuous messages and consequently his fleet commander was foolish to issue them. At 08:01, once again without consulting Lindemann or Brinkmann, he radioed the Naval High Command his intent to sail to St. Nazaire and detach his heavy cruiser for commerce operations. No mention of the extent of the damage incurred by Bismarck was relayed to Germany. The ship was down by the bow, having been hit. The shell had severed the fuel lines to forward fuel tanks by allowing sea water to pour in through the hole located just above the waterline. In Germany, Raeder and his staff felt unable to issue Lütjens with any orders since they had no information on the state of the task force.

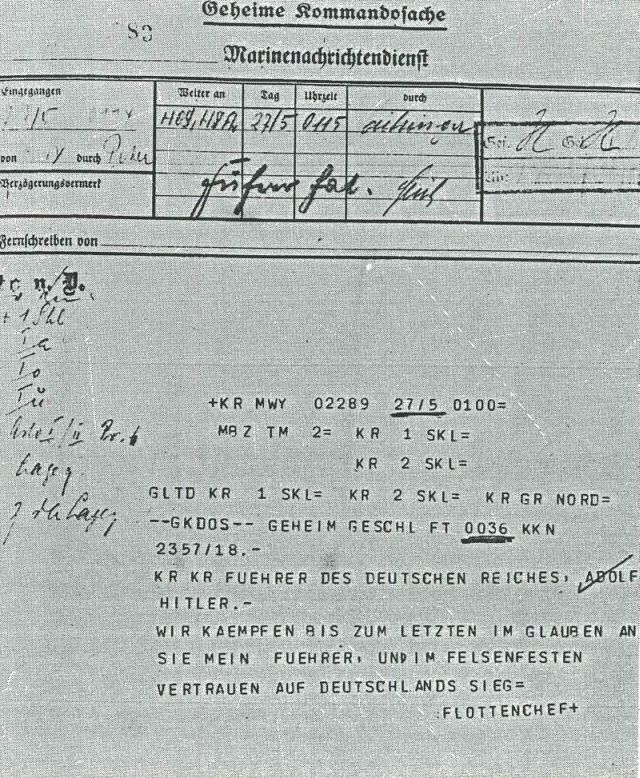
Lütjens' final message, informing the German command of his intention to fight to the last against the enemy.

Meanwhile, Lütjens took stock of his predicament. Firstly, he believed that he was shadowed by a force of ships with superior radar. Secondly, the element of surprise had been lost. Thirdly, the battleship was running low of fuel; his decision not to refuel in Norway or the Norwegian Sea now became relevant. Fourthly, he thought the force was led by the efficient battleship HMS King George V, which he thought was leading him into a trap with an enemy fleet alerted to Hood's fate. Fifthly, sea water had slowed him by two knots. His ship had lost some electrical power and salt water was threatening to enter fuel lines and shut down two boilers. Lindemann argued for a return via the Denmark Strait to Norway. In his view the ship was too fine a vessel to be risked in another unequal struggle. Lütjens rejected his suggestion. It would take him too close to the British Isles and expose him to the greatest concentration of enemy sea, air and coastal forces. According to survivors, the animosity between Lindemann and Lütjens was now beginning to extend to their respective staffs.

The reasons for Lütjens' decision to make for France instead of making the shorter journey to Norway remain unknown. It can be surmised he thought the ship would be repaired quickly and a French port was closer to his hunting ground which also precluded another tricky break out via the Denmark Strait. Furthermore, he had asked for a concentration of U-boats south of Greenland to attack his shadowers. The vast ocean also offered an opportunity to lose his pursuers. However, the perilous fuel situation forced him to abandon the U-boat option and steam directly for France. In light of these developments, Lütjens addressed the crew as follows:

Seamen of the battleship Bismarck! You have covered yourself with glory! The sinking of the battle cruiser Hood has not only military, but psychological value, for she was the pride of Great Britain. Henceforth the enemy will try to concentrate his forces and bring them into action against us. I therefore released Prinz Eugen at noon yesterday so that she could conduct commerce warfare on her own. She has managed to evade the enemy. We, on the other hand, because of the hits we have received, have been ordered to proceed to a French port. On our way there the enemy will gather and give us battle. The German people are with you, and we will fight until our gun barrels glow red-hot and the last shell has left the barrels. For us, seamen, the question is victory or death.

Surviving crewmembers of Bismarck state that they received this message in shock. Rather than harden the resolve of the German crew, the tone of Lütjens' speech implied the ship was in some difficulty and that they may not reach a friendly port. It depressed the mood about the battleship and created uncertainty among all ranks. They interpreted Lütjens' words to mean the Admiral did not believe they would survive. Lindemann recognised the damage it caused and tried to present a more optimistic view of the situation. He spoke of the U-boats and Luftwaffe that were gathering to help them home. The speech, an hour later, only partially succeeded in restoring morale. That afternoon Lütjens received messages of best wishes from Hitler and Raeder. The former was short and curt. Lütjens purportedly stuffed the paper into his pocket without comment.

A British reconnaissance aircraft sighted Bismarck in the early morning hours of 26 May by following its oil slick. At dusk on 26 May, Fairey Swordfish torpedo aircraft from HMS Ark Royal attacked. Although much of the damage was superficial, one torpedo jammed Bismarck's rudders and steering gear. Lindemann was sure the damage could be repaired, but Lütjens apparently was quick to accept the worst. As Lindemann and his engineering officers discussed ways to repair the damage Lütjens compiled a note to the German command and people just 30 minutes after the torpedo struck and before the full extent of the damage was known. Divers were put over the side, but reported they could not clear the damage, as the sea was then too rough. The officers also considered using the aircraft hangar doors on board the ship as makeshift rudders but the proposals came to nothing. The crew was still able to steer Bismarck somewhat by adjusting the revolution speed of her propellers, but it reduced the ship's top speed to 7 kn (13 km/h; 8.1 mph) and effectively left it circling in the water.

Throughout the night, she was the target of incessant torpedo attacks by HMS Cossack, Sikh, Maori, Zulu, and ORP Piorun designed to wear down the crew. At this point, the Home Fleet and Norfolk following from the north were joined by HMS Rodney, while Force H and heavy cruiser HMS Dorsetshire approached from the south, and light cruiser HMS Edinburgh from the west. Bismarck's low speed and southeasterly heading away from its known pursuers made it very easy for the force to the south to catch up.

== Death ==
Lütjens recognised the gravity of the situation. At 23:58 on 26 May, Lütjens transmitted to Group West, the Naval HQ "To the Führer of the German Reich, Adolf Hitler. We will fight to the end, believing in you and confident as in a rock in the victory of Germany" Hitler replied at 01:53 on 27 May: "I thank you in the name of the whole German nation – Adolf Hitler." Later another message was sent, "To the crew of the battleship Bismarck: all Germany is with you. What can be done will be done. Your devotion to your duty will strengthen our people in the struggle for their existence – Adolf Hitler."

The mood aboard Bismarck was mixed. Seaman Adolf Eich was off duty for some fresh air. He climbed up to the bridge for as long as nobody stopped him. When he got there he found the atmosphere pleasant. Lindemann was shaking the hand of Adalbert Schneider for his Knight's Cross award bestowed upon him for the destruction of Hood. Lütjens also looked pleased. As the morning wore on the atmosphere changed. Müllenheim-Rechberg saw Lindemann wearing a life jacket and watched as the captain ate his breakfast in silence. He did not return Müllenheim-Rechberg's salute. Müllenheim-Rechberg also met Lütjens as the Admiral made his way to the bridge. Lütjens returned his salute as he brushed past but said nothing. To Müllenheim-Rechberg it seemed as if the two men most responsible for Bismarck had retreated into their own private worlds. That morning, on the 27 May 1941, Lütjens sent a request for a U-boat to pick up the ship's war diary. In this last transmission, Lütjens included: "Ship no longer manoeuvrable. We fight to the last shell. Long live the Führer". Lütjens did not try to mislead his crew about their fate. He ordered the ship’s stores to be opened and allowed the crew to help themselves. It was a sign to all onboard that Bismarck was doomed.

Lütjens had been open to criticism for his sycophantic messages to Hitler and his vow to fight to the last against hopeless odds. The authors of the German official history have commented it would be unjust to criticise him for being sympathetic to the National Socialist cause or to mark him as an Admiral who saw operations through to the end regardless of the outcome. Lütjens had remained notably aloof from the regime. This aside, he was also steeped in the German officer traditions in which it was inconceivable to abandon a fully battle-ready ship. After the scuttling of the Graf Spee, Raeder had ordered all capital ships to fight to the last round if crippled. His messages, according to these historians, should be seen in the context of Lütjens fulfilling his duty. It is unknown whether he or Lindemann considered scuttling the ship to save the crew before the last battle.

Bismarck's alarm sounded for the last time at 08:00 on the morning of 27 May 1941. Norfolk sighted the Bismarck at 08:15, and the battleship Rodney opened fire at 08:48. Bismarck began her last stand and returned fire at 08:49 against Rodney. King George V fired at Bismarck soon after and the cruisers Norfolk and Dorsetshire engaged with their main armament. Bismarck's forward command position was hit at 08:53, and both forward gun turrets were put out of action at 09:02, killing Adalbert Schneider in the main gun director. The after command position was destroyed at 09:18 and turret Dora was disabled at 09:24. Bismarck received further heavy hits at 09:40, resulting in a fire amidships, and turret Caesar went out of action after a hit at 09:50. Some secondary positions and weapons survived and battled on. All weapons fell silent at 10:00. Short of fuel, Rodney and King George V had to disengage prior to Bismarck's sinking.

The Germans were preparing to scuttle Bismarck when three torpedoes fired by Dorsetshire hit the ship's side armour. Bismarck sank at 10:36 at position 48°10′N 16°12′W, roughly 300 nmi (560 km; 350 mi) west of Ouessant (Ushant). The cruiser Dorsetshire saved 86 men (although one died the following day), and the British destroyer Maori saved another 25. Five sailors were saved by German submarine U-74, under the command of Captain Lieutenant Eitel-Friedrich Kentrat, and the weather observation ship Sachsenwald. The Befehlshaber der U-Boote (U-boat Commander-in-Chief) Dönitz had ordered U-556, under the command of Captain Lieutenant Herbert Wohlfarth, to pick up Bismarck's war diary. Out of torpedoes and low on fuel, Wohlfarth requested that the mission be transferred to U-74. U-74 failed to reach Bismarck in time, and the war diary was never retrieved. Lütjens was among those who lost their lives – probably killed when a 16 in (410 mm) salvo fired by Rodney destroyed the bridge, killing many senior officers.

== Personal life ==
Lütjens married Margarete Backenköhler, daughter of the Geheimen Sanitätsrat ("Privy Counselor on Medical Services", honorary title given to a distinguished doctor) Dr. Gerhard Backenköhler, in the summer of 1929. She was 27 at the time of the wedding, the sister of Otto Backenköhler, and a mischling according to the Nuremberg Laws. Admiral Otto Backenköhler was Lütjens' chief of staff at the Fleet-Command (24 October 1939 – 31 July 1940). A year later, on 31 August 1930, their first son, Gerhard, was born in Swinemünde and their second son, born in Berlin on 28 August 1931, was named Günther after his father. Shortly before the outbreak of World War II, their daughter Annemarie was born on 27 August 1939, and less than a month after Lütjens' death, his wife gave birth to their fourth child, Peter.

== In popular culture ==
In the 1960 film, Sink the Bismarck!, Lütjens (played by Karel Štěpánek) is portrayed as a stereotypical Nazi, committed to Nazism and crazed in his undaunted belief that the Bismarck is unsinkable. In reality, Lütjens did not agree with Nazi policies; along with two other navy commanders, he had publicly protested against the brutality of anti-Semitic crimes during Kristallnacht. He was one of the few officers who refused to give the Nazi salute when Hitler visited Bismarck before her first and final mission, deliberately using instead the traditional naval salute. He was pessimistic of the chances of success of Bismarck's mission and realised that it would be a daunting task.

== Commemoration ==
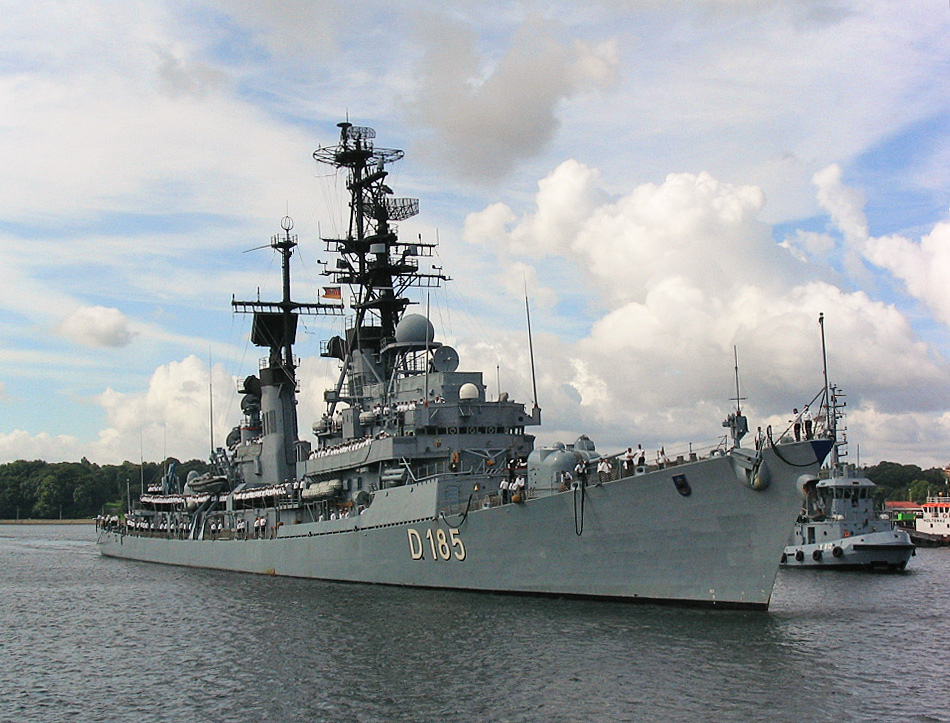
Lütjens (D185).

The Bundesmarine (navy of the Federal Republic of Germany) named the guided missile destroyer Lütjens after Günther Lütjens. The ship was christened by Gerda Lütjens, wife of Lütjens' oldest son Gerhard, in Bath, Maine on 11 August 1967, and was decommissioned in 2003. In his christening speech the then secretary of state at the Ministry of Defence, Karl Carstens, stated that Lütjens had set an example of "unwavering sense of responsibility and devout faithfulness to duty".

Choosing the name "Lütjens" for the newly commissioned destroyer was not without controversy, but the Minister of Defence Gerhard Schröder wanted to break the taboo surrounding the heroes of World War II who were not Nazis but who were not associated with the 20 July plot, the failed assassination of Adolf Hitler. The former Inspector of the Navy Ruge had feared that Lütjens was not known well enough and had suggested the names Adenauer, Berlin and Rommel instead. Schröder however wanted to bridge the gap to former traditions and wanted to name the destroyers after former heroes of the three branches of the Wehrmacht (Heer, Kriegsmarine and Luftwaffe). Lütjens' name had previously been cleared by the German Armed Forces Military History Research Office (Militärgeschichtliches Forschungsamt or MGFA), formerly in Freiburg im Breisgau. Schröder concluded with the words "We must have the courage like any other people, to honour men who have served their country bravely and faithfully."

Following the christening an American worker at the Bath Iron Works approached and asked the attending German journalists "do you only have Nazi heroes back home in Germany?" US newspapers had introduced the namesake as a former Nazi sea hero. Present at the christening was a Bundeswehr helicopter which had been used to shuttle the official German government visitors around, and it bore the insignia of the Bundeswehr, a variant of the Iron Cross. When US radio reporters caught sight of the helicopter they mistakenly referred to the Iron Cross insignia as a swastika in their reports, thus further adding to the controversy.

Lütjens was the first of three Lütjens-class destroyers. The other two were Mölders, named after the Luftwaffe World War II fighter pilot Werner Mölders, and Rommel, named after the Field Marshal Erwin Rommel.

== Summary of career ==
=== Awards ===
- Iron Cross (1914)
  - 2nd Class (6 October 1915)
  - 1st Class (17 August 1916)
- Knight's Cross of the House Order of Hohenzollern with Swords (24 November 1917)
- Friedrich August Cross, 2nd and 1st Class (Oldenburg)
- Knight's Cross 2nd Class of the Order of the Zähringer Lion
- Hanseatic Cross Hamburg (18 June 1917)
- Honour Cross of the World War 1914/1918 (12 September 1934)
- Wehrmacht Long Service Award 1st to 4th Class (2 October 1936)
- Commander's Cross with Star of the Order of Merit of the Hungarian Republic (20 August 1938)
- German Red Cross Decoration 1st Class (17 September 1938)
- Memel Medal (26 October 1939)
- Sudetenland Medal (20 December 1939)
- Clasp to the Iron Cross
  - 2nd Class (4 September 1939)
  - 1st Class (25 October 1939)
- Wound Badge (1939) in Black (20 February 1940)
- Knight's Cross of the Iron Cross on 14 June 1940 as Vizeadmiral and Befehlshaber der Aufklärenden Streitkräfte (Commander-in-Chief of the reconnaissance forces)
- Destroyer War Badge (11 November 1940)
- High Seas Fleet Badge (9 May 1942)

=== Promotions ===
Documents

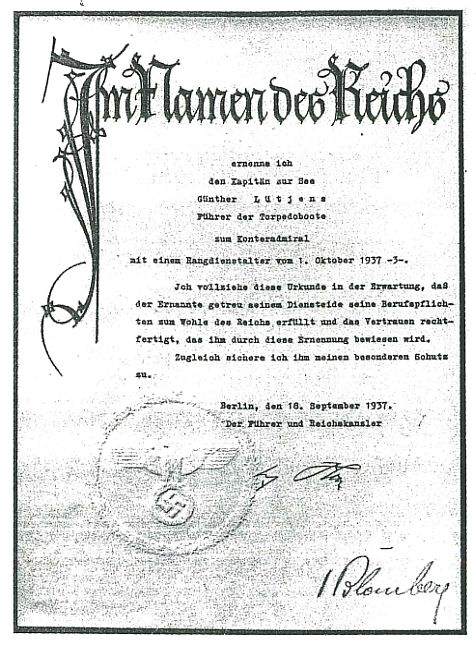
Promotion to Konteradmiral

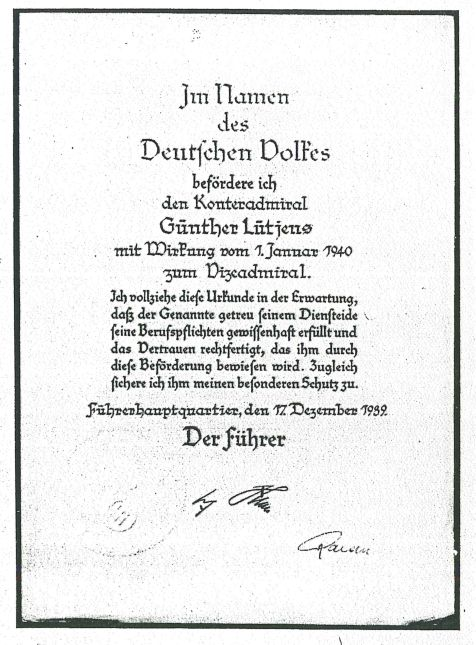
Promotion to Vizeadmiral

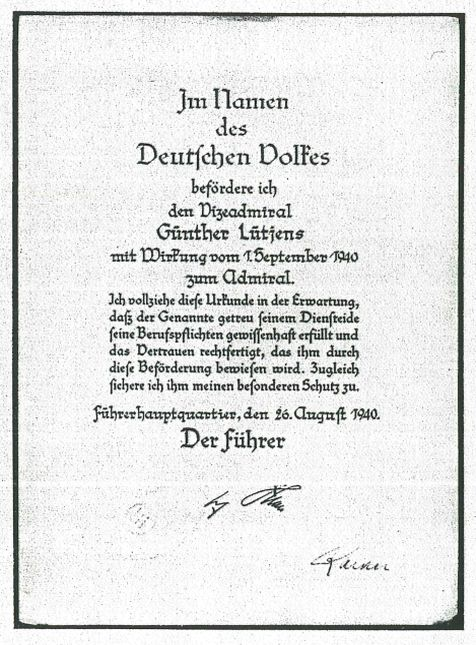
Promotion to Admiral

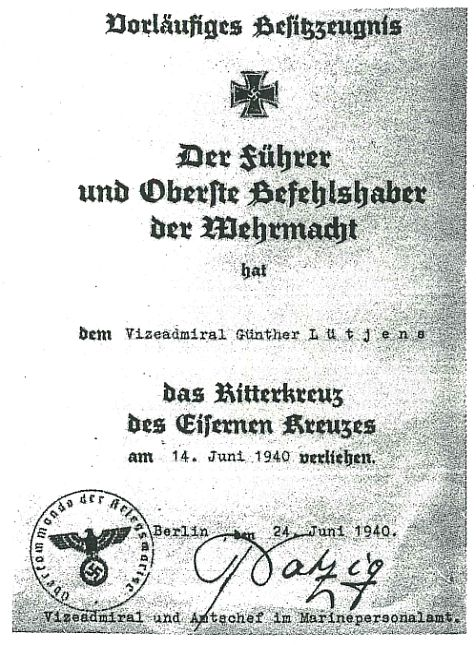
Temporary certificate for the Knight's Cross of the Iron Cross

3 April 1907:	Seekadett (Midshipman)
21 April 1908:	Fähnrich zur See (Officer Cadet)
28 September 1910:	Leutnant zur See (Second Lieutenant)
27 September 1913:	Oberleutnant zur See (First Lieutenant)
24 May 1917:	Kapitänleutnant (Captain Lieutenant)
1 April 1926:	Korvettenkapitän (Corvette Captain)
1 October 1931:	Fregattenkapitän (Frigate Captain)
1 July 1933:	Kapitän zur See (Captain at Sea)
18 September 1937:	Konteradmiral (Counter Admiral), effective as of 1 October 1937
17 December 1939:	Vizeadmiral (Vice Admiral), effective as of 1 January 1940
26 August 1940:	Admiral (Admiral), effective as of 1 September 1940

== Notes ==
Military offices
Preceded by Korvettenkapitän Ernst Wolf	I. Torpedobootsflottille 1920–1933; 3 October 1929 – 16 September 1931	Succeeded by Korvettenkapitän Kurt Fricke
Preceded by Kapitän zur See Oskar Kummetz	Führer der Torpedoboote (F.d.T.) 1933–1939; 8 October 1937 – 20 October 1939	Succeeded by Kapitän zur See Wilhelm Meisel
Preceded by Konteradmiral Hermann Densch	Befehlshaber der Aufklärungsstreitkräfte (B.d.A.); 21 October 1939 – 1 April 1940	Succeeded by Vizeadmiral Hubert Schmundt
Preceded by Admiral Wilhelm Marschall	Fleet Commander of the Kriegsmarine; 11 March – 23 April 1940 (acting); 18 June – 7 July 1940 (acting); July 1940 – 27 May 1941	Succeeded by Generaladmiral Otto Schniewind
