= Convoy HX 106 =

Convoy during naval battles of the Second World War

Convoy HX.106
- Part of World War II
Date	30 January 1941-18 February 1941
Location	North Atlantic

Belligerents
Germany	United Kingdom Canada

Commanders and leaders
Germany Admiral Karl Dönitz; GermanyAdmiral Günther Lütjens	(United Kingdom) Captain W. H. Poole Rd RNR

Strength
	41 merchant ships 11 escorts (1 when attacked)

Casualties and losses
	2 merchants sunk

Convoy HX 106 was the 106th of the numbered series of Allied HX convoys of merchant ships from Halifax, Nova Scotia to Liverpool, England. Forty-one ships departed Halifax, Nova Scotia on 30 January 1941, eastbound to Liverpool, England. The use of convoys was a standard tactic throughout the Battle of the Atlantic as a defence against U-boats and German commerce raiders.

On 8 February 1941 the two German battleships, Scharnhorst and Gneisenau, found the convoy. The German squadron was under the command of Admiral Günther Lütjens. The captain of Scharnhorst offered to draw off the escorting Royal Navy battleship HMS Ramillies, so that Gneisenau could sink the merchant ships. This strategy, if successful, would have entailed little risk to Scharnhorst as she was 11 knots (20 km/h) faster than Ramillies, and her newer 280 mm (11 in) guns outranged the 1915 era 15-inch (381 mm) guns of the British ship. However, Lutjens strictly followed Hitler's directive not to engage enemy capital ships, and withdrew.

Later, two of the convoy's merchant ships were sunk by the submarine U-96, including Arthur F. Corwin loaded with 14,500 tons of aviation fuel. She went down on 13 February, taking all 59 crew with her.

== Ships in the convoy ==
=== Allied merchant ships ===
A total of 41 merchant vessels joined the convoy, either in Halifax or later in the voyage.

Name	Flag	Tonnage (GRT)	Notes
Abercos (1920)	United Kingdom	6,076	Straggled
Arthur F Corwin (1938)	United Kingdom	10,516	Joined ex-BHX 106, Straggled 10 Feb 41; Sunk by U-96
Athelbeach (1931)	United Kingdom	6,568	Joined ex-BHX 106
Botavon (1912)	United Kingdom	5,848	Straggled 10 Feb 41; Vice-Commodore
British Fortune (1930)	United Kingdom	4,696	Joined ex-BHX 106
Capsa (1931)	United Kingdom	8,229	Joined ex-BHX 106
Cardium (1931)	United Kingdom	8,236	Joined ex-BHX 106
Chama (1938)	United Kingdom	8,077	Joined ex-BHX 106
Charlton Hall (1940)	United Kingdom	5,200	Straggled 10 Feb 41
Clea (1938)	United Kingdom	8,028	Joined ex-BHX 106, Straggled 10 Feb 41; Sunk by U-96
Cliona (1931)	United Kingdom	8,375	
Contractor (1930)	United Kingdom	6,004	Joined ex-BHX 106
Dover Hill (1918)	United Kingdom	5,815	Joined ex-BHX 106
Edward F Johnson (1937)	United Kingdom	10,452	Joined ex-BHX 106
Esturia (1914)	United Kingdom	6,968	Joined ex-BHX 106, Straggled 10 Feb 41
Evanger (1920)	Norway	3,869	
Ganges (1930)	United Kingdom	6,246	Joined ex-BHX 106
Garonne (1921)	Norway	7,113	Joined ex-BHX 106
Geo W McKnight (1933)	United Kingdom	12,502	Joined ex-BHX 106
Harpagus (1940)	United Kingdom	5,173	
Hopemount (1929)	United Kingdom	7,434	Straggled 3 Feb 41
Horda (1920)	Norway	4,301	Straggled 10 Feb 41
Kheti (1927)	United Kingdom	2,734	Joined ex-BHX 106
Laguna (1923)	United Kingdom	6,466	Joined ex-BHX 106, Straggled 10 Feb 41
Leiesten (1930)	Norway	6,118	Joined ex-BHX 106. Straggled 10 Feb
Lodestone (1938)	United Kingdom	4,877	Joined ex-BHX 106, Straggled 10 Feb 41
Mactra (1936)	United Kingdom	6,193	Joined ex-BHX 106
Malmanger (1920)	Norway	7,078	Joined ex-BHX 106
Miralda (1936)	United Kingdom	8,013	Joined ex-BHX 106
Mirza (1929)	Netherlands	7,991	Joined ex-BHX 106
Nurtureton (1929)	United Kingdom	6,272	
Oilfield (1938)	United Kingdom	8,516	Joined ex-BHX 106
Opalia (1938)	United Kingdom	6,195	Joined ex-BHX 106
R J Cullen (1919)	United Kingdom	6,993	
San Eliseo (1939)	United Kingdom	8,042	Joined ex-BHX 106
San Fabian (1922)	United Kingdom	13,031	
Silveray (1925)	United Kingdom	4,535	Joined ex-BHX 106
Temple Arch (1940)	United Kingdom	5,138	Joined ex-BHX 106. Straggled 10 Feb
Topdalsfjord (1921)	Norway	4,271	Capt W H Poole Rd RNR (Commodore)
Torborg (1921)	Norway	6,042	Joined ex-BHX 106
Trelissick (1919)	United Kingdom	5,265	Joined ex-BHX 106

=== Convoy escorts ===
A series of armed military ships escorted the convoy at various times during its journey.

Name	Flag	Type	Joined	Left
HMS Burnham	Royal Navy	Town-class destroyer	12 Feb 1941	15 Feb 1941
HMCS Collingwood	Royal Canadian Navy	Flower-class corvette	30 Jan 1941	31 Jan 1941
HMS Kingcup	Royal Navy	Flower-class corvette	15 Feb 1941	17 Feb 1941
HMS La Malouine	Royal Navy	Flower-class corvette	12 Feb 1941	17 Feb 1941
HMS Malcolm	Royal Navy	Admiralty-type destroyer leader	12 Feb 1941	15 Feb 1941
HMS/HMT Northern Pride	Royal Navy	ASW (anti-submarine warfare) trawler	15 Feb 1941	18 Feb 1941
HMS Ramillies	Royal Navy	Revenge-class battleship	30 Jan 1941	10 Feb 1941
HMS Saladin	Royal Navy	Admiralty S-class destroyer	12 Feb 1941	14 Feb 1941
HMS Sardonyx	Royal Navy	Admiralty S-class destroyer	12 Feb 1941	17 Feb 1941
HMS Skate	Royal Navy	R-class destroyer	12 Feb 1941	18 Feb 1941
HMT Vizalma	Royal Navy	ASW trawler	15 Feb 1941	18 Feb 1941
