= Harald Netzbandt =

- Born: 3 August 1892
- Died: 27 May 1941 (aged 48); Atlantic Ocean
- Military career
- Allegiance: German Empire; Weimar Republic; Nazi Germany
- Branch: Kaiserliche Marine; Reichsmarine; Kriegsmarine
- Rank: Kapitän zur See
- Commands: Battleship Gneisenau
- Conflicts: World War II: Last battle of the battleship Bismarck †

Harald Netzbandt (3 August 1892 in Berlin – 27 May 1941 in the North Atlantic) was an officer of the Imperial German Navy, the Reichsmarine and later the Kriegsmarine.

Promoted to Kapitän zur See from 1 October 1937 he was in command of the fleet flagship, the battleship Gneisenau, from 26 November 1939 to 1 August 1940. Subsequently, he was appointed chief of staff in the fleet command and was killed on 27 May 1941, aboard the new battleship Bismarck alongside Fleet Admiral Günther Lütjens and other staff officers.

== Awards ==
- German Cross in Gold on 30 April 1942 as Kapitän zur See with the OKM/Flottenkommando

== Bibliography ==
- Patzwall, Klaus D.; Scherzer, Veit (2001). Das Deutsche Kreuz 1941 – 1945 Geschichte und Inhaber Band II [The German Cross 1941 – 1945 History and Recipients Volume 2] (in German). Norderstedt, Germany: Verlag Klaus D. Patzwall. ISBN 978-3-931533-45-8.
