= Action off Lofoten =

Naval battle fought during the Second World War

- Part of the Norwegian campaign of the Second World War
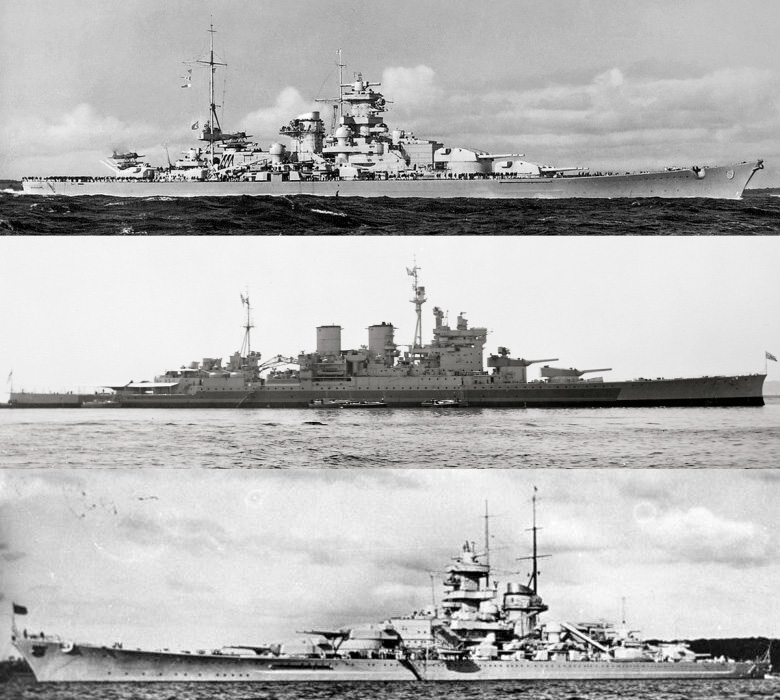
- The capital ships that fought during the action off Lofoten: Scharnhorst (top), HMS Renown (middle), and Gneisenau (bottom).
Date	9 April 1940
Location	off Lofoten, Norway
Result	See Aftermath

Belligerents
(Nazi Germany) Kriegsmarine	(United Kingdom) Royal Navy

Commanders and leaders
(Nazi Germany) Günther Lütjens	(United Kingdom) Sir William Whitworth

Strength
Battleship Gneisenau; Battleship Scharnhorst	Battlecruiser Renown; 9 destroyers

Casualties and losses
Gneisenau damaged; Scharnhorst damaged; 6 killed	Renown slightly damaged; 2 killed

The action off Lofoten was a naval battle fought between the German Kriegsmarine and the British Royal Navy off the southern coast of the Lofoten Islands, Norway during the Second World War. A German squadron under Vizeadmiral Günther Lütjens consisting of the battleships Scharnhorst and Gneisenau met and engaged a British squadron under Admiral Sir William Whitworth consisting of the battlecruiser HMS Renown and nine destroyers. After a short engagement, Gneisenau suffered moderate damage and the Germans withdrew.

== Background ==
=== Kriegsmarine ===
Operation Weserübung, the German invasion of Norway, began on 9 April 1940. To prevent any disruption of the invasion by the British, the Kriegsmarine had dispatched a force under Vice Admiral Günther Lütjens to protect the troop convoy landing at Narvik. The German squadron consisted of the battleships Scharnhorst and Gneisenau, the heavy cruiser Admiral Hipper and ten destroyers. With intelligence suggesting that the Germans were massing ships, the British sent out a squadron under Admiral Sir William Whitworth to deny German access to neutral Norwegian waters by laying mines in Operation Wilfred and prevent any German naval movements into the Atlantic Ocean.

The German force consisted of the two Scharnhorst-class battleships, each with a main battery of nine 28.3 cm guns and a secondary battery of twelve 15 cm guns. In a close range engagement, the British force was superior but at a distance the British destroyers were outranged and the German firepower was greater. The German force also held a speed advantage over Renown, having a top speed of 32 knots (59 km/h; 37 mph) to the 30 knots (56 km/h; 35 mph) of Renown but was slower than the destroyers, which could steam at 36 knots (67 km/h; 41 mph). Lütjens held an advantage over Renown, though the German force was significantly vulnerable to attack from the destroyers.

=== Royal Navy ===
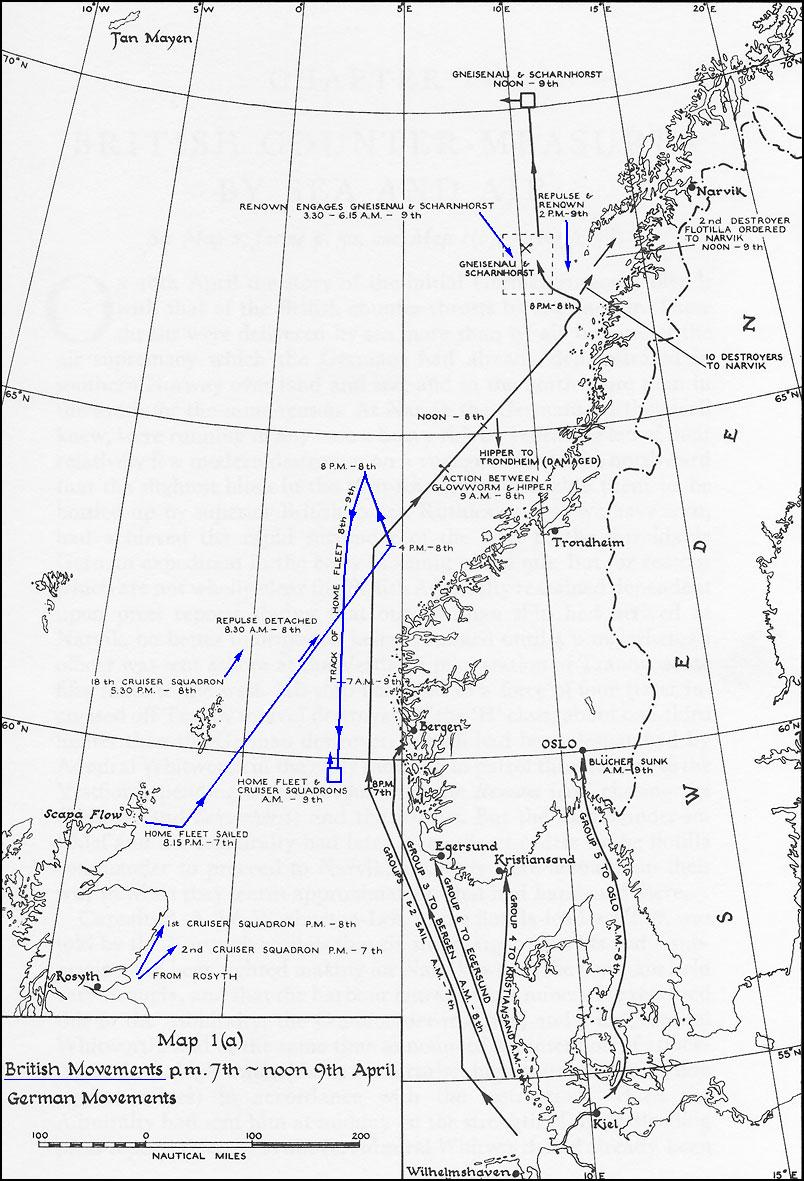
British and German naval movements off Norway between 7 and 9 April 1940.

Whitworth's force consisted of the battlecruiser Renown and the nine remaining destroyers. HMS Hotspur, Hardy, Havock, and Hunter were H-class destroyers, HMS Esk was an E-class destroyer and HMS Ivanhoe, Icarus and Impulsive were of the I class. HMS Greyhound was of the G class. Renown had been reconstructed between 1936 and 1939, with lighter machinery, increased armour and upgraded armament. She mounted a main battery of six 42-calibre 15-inch guns with improved shells and greater range and a dual-purpose secondary battery of twenty 4.5-inch (113 mm) guns arranged in ten turrets. The four I and E-class destroyers had been rigged for mine laying and most of their normal armament had been removed; they only had two 4.7-inch (120 mm) guns each. Greyhound and the H-class destroyers were more capable ships, each armed with eight torpedo tubes and four 4.7-inch guns. Of the H-class destroyers, Hardy was built as a destroyer flotilla leader and had an additional 4.7-inch gun.

== Prelude ==
Shortly after departing German waters on 7 April, Lütjens' force was attacked by British bombers, which did no damage to the squadron. On 8 April, Admiral Hipper and the German destroyers were dispatched to Narvik while the German capital ships headed north for a diversionary manoeuvre into the North Atlantic. As Admiral Hipper left, she met and engaged the British destroyer HMS Glowworm which had become separated from Whitworth's force. Though Lütjens—and the two German battleships—was nearby, their assistance was deemed unnecessary, and Admiral Hipper sank Glowworm, though suffering some damage in return. Whitworth's main force then caught sight of Scharnhorst and Gneisenau at 03:30 on 9 April and moved to engage the battleships.

== Battle ==
At 03:50, Gneisenau sighted Renown on its radar (but failed to identify her) and the German ships cleared for action. Due to poor weather, neither side was able to engage until 04:05, as heavy seas and poor visibility prevented the two squadrons from closing within range. Renown began the action by opening fire on Gneisenau with her 15-inch guns. The German warships replied at 04:11 with Gneisenau obtaining two hits on Renown with her 11-inch shells. Both shells failed to explode, with the first hitting the British battlecruiser's foremast and the second passing through the ship near the steering gear room. About the same time, Renown struck Gneisenau with two shells and a third a little later. The hits damaged Gneisenau on the director tower forward range finders and aft turret putting it out of action, a port anti-aircraft gun was also hit. Renown then transferred fire to Scharnhorst, which had moved to hide Gneisenau with smoke. Both German ships suffered damage from the heavy seas as they sought to avoid Renown's fire and both suffered serious electrical problems in their turrets as a result, resulting in a reduced rate of fire. Renown suffered some damage to her starboard bulge from the rough seas and firing of her guns, limiting speed. The early salvos were sporadic and lasted until 05:00, when the engagement was broken off for 20 minutes due to waves breaking over Renown's forward turrets as the German ships headed directly into the storm to escape. By this time Renown's destroyer escort had fallen back due to the severe weather and Scharnhorst started to suffer radar problems at about 04:20.

At 05:20, the action resumed, with ineffectual fire coming from both sides. With both ships damaged by their speed through the storm, Gneisenau missing a turret and Scharnhorst's radar out of action, as well as fearing a torpedo attack on Gneisenau, the Germans increased their speed and disengaged at 06:15. The Germans mistook Whitworth's smaller vessels for much more powerful capital ships and as a result thought they were substantially outgunned. Damaged and determined to steer clear of what he thought was a superior force, Lütjens managed to shake off the British squadron and end the action by sailing west into the Arctic Ocean. With her damaged bulge and the problems of firing forwards into a storm, Renown was forced to break off the search, instead moving to cut off the ships should they turn round. Renown fired 230 fifteen-inch and one thousand and sixty-five 4.5-inch rounds during the action, while Scharnhorst fired a hundred and eighty-two 11-inch rounds and Gneisenau fifty-four 11-inch rounds.

== Aftermath ==
Despite the Royal Navy winning a minor tactical victory over the Kriegsmarine, the Germans considered the engagement a strategic success due to the fact that Whitworth's force was delayed long enough to keep it from interfering with the landings at Narvik. After the action, Whitworth's force continued to search for the German capital ships. With the British squadron occupied, the German destroyer-transports managed to make their way through to Narvik after destroying two Norwegian coastal defence ships in their path. After their engagement with Renown, the German battleships rendezvoused with Admiral Hipper on 11 April near Trondheim. From there, they returned to Germany, reaching Wilhelmshaven on 12 April where the battle and weather damage to Scharnhorst and Gneisenau was repaired.

== See also ==
- List of Kriegsmarine ships
- List of classes of British ships of World War II
