= USS Winston S. Churchill =

Arleigh Burke-class destroyer

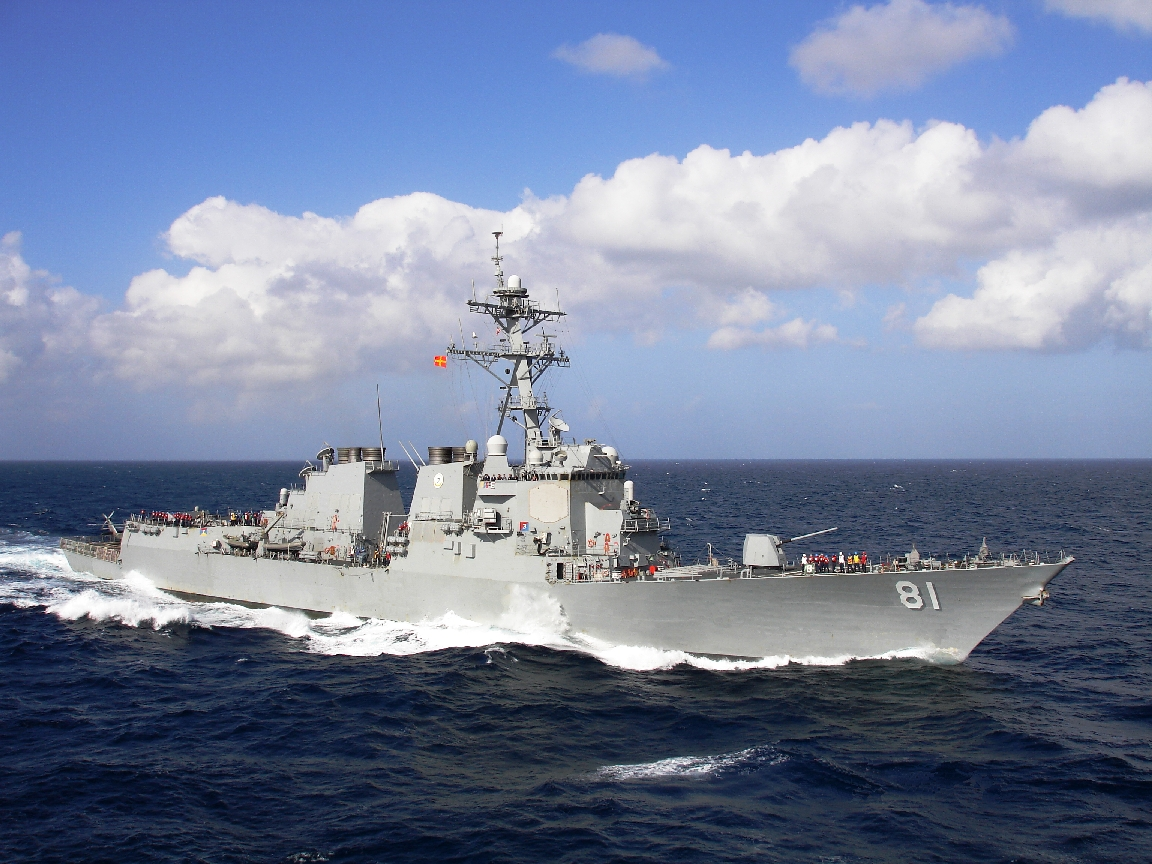
- USS Winston S. Churchill (DDG-81), in 2008

History

United States
- Name: Winston S. Churchill
- Namesake: Winston S. Churchill
- Ordered: 6 January 1995
- Builder: Bath Iron Works
- Laid down: 7 May 1998
- Launched: 17 April 1999
- Commissioned: 10 March 2001
- Home port: Mayport
- Identification: MMSI number: 338821000; Callsign: NWSC; Hull number: DDG-81
- Motto: In war: Resolution; In peace: Good Will
- Status: in active service
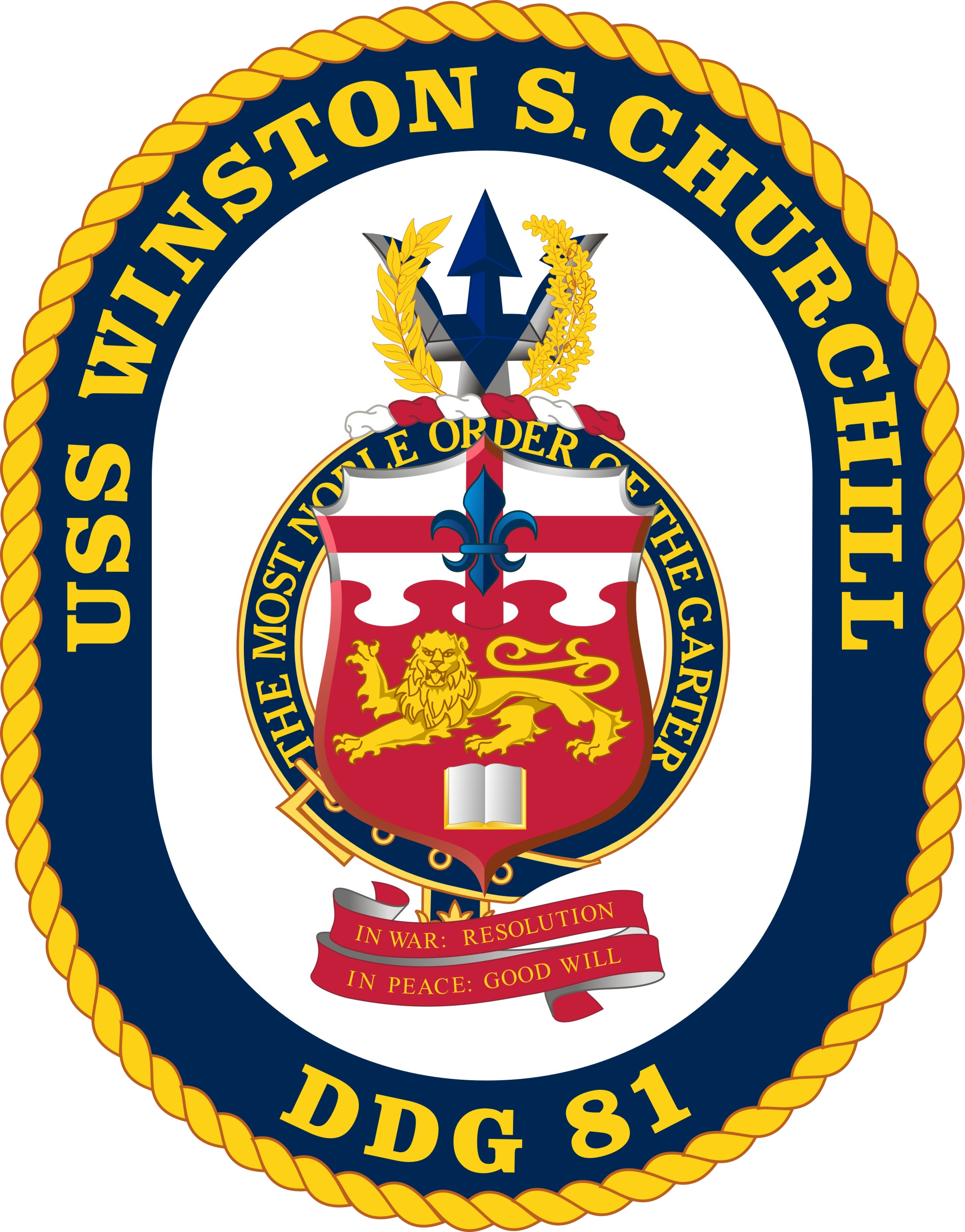
- Badge

General characteristics
- Class & type: Arleigh Burke-class destroyer
- Displacement: 9,496 long tons (9,648 t) (Full load)
- Length: 509.5 ft (155.3 m)
- Beam: 59 ft (18 m)
- Draft: 31 ft (9.4 m)
- Installed power: 4 × General Electric LM2500-30 gas turbines; 100,000 shp (75,000 kW)
- Propulsion: 2 × shafts
- Speed: In excess of 30 kn (56 km/h; 35 mph)
- Complement: 32 officers, 348 enlisted
- Electronic warfare & decoys: AN/SLQ-32(V)3
- Armament: Guns: 1 × 5-inch (127 mm)/62 mk 45 mod 4 (lightweight gun); 2 × 20 mm (0.8 in) Phalanx CIWS; 2 × 25 mm (0.98 in) Mk 38 machine gun system; 4 × 0.50 inches (12.7 mm) caliber guns; Missiles: 1 × 32-cell, 1 × 64-cell (96 total cells) Mk 41 vertical launching system (VLS): RIM-66M surface-to-air missile; RIM-156 surface-to-air missile; RIM-174A standard ERAM; RIM-161 anti-ballistic missile; RIM-162 ESSM (quad-packed); BGM-109 Tomahawk cruise missile; RUM-139 vertical launch ASROC; Torpedoes: 2 × Mark 32 triple torpedo tubes: Mark 46 lightweight torpedo; Mark 50 lightweight torpedo; Mark 54 lightweight torpedo; Drones: 2 × 4-cell (8 total cells) Block 3/Coyote LE SR drone launcher
- Aircraft carried: 2 × MH-60R Seahawk helicopters

USS Winston S. Churchill (DDG-81) is an Arleigh Burke-class (Flight IIA) Aegis guided missile destroyer of the United States Navy. She is named after Sir Winston Churchill, former Prime Minister of the United Kingdom. She is the 18th ship of the class to be built at Bath Iron Works in Bath, Maine. Construction began on 7 May 1998, and the vessel launched and christened on 17 April 1999. On 10 March 2001, she was commissioned during a ceremony at Town Point Park in Norfolk, Virginia.

== Naming ==
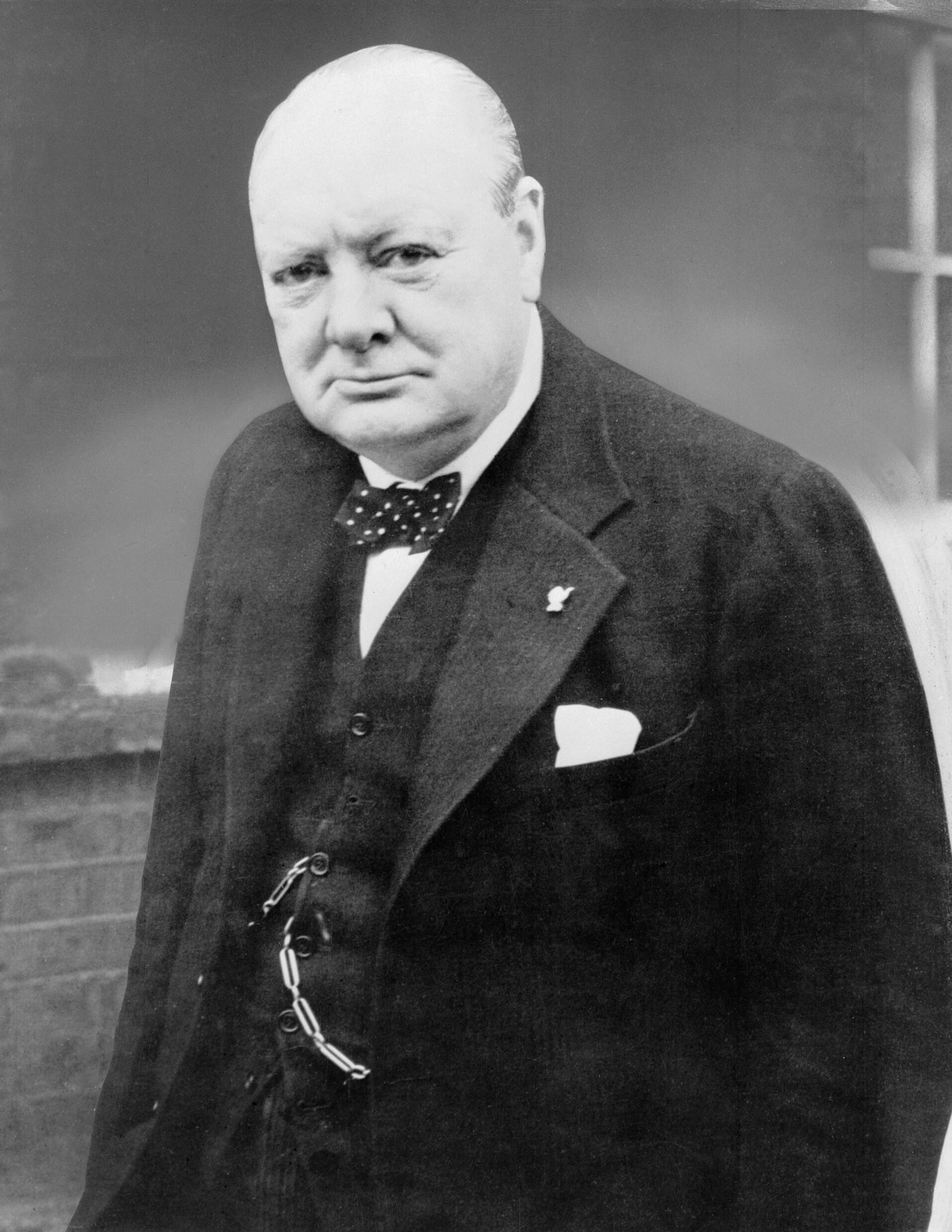
Sir Winston Churchill

On 29 November 1995, on a visit to the United Kingdom, President Bill Clinton announced to the British Parliament that a new warship would be named after Sir Winston Churchill. She was the first destroyer and fourth American warship named after a British citizen, and the first since 1976 named after a non-U.S. citizen (that being USS Comte de Grasse), though Churchill was an honorary U.S. citizen and his mother Lady Randolph Churchill was American-born.

The three other U.S. warships which had been named after Britons included the Continental Navy frigates Alfred (named after Alfred the Great) and Raleigh (named after Sir Walter Raleigh, though three subsequent USS Raleighs—and two Confederate warships—would be named after the North Carolina city, which did not exist at the time), and Effingham, named after Thomas Howard, 3rd Earl of Effingham who resigned his commission rather than fight the Americans during the American Revolutionary War. The former frigate Harold E. Holt was also named after a person from a country in the Commonwealth of Nations, Harold Holt, the Australian Prime Minister, who disappeared, (presumed drowned), while still in office just a year before Harold E. Holt was laid down. Winston S. Churchill is the first ship to be named after a British citizen or British Prime Minister of the modern era.

Winston S. Churchill is the only U.S. Navy vessel to have a Royal Navy exchange officer permanently assigned to the ship's company (usually a Navigation Officer). The U.S. Navy had a permanent U.S. Navy Officer on the Royal Navy ship HMS Marlborough until her decommissioning on 8 July 2005. Winston S. Churchill is also the only U.S. Naval vessel to fly a foreign ensign. Being named after a Briton, the Royal Navy's White Ensign is honorarily flown on special occasions from the ship's mast, on the port side, whereas the U.S. flag is flown from the starboard side. However, during normal operations, only the U.S. flag is flown on the center of the main mast.

== Design ==
The ship is the first of the Flight IIA variants fitted with the 62-caliber Mark 45 Mod 4 naval gun system. The guns' longer barrels allow more complete combustion of the propellant, reducing barrel flare and improving projectile velocity and firepower against ship and shore targets; additionally, the Mk 45 mod 4 uses a modified gun-house, designed to reduce its radar signature. Winston S. Churchill is armed with Tomahawk, Standard and ASROC (VLA) missiles.

The vessel additionally contains two hangars, not present in earlier destroyers; these can house Light Airborne Multi-Purpose System (LAMPS) Sikorsky SH-60B or MH-60R Seahawk helicopters. These LAMPS can be fitted with air-to-surface missiles for surface ship attacks, and torpedoes for submarine attacks.

The ship is also fitted with the AN/SPY-1D phased array radar—this represents a significant advancement in the detection capabilities of the Aegis weapon system and provides enhanced resistance to electronic countermeasures. The radar can guide more than one hundred missiles at once to targets as far as 600 nautical miles (1,100 km; 690 mi).

== Service history ==
The contract to build Winston S. Churchill was awarded to the Bath Iron Works Corporation on 6 January 1995, and the keel was laid down on 7 May 1998. Winston S. Churchill was launched on 17 April 1999, delivered 13 October 2000, and commissioned 10 March 2001. The launch and christening of the ship was co-sponsored by Lady Soames, the daughter of Winston Churchill, and Mrs. Janet Cohen, wife of the Secretary of Defense. Her first commanding officer was Commander (and future Vice Admiral) Michael T. Franken.

During May–June 2001, Winston S. Churchill underwent shock trials 100 nautical miles off the coast of Naval Station Mayport, Florida. These trials subjected the ship to various close-range underwater detonations, and were performed to collect data concerning ship survivability and damage resistance in a modern threat environment. Winston S. Churchill sustained minor damage during these three tests. The tests cost 20 million dollars.

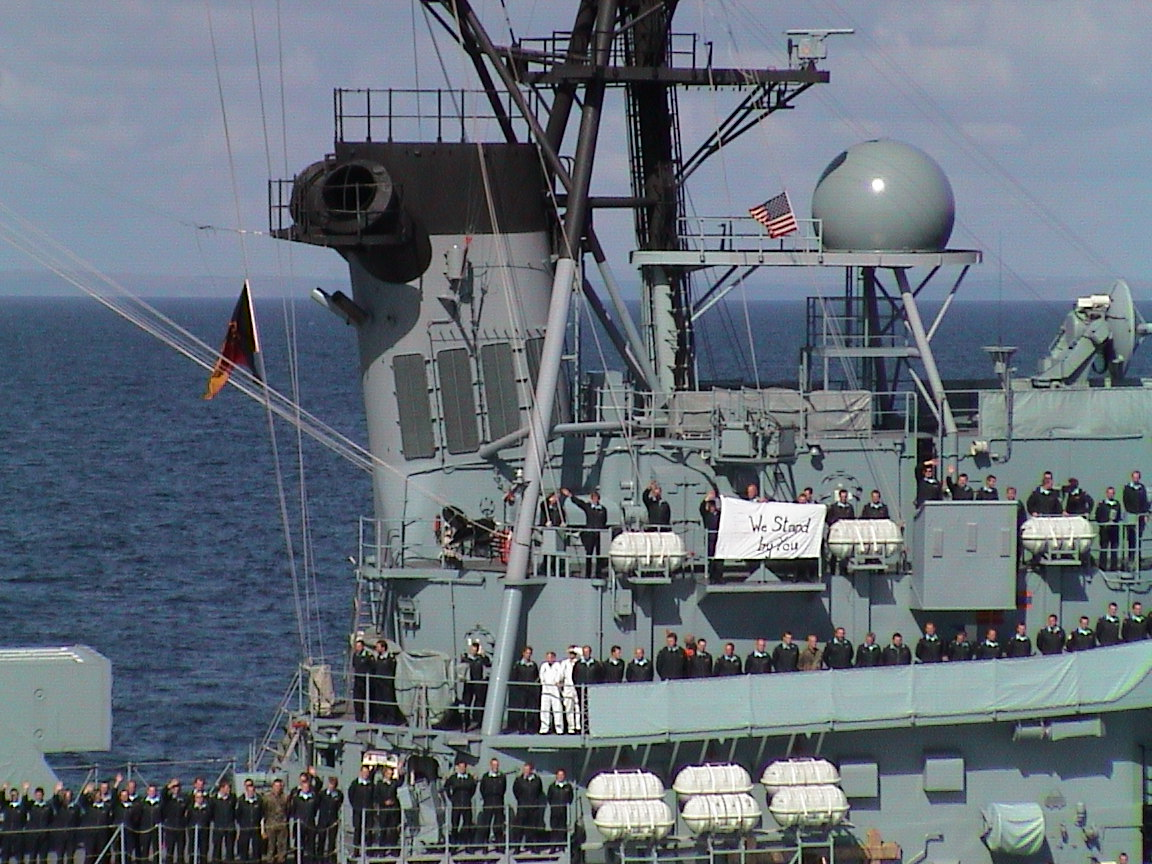
Crew of German destroyer Lütjens pay homage as they bid farewell to the crew Winston S. Churchill

On 14 September 2001 (three days after the 11 September 2001 attacks), the German Navy destroyer Lütjens passed close abeam Winston S. Churchill and rendered honors by manning the rails, flying the Stars and Stripes at half-mast, and the display of a banner reading "We Stand By You". An e-mail sent by an ensign on board Winston S. Churchill described the occasion.

In January 2003, Winston S. Churchill deployed with the USS Theodore Roosevelt battle group in support of the Iraq War's Operation Iraqi Freedom, firing several Tomahawk missiles. Winston S. Churchill returned to Norfolk at the end of May 2003.

On 22 August 2005, Winston S. Churchill was involved in a minor collision with the destroyer USS McFaul off the coast of Jacksonville, Florida. Both ships suffered minor damage, and no injuries were reported. Both ships returned to their homeport at Naval Station Norfolk under their own power.

On 22 January 2006 Winston S. Churchill captured a suspected pirate vessel in the Indian Ocean as part of an ongoing effort to help maintain law and order in the region.

On 26 September 2010, Winston S. Churchill came across a disabled skiff in the Gulf of Aden. After attempts to repair the skiff's engines failed Winston S. Churchill took the vessel under tow towards Somalia. On 27 September the skiff sank when the 85 passengers rushed to one side of the skiff during a food delivery, causing the vessel to capsize. Winston S. Churchill was able to rescue 61 of the passengers and continued towards Somalia on 28 September.

Her homeport was formerly Naval Station Norfolk, and became Naval Station Mayport, Florida on 19 July 2021. She is currently a part of Carrier Strike Group 12.

On 11–12 February 2021, Winston S. Churchill seized thousands of weapons from two stateless dhows off the coast of Somalia.

On 18 February 2026, it was reported to be joining the United States military buildup in the Middle East during the United States–Iran crisis as part of the USS Gerald R. Ford carrier strike group.

== Awards ==
- Presidential Unit Citation - 2026), as part of USS Gerald R. Ford Carrier Strike Group, Carrier Strike Group Twelve.
- Arizona Memorial Trophy – (2019–2020)

== Coat of arms ==
=== Shield ===
The shield features an inescutcheon of Churchill's ancestral coat of arms and the cross of St. George. The traditional Navy colors were chosen for the shield because dark blue and gold represents the sea and excellence respectively. Red signifies sacrifice and valor. The cross of St. George and the fleur-de-lis are from Churchill's augmentation from his ancestor's coat of arms. The red cross on the white field is a reference to the flag of St. George. The gold lion over the field of red is a reference to the heritage of Great Britain. The lion shows strength, courage and determination. The nebuly is representative of the sky and clouds, which recall Britain enduring German airpower in the Battle of Britain. Winston Churchill's reputation as an inspiring war leader, talented statesman, orator and author is referred to by the stylized book.

=== Crest ===
The crest consists of a trident encompassed by a chevron, laurel and oak. The trident is a symbol for sea prowess and represents the ship's vertical launch capabilities. The tridents tines denote air, surface, and anti-submarine warfare capabilities. A chevron divides the trident which suggests a "V" to signify victory in way and strength of defense in peace. The laurel symbolizes honor and achievement while the oak represents strength and resolve.

=== Motto ===
The motto is written on a double scroll of red that has a white reverse side. The ship's motto, "In war: Resolution. In peace: Good Will", is taken from the epigraph of Churchill's The Second World War.

=== Seal ===
The coat of arms in full color as in the blazon, upon a white background enclosed within a dark blue oval border edged on the outside with a gold rope and bearing the inscription "USS Winston S. Churchill" at the top and "DDG 81" in the base, all gold.
