= German destroyer Rommel =

Guided-missile destroyer (1970–1998)

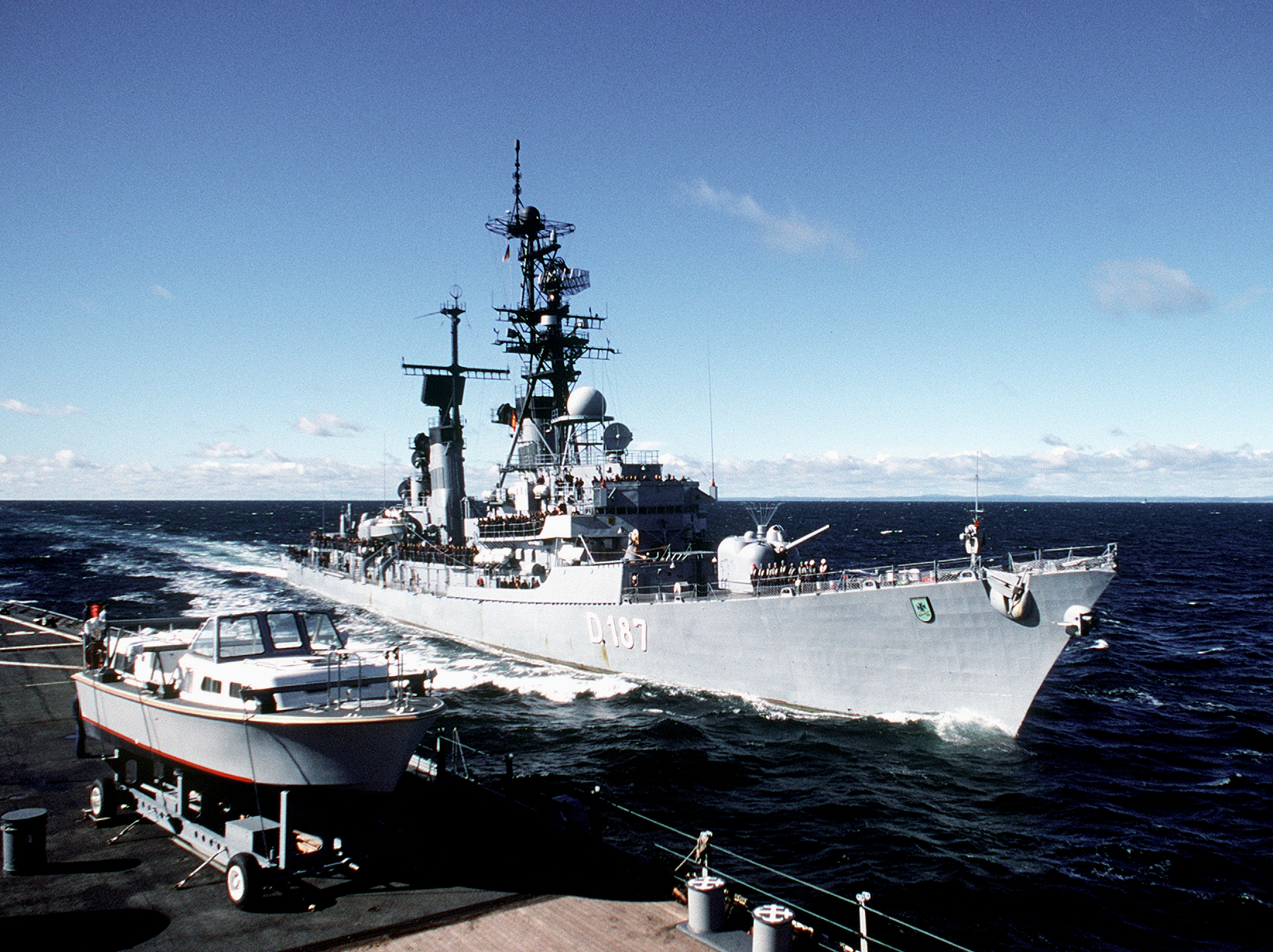
- Rommel on exercise in the Atlantic in 1986

History

Germany
- Name: Rommel
- Namesake: Erwin Rommel
- Builder: Bath Iron Works, Bath, Maine
- Laid down: 22 August 1967
- Launched: 1 February 1969
- Commissioned: 2 May 1970
- Decommissioned: 30 September 1998
- Stricken: 30 June 1999
- Home port: Kiel
- Fate: Scrapped, 2004

General characteristics
- Class & type: Lütjens-class destroyer
- Displacement: 4,460 t (4,390 long tons)
- Length: 134 m (440 ft)
- Beam: 14 m (46 ft)
- Draft: 6.4 m (21 ft)
- Propulsion: 4 × high pressure superheated steam boilers; 2 × turbines; 70,000 PS (51,000 kW)
- Speed: 33 knots (61 km/h; 38 mph)
- Complement: 337 officers and men
- Armament: 2 × 127 mm/54 Mk 42 mod 10 guns; 2 × Rheinmetall Mk 20 RH-202 20 mm autocannons; 1 × Mk 13 launcher, 40 Tartar surface-to-air missiles; 6 × Mk 32 324 mm (13 in) torpedo tubes, torpedoes; 1 × ASROC launcher, 8 cell

The German destroyer D187 Rommel was one of three Lütjens-class guided-missile destroyers, a modified version of the American Charles F. Adams class, built for the Bundesmarine (West German Navy) during the 1960s.

== Design and description ==
The Charles F. Adams class was based on a stretched Forrest Sherman-class destroyer hull modified to accommodate smaller RIM-24 Tartar surface-to-air missiles and all their associated equipment. The ships had an overall length of 134.4 meters (440 ft 11 in), a beam of 14.4 meters (47 ft 3 in) and a deep draft of 4.5 meters (14 ft 9 in). They displaced 4,526 metric tons (4,455 long tons) at full load. Their crew consisted of 333 officers and enlisted men.

The ships were equipped with two geared General Electric steam turbines, each driving one propeller shaft, using steam provided by four D-V2M water-tube boilers. The turbines were intended to produce 70,000 shaft horsepower (52,000 kW) to reach the designed speed of 36 knots (67 km/h; 41 mph). The Lütjens class had a range of 4,500 nautical miles (8,300 km; 5,200 mi) at a speed of 20 knots (37 km/h; 23 mph). Unlike their half-sisters, the ships had two macks.

They were armed with two 5"/54 caliber Mark 42 gun forward, one each forward and aft of the superstructure. The ships were fitted with an eight-round ASROC launcher between the funnels. Close-range anti-submarine defense was provided by two triple sets of 324-millimetre (12.75 in) Mk 32 torpedo tubes. The primary armament of the ships was the Tartar surface-to-air missile designed to defend the carrier battle group. They were fired via the single-arm Mk 13 missile launcher and the ships stowed a total of 40 missiles for the launcher.

== Construction and career ==
Rommel was laid down on 22 August 1967 by Bath Iron Works of Bath, Maine with the hull number DDG-30. She was launched on 1 February 1969, and christened Rommel by Lucie Maria Rommel, widow of Generalfeldmarschall Erwin Rommel. The vessel was commissioned on 2 May 1970, and was added to the 1. Zerstörergeschwader (first destroyer squadron), based in Kiel. She operated for 28 years.

On 30 September 1998, Rommel was decommissioned. The operating licence for the boilers had expired and it was not considered efficient to refit her. She was towed to Wilhelmshaven to be cannibalised for spare parts to support her two sister ships, Lütjens and Mölders. These two vessels continued to serve for five more years. In 2004 the hull of Rommel was scrapped in Turkey.

== Bibliography ==
- Friedman, Norman (1982). U.S. Destroyers: An Illustrated Design History. Annapolis, Maryland: Naval Institute Press. ISBN 0-87021-733-X.
- Gardiner, Robert; Chumbley, Stephen & Budzbon, Przemysław (1995). Conway's All the World's Fighting Ships 1947-1995. Annapolis, Maryland: Naval Institute Press. ISBN 1-55750-132-7.
