= German destroyer Mölders =

German naval ship and museum ship

Coordinates: 53°30′49″N 8°8′19″E

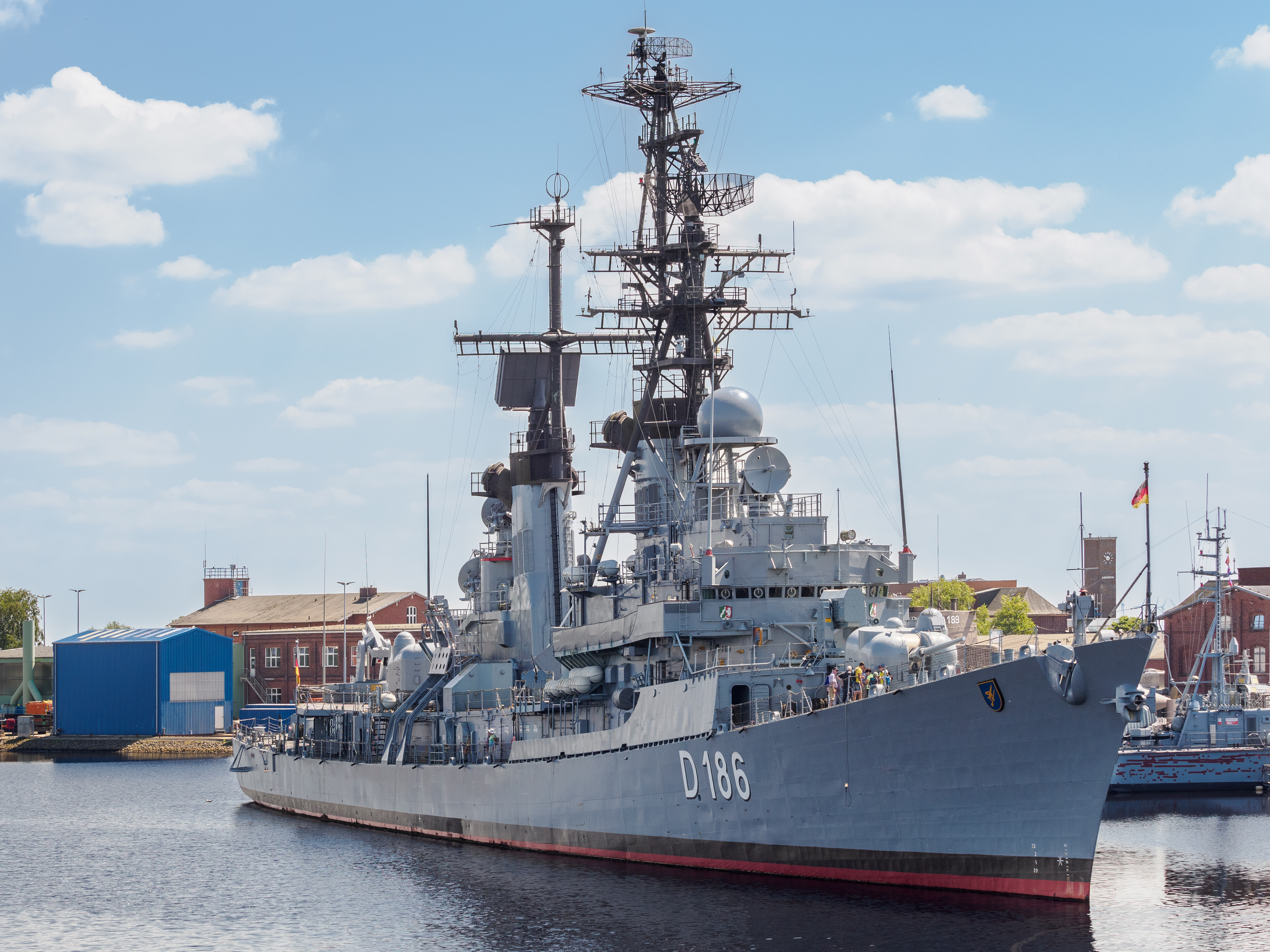
- Museum ship Mölders

History

Germany
- Name: Mölders
- Namesake: Werner Mölders
- Ordered: 3 March 1965
- Builder: Bath Iron Works, Bath, Maine
- Laid down: 12 April 1966
- Launched: 13 April 1967
- Commissioned: 23 February 1969
- Decommissioned: 28 May 2003
- Status: Museum ship at Wilhelmshaven

General characteristics
- Class & type: Lütjens-class destroyer
- Displacement: 4,800 t (4,724 long tons) standard
- Length: 134 m (439 ft 8 in)
- Beam: 14.5 m (47 ft 7 in)
- Draught: 6.5 m (21 ft 4 in)
- Propulsion: 2 × turbines; 4 × high-pressure steam boilers; 2 × shafts; 70,000 PS (51 MW)
- Speed: 33 knots (61 km/h; 38 mph)
- Complement: 334
- Armament: 2 × 127 mm/54 Mk 42 mod 10 guns 2 × Rheinmetall Rh202 20 mm autocannons 1 × Mk 13 Model 4 Missile Launcher (32 SM-1MR Missiles and 8 Harpoon Missiles) 2 × Mk 49 Rolling Airframe (RAM) Missile Launcher (21 RAM surface-to-air missiles) 6 × 324 mm torpedo tubes, DM4A1 and Mark 46 torpedoes 1 × RUR-5 ASROC launcher (8 ASROC Missiles)

Mölders (D186) was one of three Lütjens-class guided-missile destroyers, a modified version of the American Charles F. Adams class, built for the Bundesmarine (West German Navy) during the 1960s.

== Design and description ==
The Charles F. Adams class was based on a stretched Forrest Sherman-class destroyer hull modified to accommodate an RUR-5 ASROC Launcher and its associated equipment. The ships had an overall length of 134.4 meters (440 ft 11 in), a beam of 14.4 meters (47 ft 3 in) and a deep draft of 4.5 meters (14 ft 9 in). They displaced 4,526 metric tons (4,455 long tons) at full load. Their crew consisted of 333 officers and enlisted men.

The ships were equipped with two geared General Electric steam turbines, each driving one propeller shaft, using steam provided by four D-V2M water-tube boilers. The turbines were intended to produce 70,000 shaft horsepower (52,000 kW) to reach the designed speed of 36 knots (67 km/h; 41 mph). The Lütjens class had a range of 4,500 nautical miles (8,300 km; 5,200 mi) at a speed of 20 knots (37 km/h; 23 mph). Unlike their half-sisters, the ships had two macks.

They were armed with two 5-inch/54-caliber Mark 42 gun, one each forward and aft of the superstructure. The ships were fitted with an eight-round ASROC launcher between the funnels. Close-range anti-submarine defense was provided by two triple sets of 324-millimetre (12.75 in) Mk 32 torpedo tubes. The primary armament of the ships was the Tartar surface-to-air missile system designed to defend a carrier battle group. They were fired via the single-arm Mk 13 missile launcher and the ships stowed a total of 40 missiles for the launcher.

== Construction and career ==
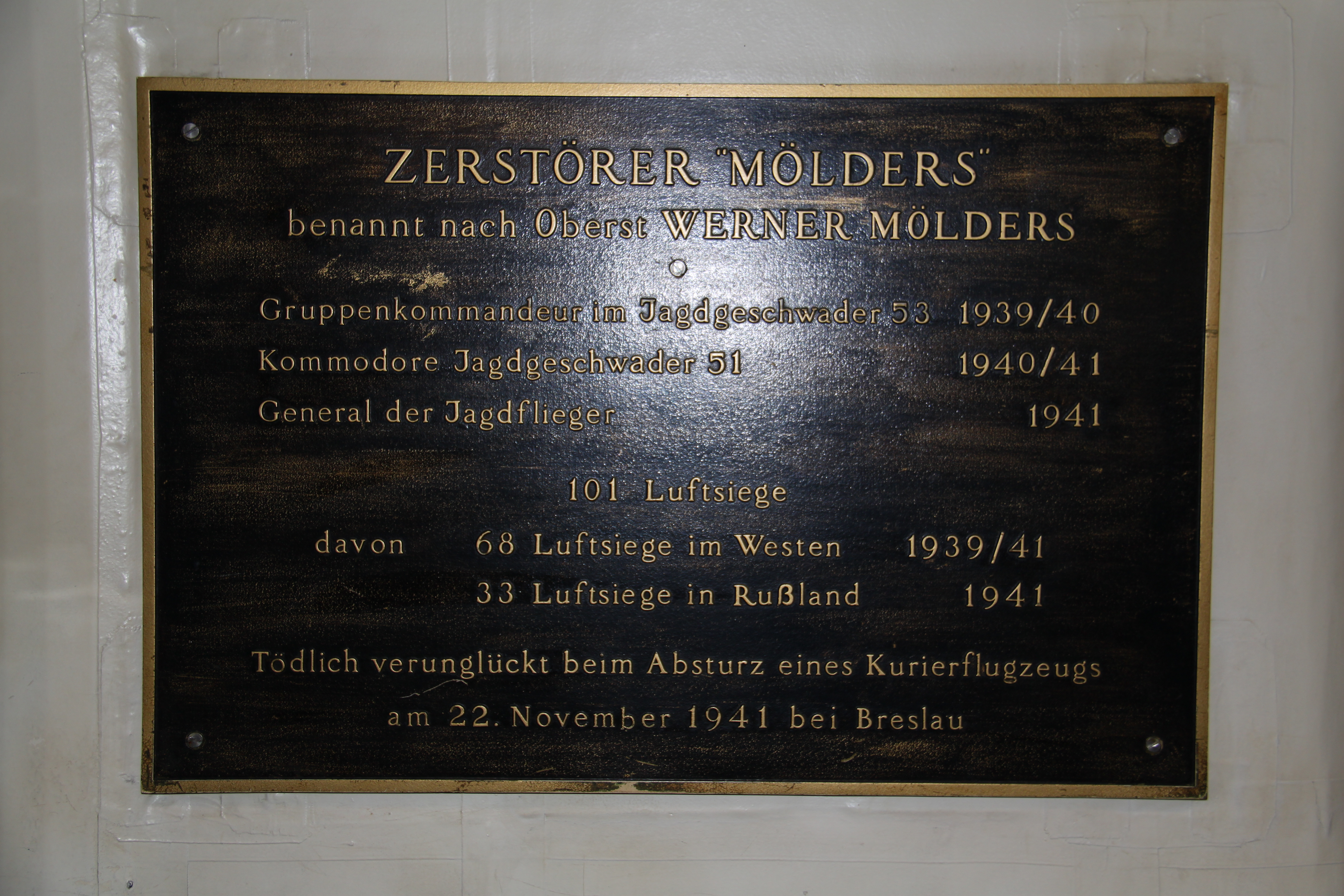
Plaquette of destroyer Mölders at the German Naval Museum Wilhelmshaven

On 3 March 1965 Bath Iron Works got the order to build Mölders and her keel was laid down on 12 April 1966 with the hull number DDG-29. On 13 April 1967 Mölders was launched and christened for Luftwaffe Oberst (Colonel) Werner Mölders by his mother Anne-Marie Mölders. Mölders was commissioned on 23 February 1969 into the 1. Zerstörergeschwader (first destroyer squadron) based in Kiel.

During her 33 years in commission 14,000 sailors served on her under 16 commanders, and she traveled 675,054.6 nautical miles (1,250,201.1 km; 776,839.0 mi). Mölders was decommissioned 28 May 2003 in Wilhelmshaven.

Unlike her sisters Lütjens and Rommel, Mölders was preserved and is now on display as museum ship at the Deutsches Marinemuseum at Wilhelmshaven, although she was never stationed in Wilhelmshaven during her active career. She is the sole surviving member of the Charles F Adams-class destroyers.
