= Aircraft handler =

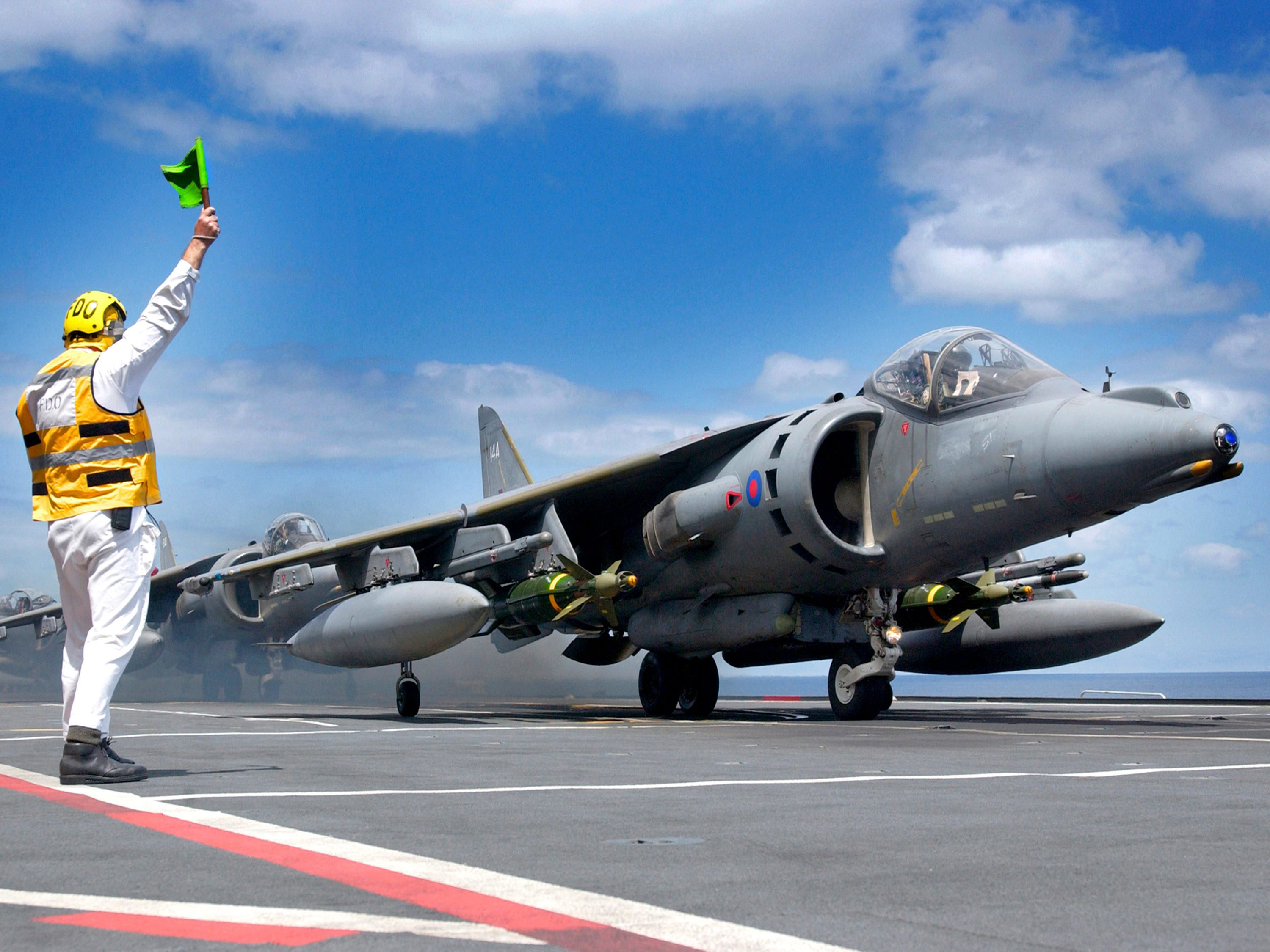
An Aircraft Handler with a Harrier GR7A preparing to take off from HMS Invincible in the Gulf of Oman in 2005

An aircraft handler is a member of the Aircraft Handling branch in the Royal Navy of the British Armed Forces. Aircraft Handlers are responsible for the safe movement, launching (taking off) and recovering (landing) of all aircraft on board ships within the Royal Navy and some of the Royal Fleet Auxiliary. They are also responsible for aircraft crash rescue and fire fighting duties on board Royal Navy ships and at Royal Naval Air Stations. The Aircraft Handling branch of the Fleet Air Arm in the Royal Navy was formed in 1945. Beforehand the duties of Aircraft Handlers were performed by members of other branches of the Navy, many of whom transferred to the new branch upon its formation.

"Specialist aircraft handling, crash rescue and fire fighting are required at sea on all ships with aircraft embarked. These skills are provided by the Aircraft Handler ratings who are also employed ashore for fire fighting duties, principally at Royal Naval Air Stations." – MOD (Navy)

Some 10,000 men have served in the branch since its formation in 1945, and many of them are still scattered around the country and worldwide. Only about 10% of these are members of the Aircraft Handlers Association. The Aircraft Handlers Association is there for past and present serving members of the branch. It produces a quarterly publication that has articles and news that is of interest to all members of the branch. It also organizes annual reunions and events so members can catch up with old "shipmates".

Today the Aircraft Handling branch is made up of around 450 personnel who serve on various ships and at Royal Naval Air Stations.

== Training ==
New recruits into the Aircraft Handling branch initially complete basic training with other Naval recruits at HMS Raleigh in Cornwall for 10 weeks. Here they are trained in the basic skills required to serve in the British armed forces/Royal Navy. Upon successful completion of basic training all recruits into the Aircraft Handling branch then proceed to RNAS Culdrose in Cornwall; here they are instructed at the Royal Naval School of Flight Deck Operations (RNSFDO). The training at RNSFDO is around 6 months and covers the two key skills required of an Aircraft Handler. The first phase is fire fighting, which sees recruits learn aircraft crash rescue fire fighting skills, however new recruits also learn skills required for domestic fire fighting, the safe use and control of breathing apparatus, road traffic incidents and various other skills that would be required as would be for the civilian fire service. The second phase of training is Aircraft Handling which sees recruits learning the skills required for the safe movement, take off and landing of aircraft on board Royal Navy ships and at Royal Naval air stations. The training for this role is carried out on a full-size mock-up flight deck known as HMS Siskin (Dummy Deck). HMS Siskin is largely made up to replicate the Invincible-class aircraft carrier but can also be adapted to the roles of smaller ships such as frigates and destroyers. New recruits are now also able to gain NVQ qualifications in firefighting skills.

== Organisation ==
The Aircraft Handling branch is part of the Fleet Air Arm. The Aircraft Handling branch is also the Royal Navy's fire service and is known to the Royal Navy as the Royal Navy Fire Rescue Service (RNFRS). The RNFRS, Royal Air Force Fire and Rescue Service and British Army counterparts are now collectively under an organisation known as Defence Fire Risk Management Organisation (DFRMO).

== Badges and motto ==
Aircraft Handlers are sometimes known as "Chockheads", which was the name given to them at first by other branches within the Royal Navy, based on some of the tasks that they used to carry out. The badge of the branch is a similar design to that of a Naval Air Squadron. It shows the two key roles carried out by the branch: in the background is the sea with fire rising from it, an in the foreground a Harrier jet aircraft with two hands cupped around it.

The motto of the branch in Latin is "Nostris In Manibus Tuti", which translates as "Safe In Our Hands". The trade badge worn by Aircraft Handlers on their uniforms shows an aircraft (Sopwith Camel) with the letter H underneath it. A star above the plane indicates the rate of naval airman, two stars indicate leading airman, and a crown indicates the rate of a petty officer airman and also a chief petty officer airman.

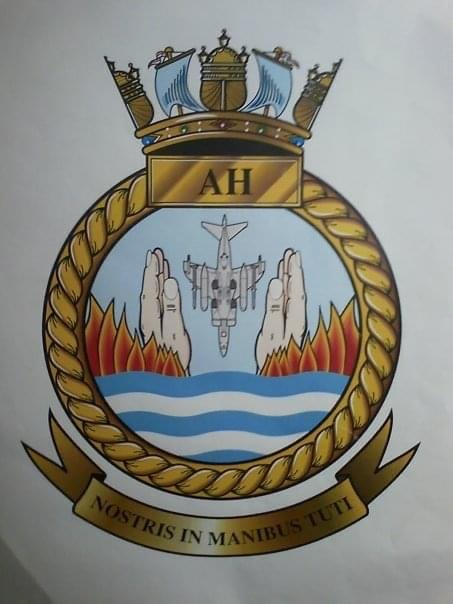
The Branch Badge of The Aircraft Handlers

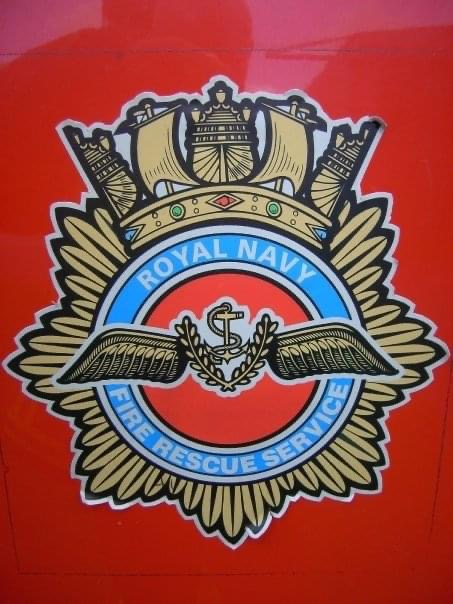
Badge of the Royal Navy Fire and Rescue Service

== Rate structure ==
- Naval airman
- Leading airman
- Petty officer airman
- Chief petty officer airman (often known as a chief handler)
- Warrant officer

All recruits join as the rate of naval airman. Promotion up to the rates of petty officer airman is decided on selection and successful completion of an advanced professional course, and command and leadership courses. Promotion from petty officer airman up to warrant officer is also decided on selection, but no further professional courses are required.

== Current equipment and vehicles ==
Aircraft Handlers use various types of vehicles and equipment to complete their fire fighting tasks, most of which is the same as the equipment used by most civil fire services, with the exception of the vehicles. At Royal Naval Air Stations, Aircraft Handlers are employed mainly at fire stations where they will use two types of fire vehicle, these being the Rapid Intervention Vehicle (RIV) and the Major Foam Vehicle (MFV). They also use other types of equipment such as Drager breathing apparatus, Clan Lucas cutting equipment, various sized extending ladders and airbag lifting equipment.

Aircraft Handlers also use different equipment when they are based on board ships, such as NMATT tractors, EN Mechanical Handlers and RAM to move aircraft. To carry out their fire fighting role they use fixed fire hoses from the ships system and other fire fighting equipment like 10 kg CO_{2} extinguishers and SF 90 foam extinguishers.

== Location ==
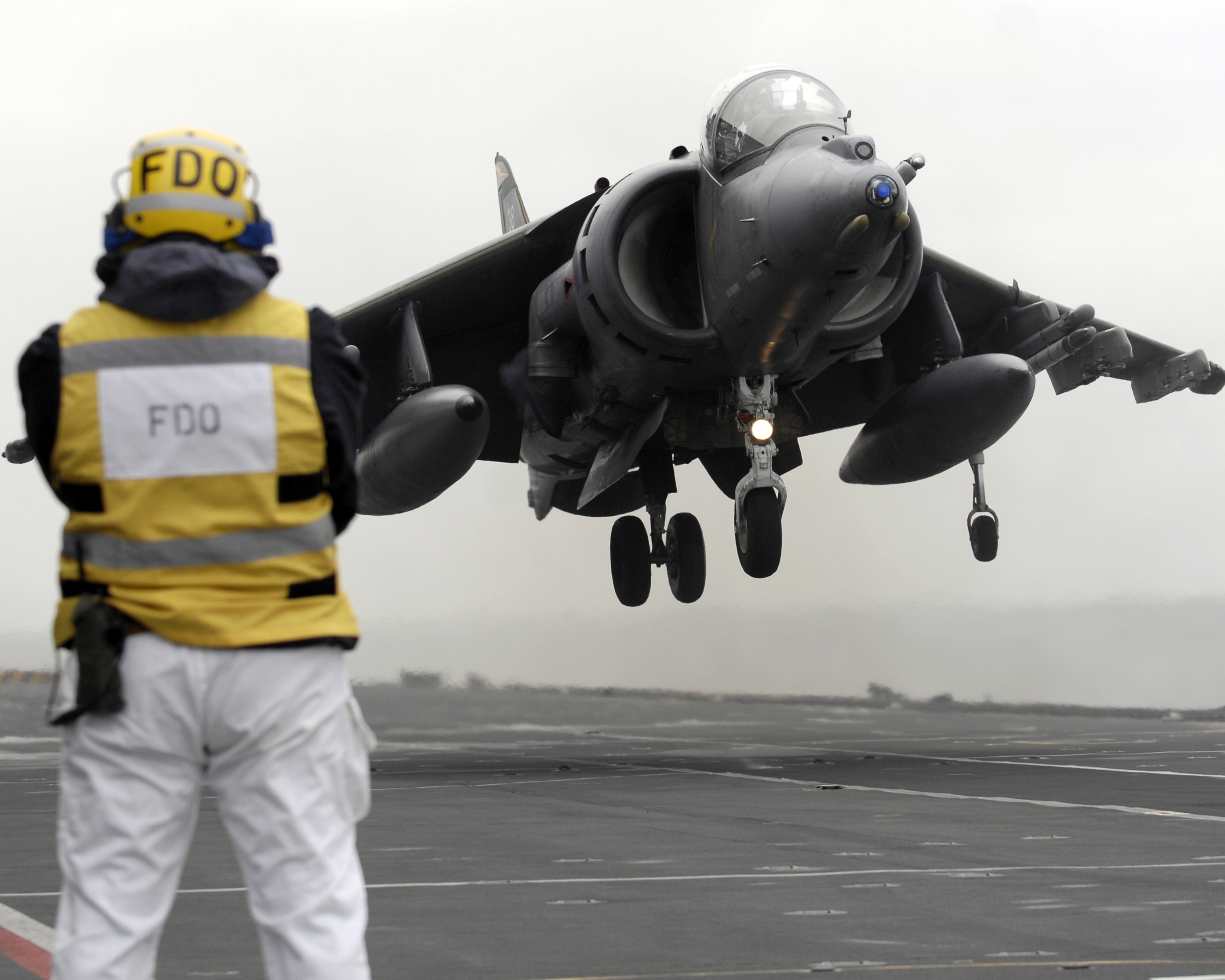
An Aircraft Handler with a Harrier GR9 landing on HMS Illustrious at sea in 2007

Aircraft Handlers may find themselves in a variety of locations such as being on board an aircraft carrier or being at a fire station on an air station. Fire stations that Aircraft Handlers are usually based at are RNAS Culdrose in Cornwall and RNAS Yeovilton in Somerset, but some Aircraft Handlers are based at fire stations at RAF Cottesmore in Rutland and RAF Wittering in Cambridgeshire. Aircraft Handlers are mostly based on board Royal Navy ships such as aircraft carriers Illustrious and Ark Royal (Portsmouth), amphibious ships HMS Albion and Bulwark, and the Royal Navy's helicopter carrier HMS Ocean (Plymouth). They can also serve on board various Royal Fleet Auxiliary ships (various locations). Some Aircraft Handlers are also attached to Naval Air Squadrons which are based at Royal Naval Air Stations Yeovilton and Culdrose.

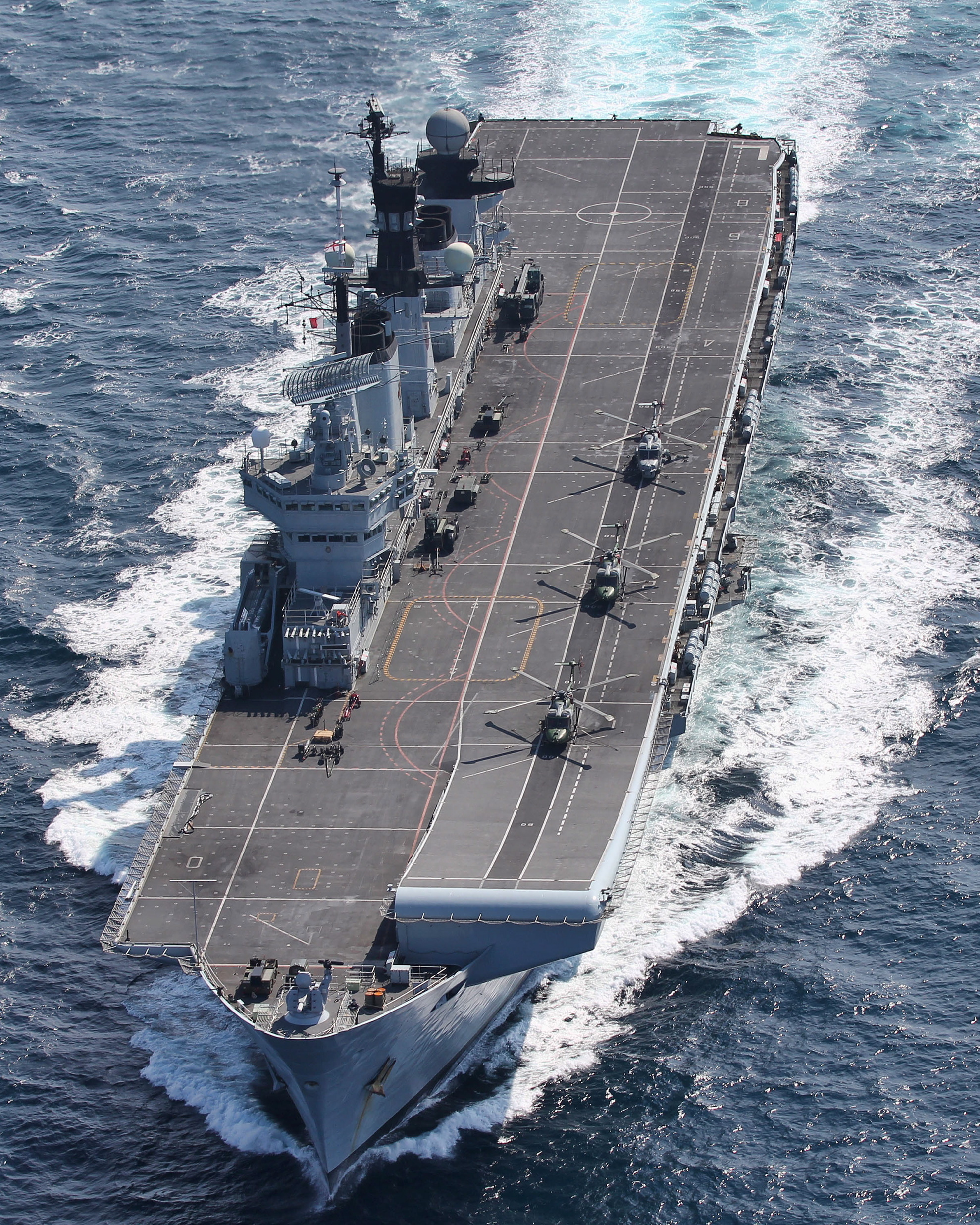
HMS Illustrious

== Future ==
The Royal Navy is due to increase the personnel numbers within the branch due to the Government's plans to introduce the new Queen Elizabeth-class aircraft carriers into service. The new carriers HMS Queen Elizabeth and HMS Prince of Wales will require large numbers of Aircraft Handlers to operate the new Joint Strike Fighter aircraft that will also come into service with the new carriers.

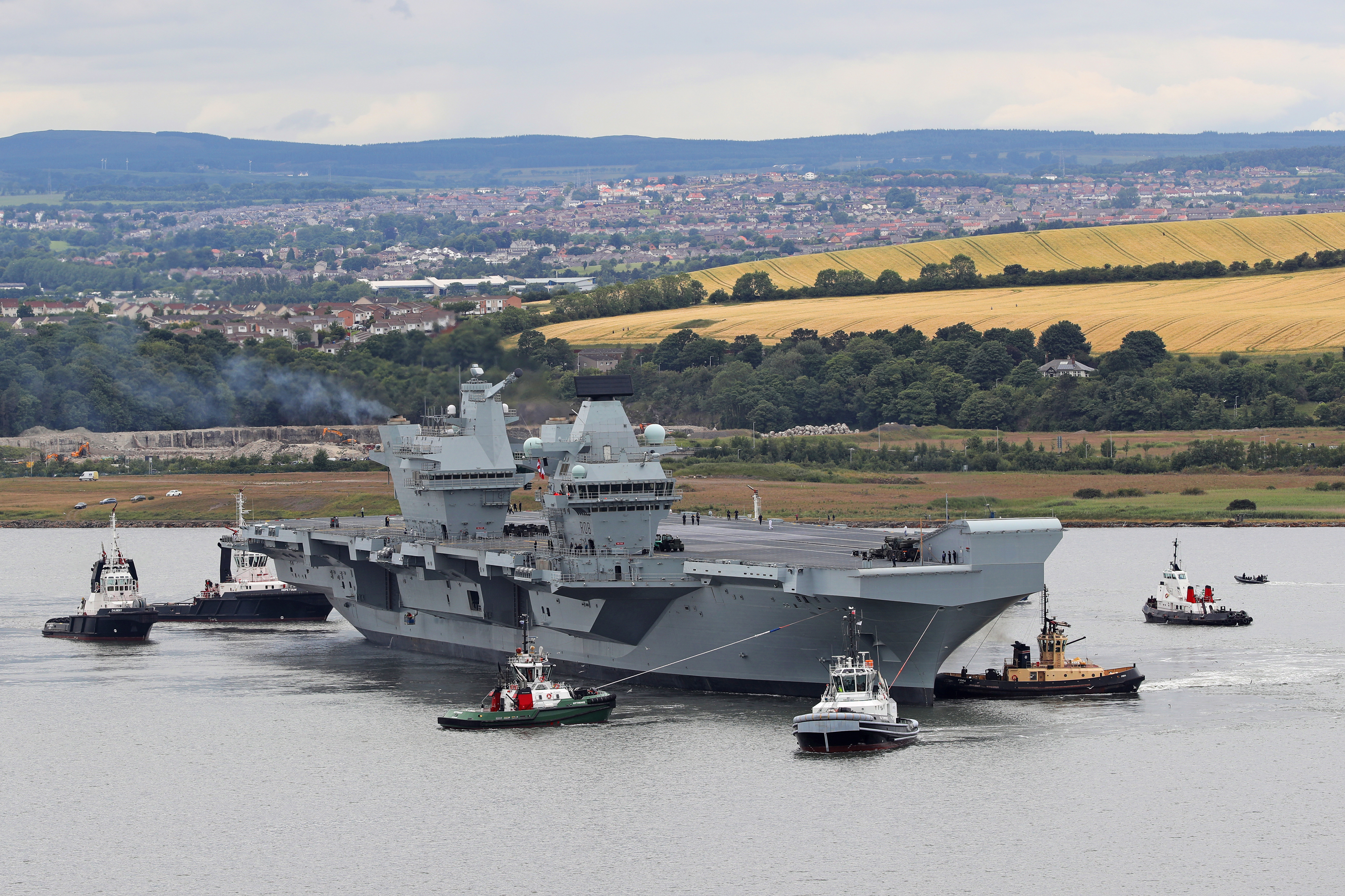

== See also ==
- List of air stations of the Royal Navy
