= USS Carl M. Levin =

US Navy Arleigh Burke-class destroyer

- USS Carl M. Levin operating in 3rd fleet. 8 May 2026

History

United States
- Name: Carl M. Levin
- Namesake: Carl Levin
- Ordered: 14 March 2014
- Builder: Bath Iron Works
- Laid down: 1 February 2019
- Launched: 16 May 2021
- Sponsored by: Kate Levin Markel; Laura Levin; Erica Levin
- Christened: 2 October 2021
- Acquired: 26 January 2023
- Commissioned: 24 June 2023
- Home port: Pearl Harbor
- Identification: Hull number DDG-120
- Motto: Tenacious in the Fight
- Status: In active service
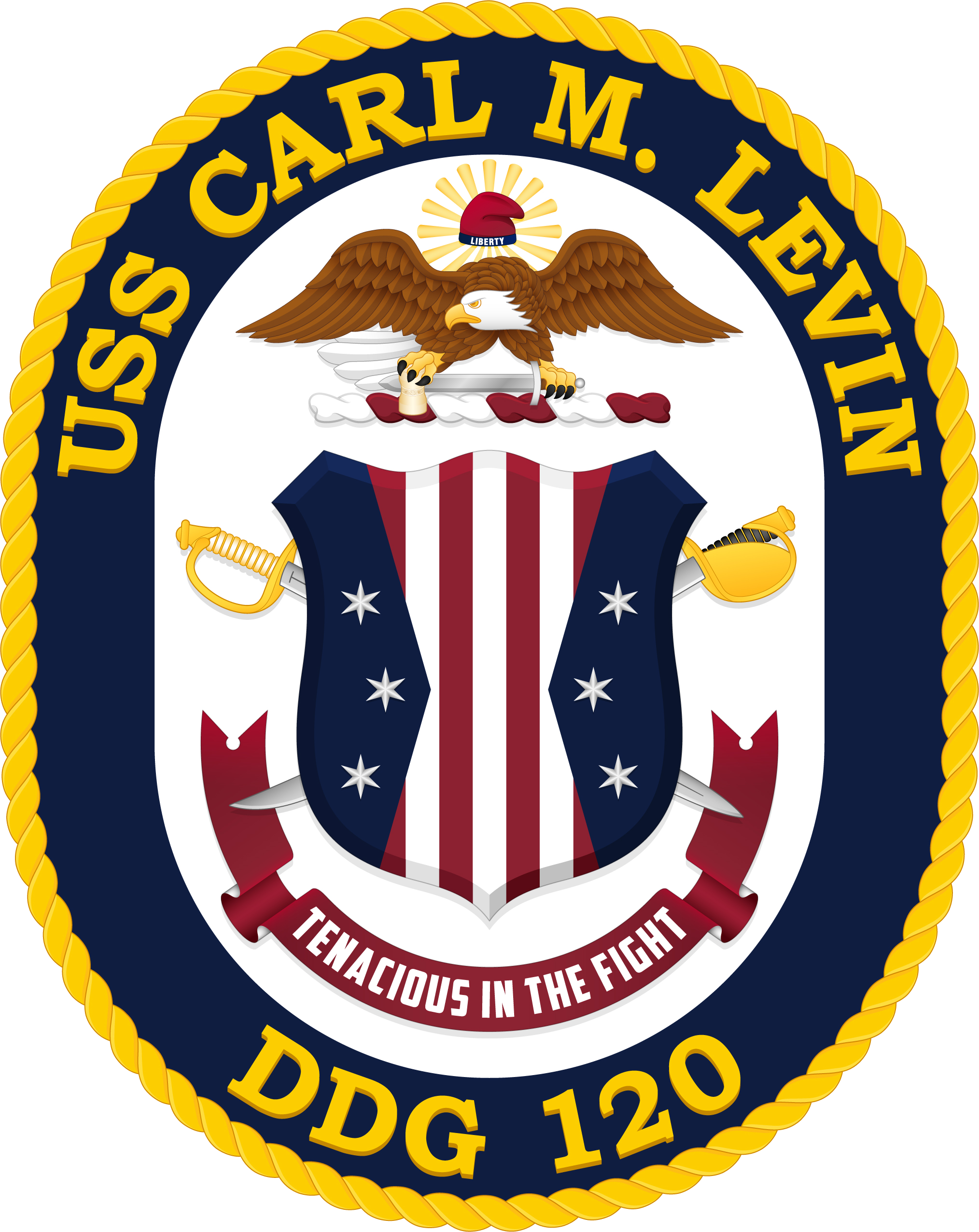
- Badge

General characteristics
- Class & type: Arleigh Burke-class destroyer
- Displacement: 9,300 long tons (full load)
- Length: 509 ft (155 m)
- Beam: 66 ft (20 m)
- Draft: 31 ft (9.4 m)
- Propulsion: 4 × General Electric LM2500 gas turbines 100,000 shp (75,000 kW)
- Speed: 31 knots (57 km/h; 36 mph)
- Complement: 380 officers and enlisted
- Armament: Guns: 1 × 5-inch (127 mm)/62 Mk 45 Mod 4 (lightweight gun); 1 × 20 mm (0.8 in) Phalanx CIWS; 2 × 25 mm (0.98 in) Mk 38 machine gun system; 4 × 0.50 in (12.7 mm) caliber guns; Missiles: 1 × 32-cell, 1 × 64-cell (96 total cells) Mk 41 vertical launching system (VLS): RIM-66M surface-to-air missile; RIM-156 surface-to-air missile; RIM-174A Standard ERAM; RIM-161 anti-ballistic missile; RIM-162 ESSM (quad-packed); BGM-109 Tomahawk cruise missile; RUM-139 vertical launch ASROC; Torpedoes: 2 × Mark 32 triple torpedo tubes: Mark 46 lightweight torpedo; Mark 50 lightweight torpedo; Mark 54 lightweight torpedo; Drones: 1 × 8-cell Block 3/Coyote LE SR drone launcher
- Aircraft carried: 2 × MH-60R Seahawk helicopters
- Aviation facilities: Double hangar and helipad

USS Carl M. Levin (DDG-120) is an Arleigh Burke-class (Flight IIA Technology Insertion) Aegis guided missile destroyer. The ship is named for Carl Levin, a former United States Senator and Chairman of the United States Senate Committee on Armed Services.

== Construction and career ==
The contract for the ship, along with the name, was first announced in a press release from General Dynamics, parent company of Bath Iron Works, on 31 March 2016. The official designation of DDG-120 as Carl M. Levin by Secretary of the Navy Ray Mabus was announced on 11 April 2016.

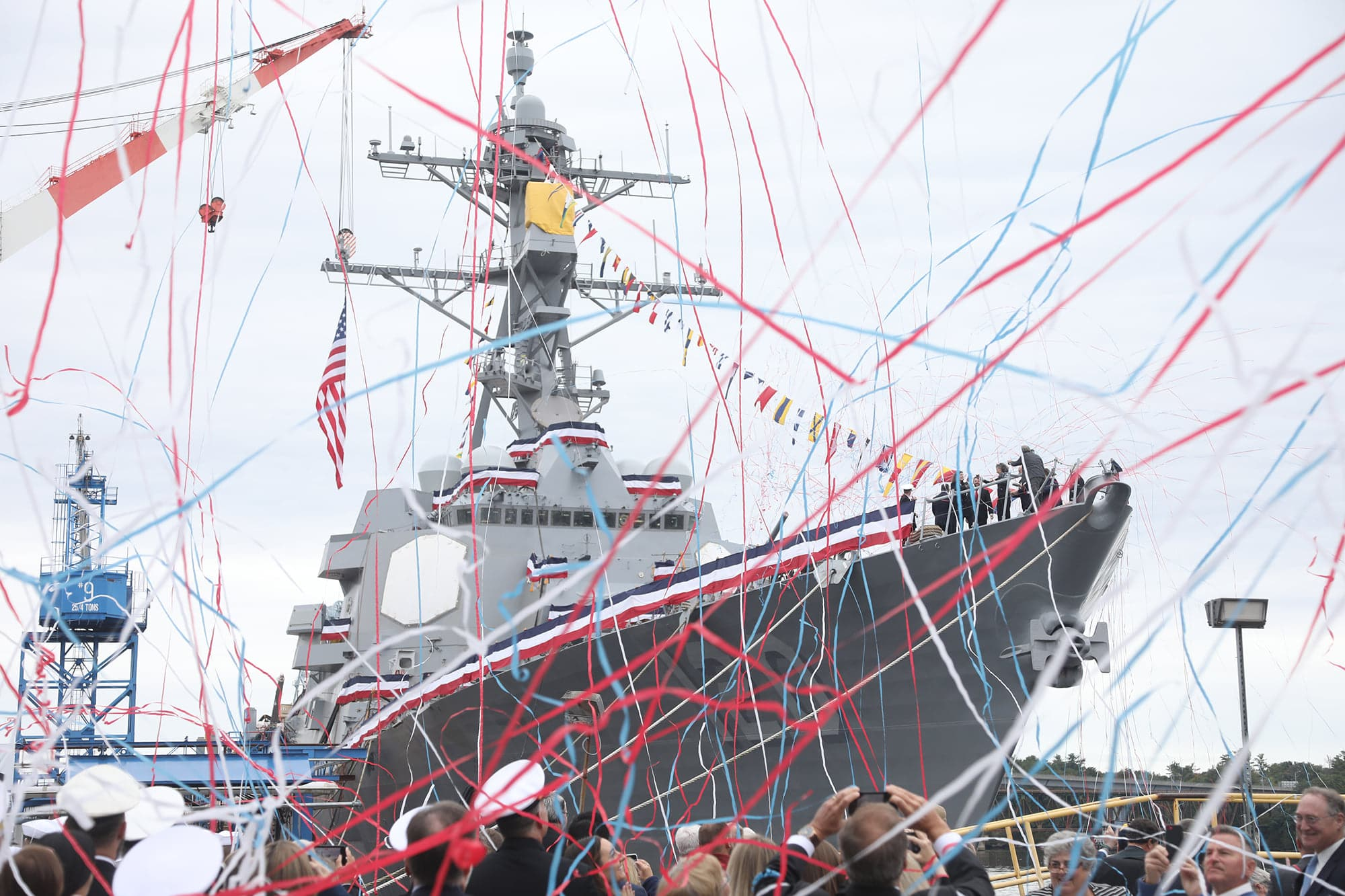
USS Carl M. Levin at her christening ceremony on 2 October 2021

On 2 October 2021, Carl M. Levin was christened at the Bath Iron Works shipyard in Bath, Maine. She is the 42nd Flight IIA ship, and the fifth of the "technology insertion" (TI) builds with elements of the follow-on Flight III series. She is fitted with the Aegis Combat System baseline 9 which includes integrated air and missile defense capability.

Carl M. Levin completed her sea trials on 9 December 2022 and delivered to the United States Navy on 26 January 2023.

The ship was commissioned in Baltimore, Maryland on 24 June 2023, and arrived in her first homeport, Pearl Harbor, on 7 August 2023. Her battle flag features a kraken splitting a pirate ship in two, designed by one of her sailors in an internal competition.

== Service History ==
USS Carl M. Levin (DDG 120) arrives in Los Angeles for Los Angeles Fleet Week, May 20, 2025.

From 21-26 May 2025, Carl M. Levin participated in the Los Angles Fleet Week 2025 for ship tours. At the event, her dodgeball team won first place in a contest hosted by Fox Sports.

In August of 2025, she was sailing in the Aleutian Islands for "routine operations" with Newsweek reporting the nearby presence of a Russian and Chinese flotilla. The ship notably visiting Unalaska on 8 August 2025 during this time and was spotted near Adak, Alaska.

On 7 December 2025, Carl M. Levin completed a pass-in-review during the 84th National Pearl Harbor Remembrance Day ceremony at the Pearl Harbor National Memorial.

For Exercise Rim of the Pacific (RIMPAC) 2026, she was one of the ships opened for tours to participating nations and family members.

Since 9 September 2026, the ship has been deployed to the U.S. 5th Fleet area of operations.

== Design Modifications ==
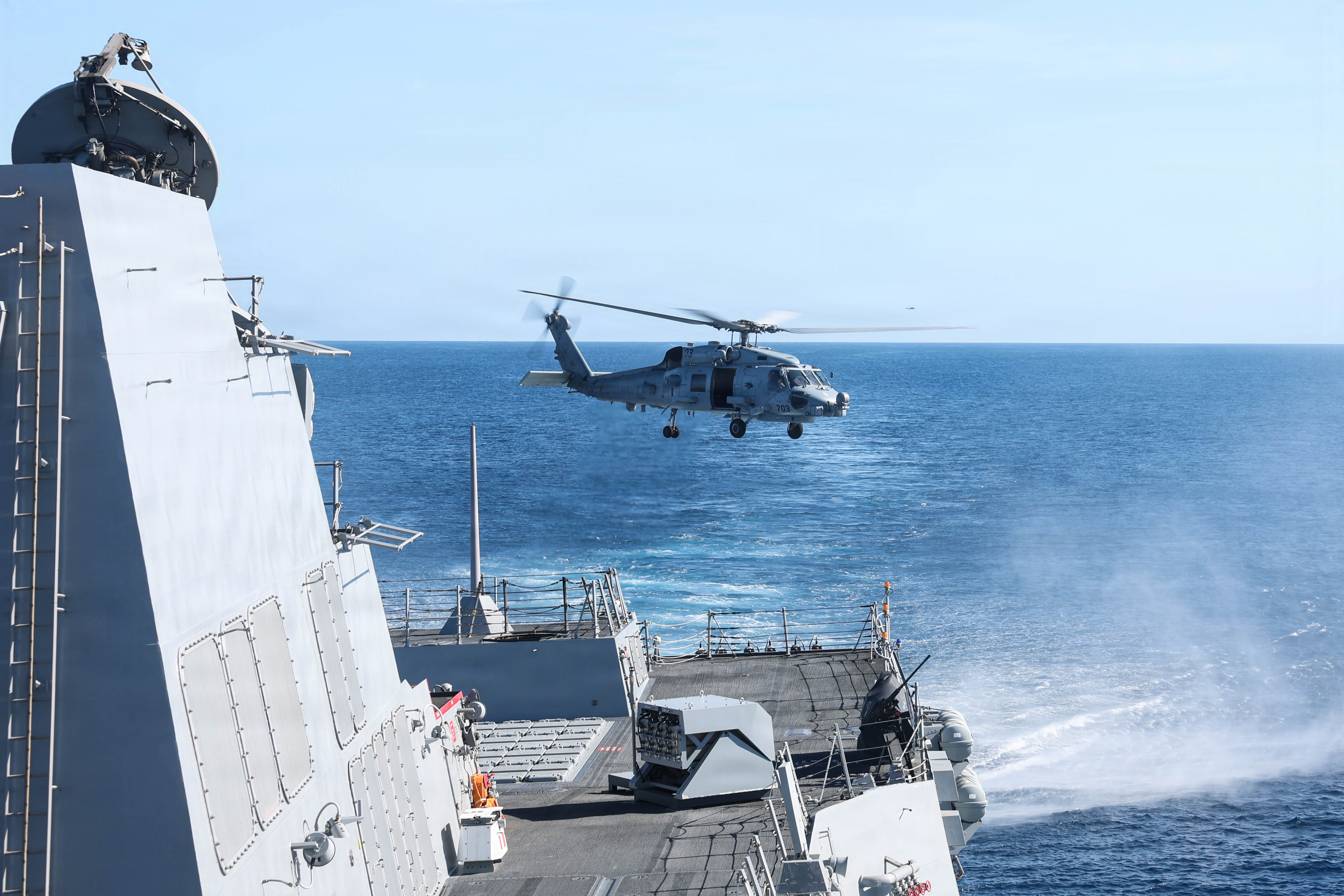
The coyote drone launcher seen on the aft right next to the VLS launchers

On April 8, 2026, Carl M. Levin had been seen docked in the Pacific Ocean with a new mysterious launcher that can found within the aft of the ship between her port-side torpedo tubes and VLS launchers. Following the sighting, a U.S. Navy spokesperson had revealed the mysterious launcher we're part of the Navy's counter-unmanned aircraft system (C-UAS) program. The launcher revealed to be an upgraded version of the Block 3/Coyote LE SR launcher previously seen on the USS Bainbridge and USS Winston S. Churchill. The Coyote launcher had received four more cells totaling to eight cells.

== Ship's Seal ==
Seal: The coat of arms as blazoned in full color on a white oval, enclosed by a dark blue border edged on the outside with a gold rope and inscribed “USS CARL M. LEVIN” above and “DDG 120” below in gold.

=== Blazon ===
Shield: Gules, three pales Argent between two square flaunches Azure (Dark Blue) bearing six six-pointed mullets, three and three Argent (Silver Gray).

Crest: From a wreath Argent and Azure a bald eagle crouched wings inverted Proper, clutching in dexter claw a Senate gavel Proper and in sinister claw a sword fesswise Proper; in chief radiant light Or surmounted by a Phrygian cap Gules, banded of the second and inscribed “LIBERTY” of the first.

Supporters: Saltirewise a United States Navy Officer’s sword and Chief Petty Officer’s cutlass saltirewise, points downward.

Motto: A tri-parted scroll Gules doubled Argent inscribed “TENACIOUS IN THE FIGHT” of the last.

=== Symbolism ===
Shield: The hourglass shaped division of the field resembles the shape of the historic Senate gavel, implying Mr. Levin’s service as a United States Senator. The six six-pointed stars honor Mr. Levin’s 36 years in the Senate. The seven vertical stripes over a blue field denote USS CARL M. LEVIN (DDG 120) as the 70th ship in its class. The national colors of the United States are Red, White and Blue.

Crest: The bald eagle, embodying the spirit of the United States, emphasizes the nation’s virtues of life, liberty and the pursuit of happiness. The sword and Senate gavel allude to Mr. Levin’s service as a Senator and position of Chairman of the Armed Services Committee. The Phrygian (Liberty) cap amongst the radiant light conveys Mr. Levin’s work to protect the Great Lakes and their many lighthouses along Michigan’s coastline. The Liberty cap, adapted from the United States Senate Seal, conveys the paramount nature of America’s ethics and values, emphasized by the golden radiant light. Additionally, the eagle is featured on the coat of arms of the State of Michigan, in tribute to Mr. Levin’s home state.

Supporters: The Navy Officer sword and enlisted cutlass pay tribute to the command and crew, representing authority, professionalism and unity in the accomplishment of their mission.

Motto: The motto, “TENACIOUS IN THE FIGHT,” expresses the steadfast and determined motivation of the command and crew to triumph over adversity.
