= Manning the rail =

Method of rendering honors used by naval vessels

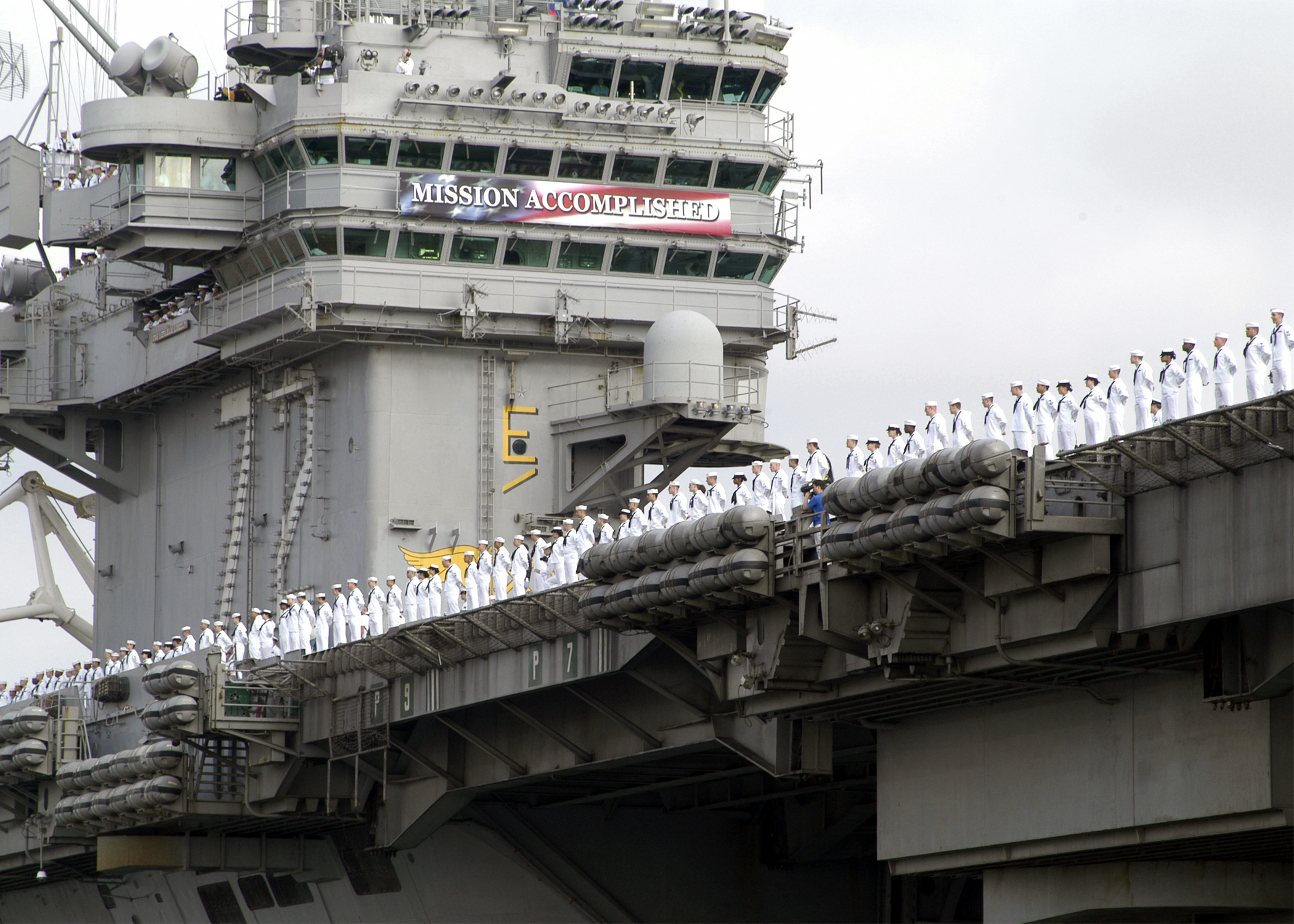
Sailors of the USS Abraham Lincoln man the rails during her return to port after participating in Operation Iraqi Freedom

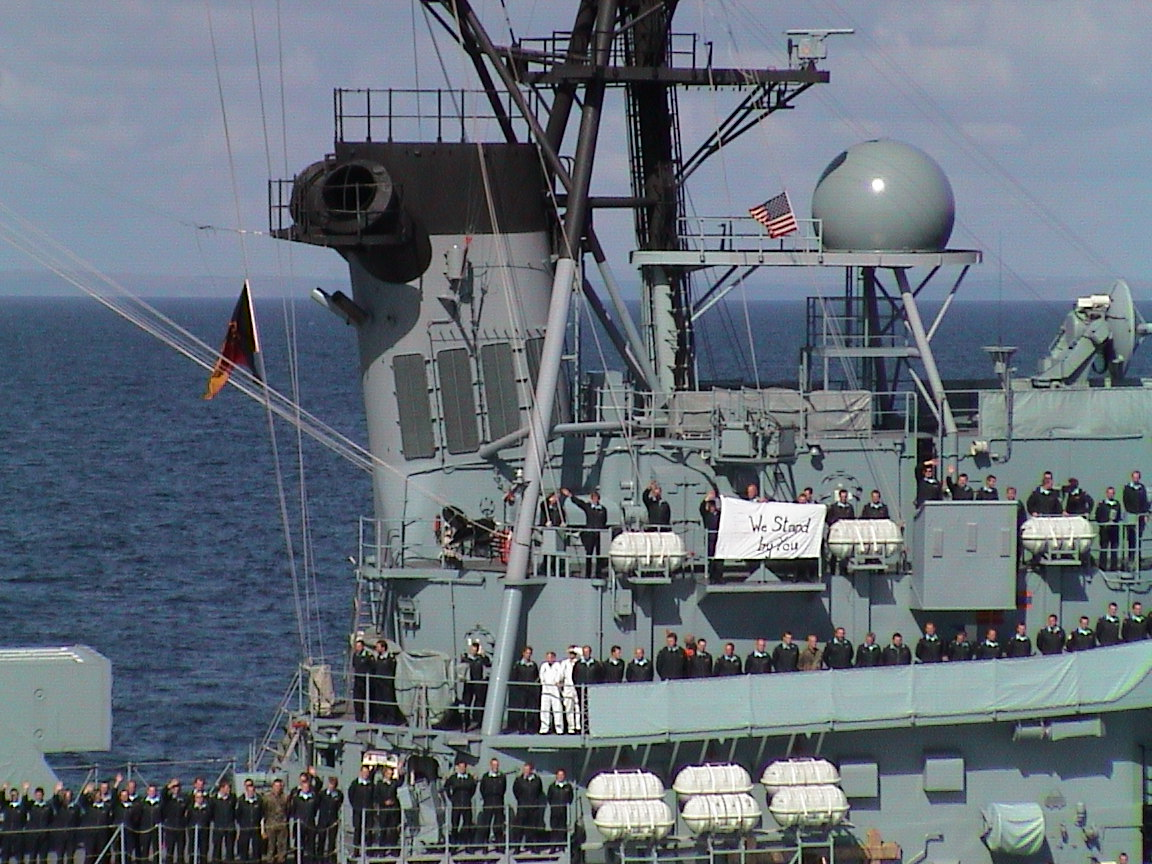
Lütjens rendering honours to USS Winston S. Churchill after the 11 September attacks

Manning the rail is a method of saluting (or rendering honors) used by naval vessels. The custom evolved from that of "manning the yards", which dates from the days of sail. On sailing ships, crew stood evenly spaced on all the yards (the spars holding the sails) and gave three cheers to honor distinguished persons. Today, the crew are stationed along the rails and superstructure of a ship when honors are rendered.

The United States Navy prescribes manning the rail as a possible honor to render to the President of the United States and for the heads of state of foreign nations. A similar but less formal ceremony is to have the crew "at quarters" when the ship is entering or leaving port. Manning the rail is also the traditional way to honor the USS Arizona Memorial when it is passed by all U.S. Navy, U.S. Coast Guard and U.S. Merchant Marine vessels. More recently, as foreign military vessels are entering Pearl Harbor for joint military exercises, foreign sailors have participated in the traditional manning the rails. Notable instances occurred on July 24, 1997, when the guided-missile destroyer USS Ramage and the frigate USS Halyburton rendered honors to the USS Constitution during her 200th birthday celebration, and on September 14, 2001, when the crew of the German destroyer Lütjens manned the rails as they approached the destroyer USS Winston Churchill and displayed an American flag and a banner reading "We Stand By You".

== Sea and anchor detail ==
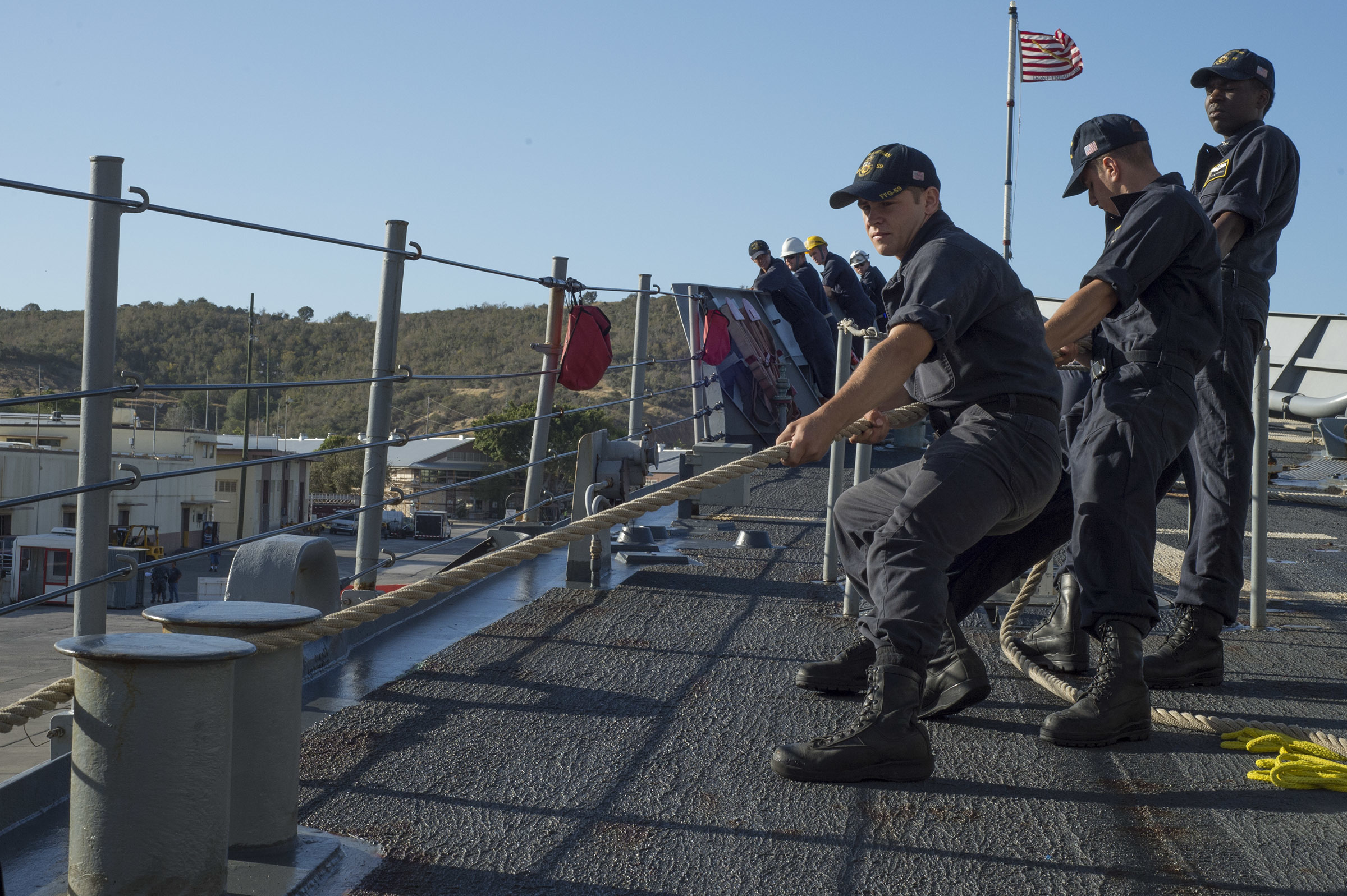
Sea and anchor detail conducting line-pulling

A sea and anchor detail is a team of personnel on a ship tasked with certain duties to assist with safely navigating between open ocean and confined waters, such as when pulling into a port or getting underway when leaving a port. Duties may include navigating, steering, line-pulling and dropping/weighing an anchor.
