= Lütjens-class destroyer =

1969 class of German Navy destroyer

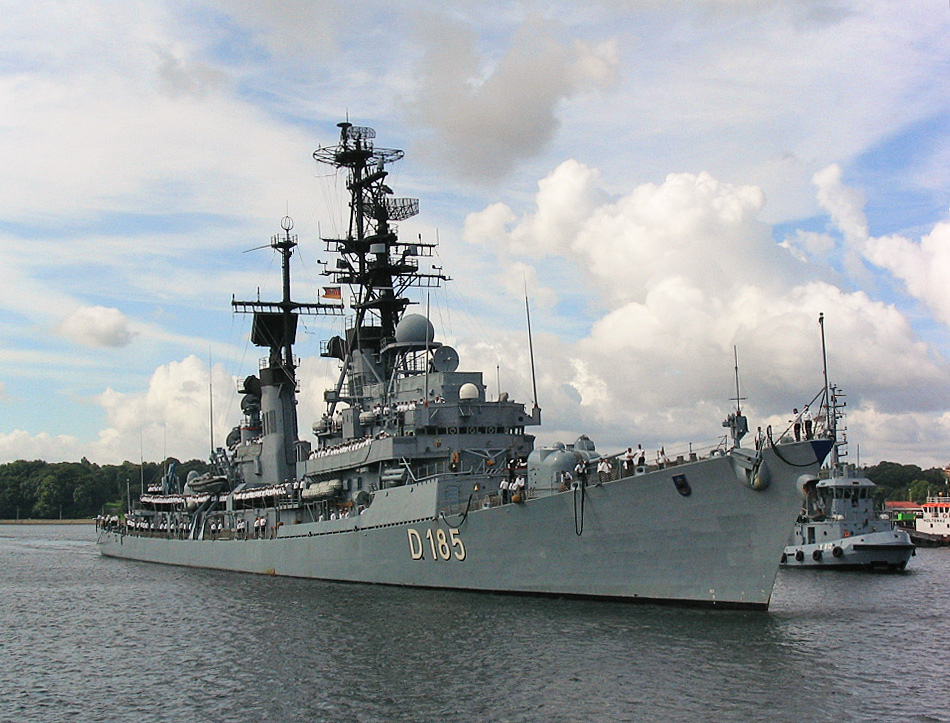
- Lütjens

Class overview
- Name: Type 103 Lütjens
- Builders: Bath Iron Works, Maine (3)
- Operators: German Navy
- Succeeded by: Sachsen class
- Built: 1966–1970
- In commission: 1969–2003
- Completed: 3
- Retired: 3
- Preserved: 1

General characteristics
- Class & type: Guided missile destroyer
- Displacement: 4,720 t
- Length: 133.2 m (437 ft 0 in)
- Beam: 14.3 m (46 ft 11 in)
- Draft: 6.1 m (20 ft 0 in)
- Propulsion: 2 × steam turbines providing 70,000 shp (52,000 kW); 2 shafts; 4 × 1,275 psi (8,790 kPa) boilers
- Speed: 33 knots (61 km/h)
- Range: 4,500 nautical miles (8,300 km) at 20 kn (37 km/h)
- Complement: 337
- Sensors & processing systems: AN/SPS-40 2D air surveillance and early-warning radar, long-range; AN/SPS-67 sea surveillance radar, med-range; AN/SPS-52 3D air surveillance radar, long-range; 2 × AN/SPG-51C Mk 74 fire-control radar; AN/SPQ-9 short range fire-control radar for surface and low flying targets; AN/SPG-53 tracking and fire control radar; Raytheon RP 1225 navigation radar; Atlas Elektronik DSQS-21B active/passive sonar; EADS FL1800 ESM suite
- Electronic warfare & decoys: 2 × SRBOC 6 cell chaff and flare launcher; 1 × AN/SLQ-25 Nixie torpedo decoy; 1 × EADS FL1800 ESM/ECM suite
- Armament: 2 × 127 mm/54 Mk 42 mod 10 guns; 2 × Rheinmetall Mk 20 RH-202 20 mm autocannons; 1 × Mk 13 launcher, 40 Tartar surface-to-air missiles; 2 × Mk 49 launchers, 21 RAM surface-to-air missiles each; 6 × 324 mm torpedo tubes, DM4A1 and Mark 46 torpedoes; 1 × ASROC launcher, 8 cell

The Type 103 Lütjens class was the last class of destroyers in service with the German Navy. The ships were US Charles F. Adams-class guided missile destroyers but with some modifications to meet German requirements. They were replaced by the new Sachsen-class frigates, designated frigate even though they are much larger and more capable in all aspects than the Lütjens-class destroyers.

== Development ==
The three Lütjens destroyers were purchased from the US to provide air defence.

For German use, they received the following modifications:

- Communication systems according to German standards. The Lütjens class had more aerials and a second mast mounted on the aft funnel. The large air surveillance radar was positioned further aft (above the funnel).

In turn, the new antennas and radar location meant that the funnels had to be modified. On the Lütjens the exhaust gases were emitted sideways with two pipes on the port and starboard side of each funnel.

- New location of the sonar array. The Lütjens had their sonar dome located in a bulge directed forward in the bow and not under the bow to reduce the ship's draft.
- Better crew accommodation.

Speeds over 30 knots (56 km/h) could be sustained for only a limited time due to the enormous fuel consumption. With two active boilers the ship could achieve speeds up to 27 knots (50 km/h). Three boilers made 30 knots (56 km/h) achievable. For any speed beyond 30 knots (56 km/h) all four boilers were needed.

== Service ==
The three ships in the class were commissioned in 1969 and 1970. In service, they formed the 1. Zerstörergeschwader ("first destroyer squadron") based in Kiel.

The Lütjens class was upgraded to Type 103A in the 1970s with new digital fire-control computers and better missiles for the old Tartar SM1 missile system. The boilers were also converted to burn lighter oil for logistical reasons instead of the heavy fuel oil that needs to be preheated.

A second major refit was undertaken in the 1980s when the ships were upgraded to Type 103B. Missiles were upgraded with a single Modified Mark 13 missile launcher fitted able to fire the SM-1MR surface-to-air missile and Harpoon anti-ship missile. A typical balance was 32 of the former and 8 of the latter. Fire control was improved with upgraded computers and a new AN/SPG-60 radar which also provided illumination for the missiles.

In the 1990s, the ships in the class each received two RIM-116 RAM launchers and Chaff launchers.

With the decommissioning of Lütjens on 18 December 2003 the age of steam ended for the German Navy. Mölders became a museum ship at the German Navy Museum in Wilhelmshaven.

== List of ships ==
Pennant number	Name	Namesake	Call sign	Builder	Laid down	Launched	Com- missioned	Decom- missioned	Fate	Reference
D185	Lütjens	Admiral Günther Lütjens	DRAE	Bath Iron Works	1 March 1966	11 August 1967	22 March 1969	18 December 2003	2012 scrapped in Aliağa, (Turkey)	
D186	Mölders	Oberst Werner Mölders	DRAF	Bath Iron Works	12 April 1966	13 April 1967	23 February 1969	28 May 2003	Museum ship in Marinearsenal Wilhelmshaven (Germany)	
D187	Rommel	Generalfeldmarschall Erwin Rommel	DRAG	Bath Iron Works	22 August 1967	1 February 1969	2 May 1970	30 September 1998	cannibalized, 2004 scrapped in Aliağa (Turkey)	

All three ships were built by Bath Iron Works in the United States. They were named after famous German officers who died in World War II: Günther Lütjens who had commanded the Bismarck task group, the fighter ace Werner Mölders of the Luftwaffe, and Field Marshal Erwin Rommel.
