= Raytheon Coyote =

Expendable unmanned aerial vehicle

Coyote
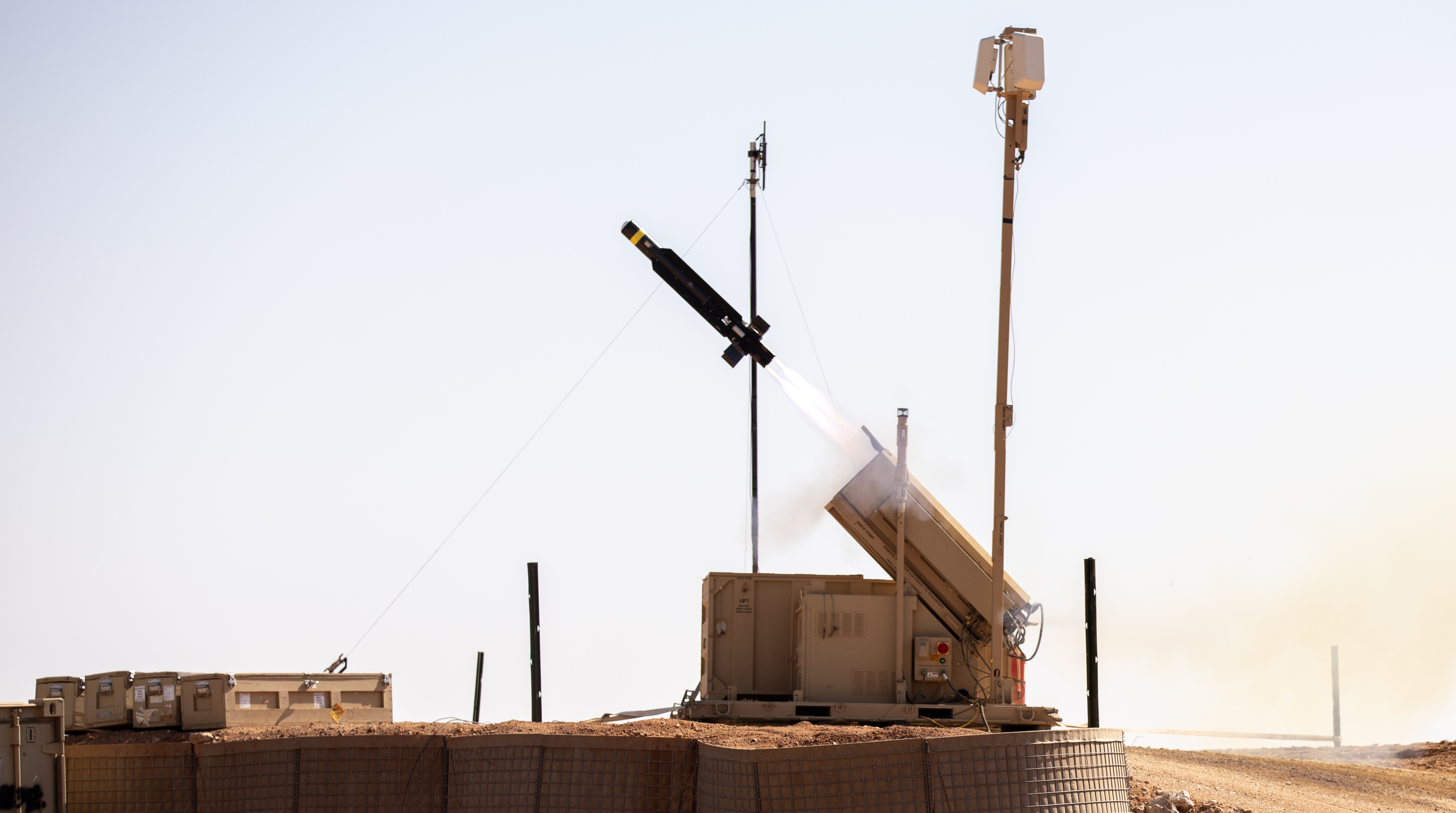
- Coyote UAS on test flight in 2016

General information
- Type: Small, expendable unmanned aerial vehicle, Loitering Munition, Interceptor drone
- National origin: United States
- Manufacturer: Raytheon Company; Raytheon Technologies
- Status: Operational
- Primary users: U.S. Army National Oceanographic and Atmospheric Administration (former)
- Service: U.S Army, U.S. Navy, U.S. Marine Corps

History
- Introduction date: 2014

The Raytheon Coyote is a small, expendable, unmanned aircraft system and counter drone interceptor built by RTX (formerly the Raytheon Company), with the capability of operating in autonomous swarms.

The system is in its third generation, and it has been used by the National Oceanic and Atmospheric Administration (NOAA), the United States Navy, and Army as an intelligence, surveillance, and reconnaissance asset, as well as for delivering explosives and counter drone attacks.

== Design and development ==
Advanced Ceramic Research of Tucson, Arizona, originally developed the Coyote, Manta and Silver Fox UAS under small business contracts from the U.S. Office of Naval Research. British defense contractor BAE Systems acquired the company in 2009, then sold it back to one of the former owners under the name Sensintel. Raytheon acquired Sensintel in 2015 and folded the company into its Tucson-based Raytheon Missiles & Defense business.

The Coyote first flew in 2007 while still under ACR development, being launched from a Beechcraft C-12 Huron.

This first generation was developed to meet specification from the Office of Naval Research for a drone that could be deployed using standard sonabouy launchers. It had folding wings so it could fit in the launch tube, carried a 0.9kg payload and was propeller driven. NOAA became involved as an additional customer and developed a sensor package for the drone to collect weather data.

After being acquired by Raytheon the radio data links were significantly upgraded in 2016 improving its abilities to collect weather data. Raytheon also used the platform for its entry in the ONRs Low-Cost UAV Swarming Technology (LOCUST) program and it was determined that multiple Coyotes could communicate with each other to function as an autonomous swarm. This corresponded with NOAA's funding for the Coyote coming to an end and represent the transition of the platform from atmospheric data collection to combat applications.

=== C-UAS ===
Starting in 2016 Raytheon worked with the U.S. Army to develop a new version of the Coyote with a counter unmanned air system (C-UAS) capability to intercept other small UAVs. The first generation of Coyote Anti-UAS was similar in size to the original model developed for the Navy but could hold a 1.8kg payload and was deployed from a pneumatic box launcher. It had a maximum speed of 81 mph (130 km/h). It weighs 13 lb (5.9 kg) and delivers a kinetic effect by crashing into enemy drones or exploding near them and dispersing blast fragments from its 4 lb (1.8 kg) warhead.

By 2018, the U.S. Marine Corps was using the Coyote Block 1 as part of their Ground-Based Air Defense (GBAD) Counter-UAS system which pair it with the RPS-42 S-band radar, the Modi electronic warfare system, and visual sensors to detect, track and destroy hostile drones. The system can operate out of a forward operating base or from vehicles such as an M-ATV or a pair of MRZR off-road vehicles.

In July 2018, Raytheon announced the Army had awarded it a contract to deliver the Coyote for C-UAS missions, with deliveries starting by the end of the year. The Coyote Block 1B is equipped with a radio-frequency seeker and proximity warhead working in conjunction with Raytheon’s Ku band radio frequency system (KuRFS) radar to intercept Class I and II drones; the KuRFS can detect Class I UAS out to 9.9 mi (16 km) and can even detect objects as small as a 9 mm bullet. In June 2019, the Coyote-KRFS radar system, dubbed Howler C-UAS, achieved Initial Operational Capability with the U.S. Army after just 17 months of development.

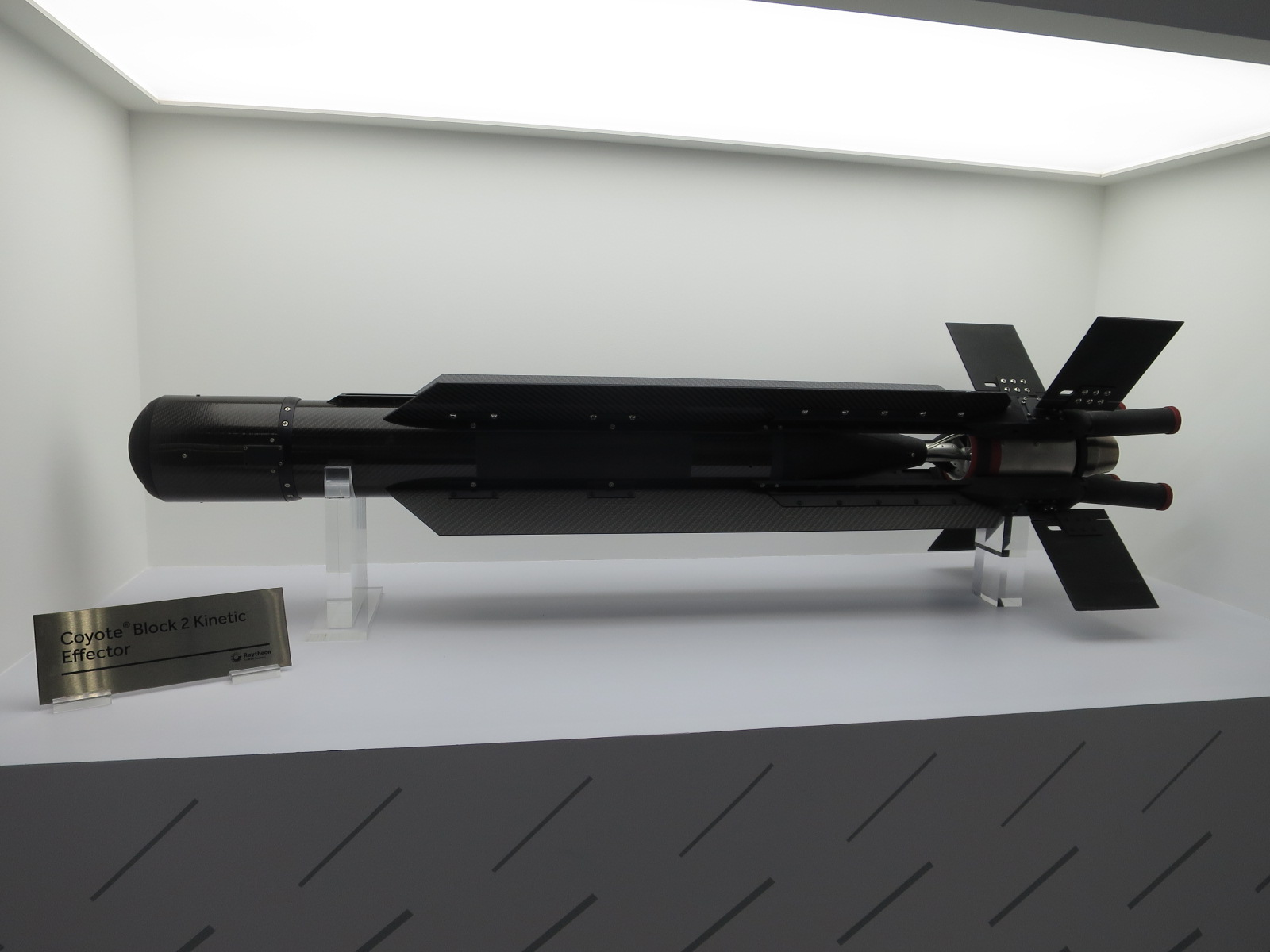
Raytheon Coyote Block 2

Raytheon then developed a Block 2 variant equipped with a jet engine, improving speed and loiter time to engage larger and further targets. The Coyote Block 2 features improved sensors and a turbine engine to increase speed to 345–370 mph (555–595 km/h). On 17 March 2020, Raytheon was cleared to sell the Coyote Block 2 interceptor as part of the Howler system after entering U.S. military service. Leveraging commercial off-the-shelf components, the interceptor is cheap enough to be used against large drone swarms. Four control fins pop out around the tail to make it maneuverable enough to close in on evading targets. It is fitted with a warhead producing a fragment field of small, fast-moving shrapnel optimized to destroy small drones. Using a rocket booster with a turbine sustainment motor, it can engage threats at ranges of 10–15 km (6.2–9.3 mi), and can even re-attack if it misses on the first pass. It has a loitering with re-engagement capability and is able to remain airborne for up to four minutes.

In November 2022, the U.S. approved the sale of 10 Fixed Site-Low, Slow, Small UAV Integrated Defeat Systems (FS-LIDS) to Qatar in a $1 billion deal. A system includes the AN/TPQ-50 counterfire radar and electro-optic cameras to detect and track small UAVs and engages them with EW or interceptors; the sale includes 200 Coyote Block 2s.

In January 2024 Raytheon was awarded a US$75 million U.S. Army contract to produce 600 Coyote 2C Interceptors for C-UAS use.

==== Block 3/Coyote LE SR ====
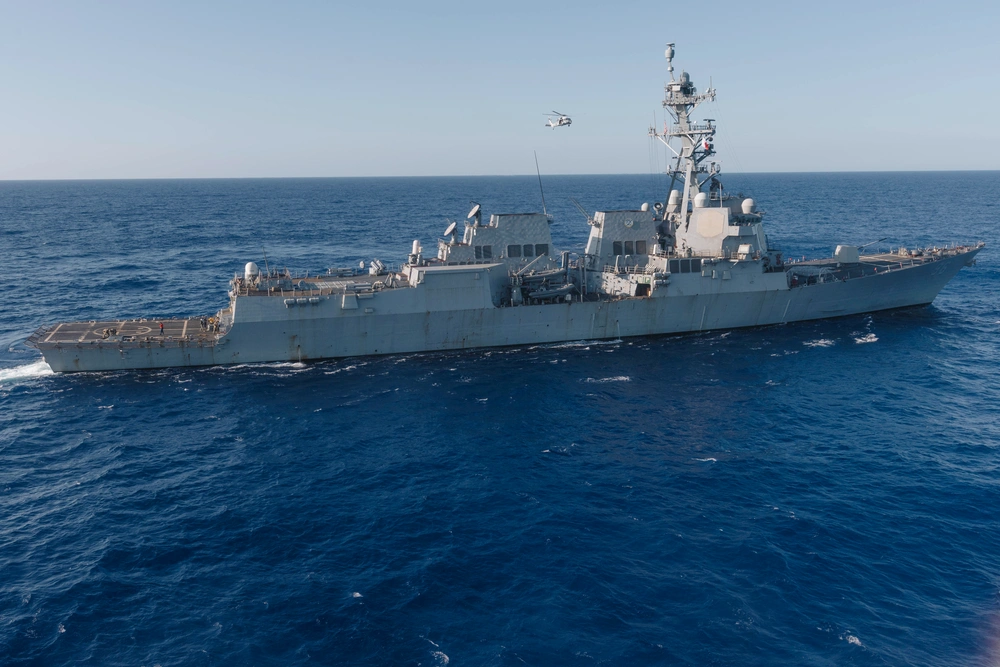
USS Bainbridge equipped with the 2 x 4-cell Block 3/Coyote Launchers placed on the aft of the superstructure.

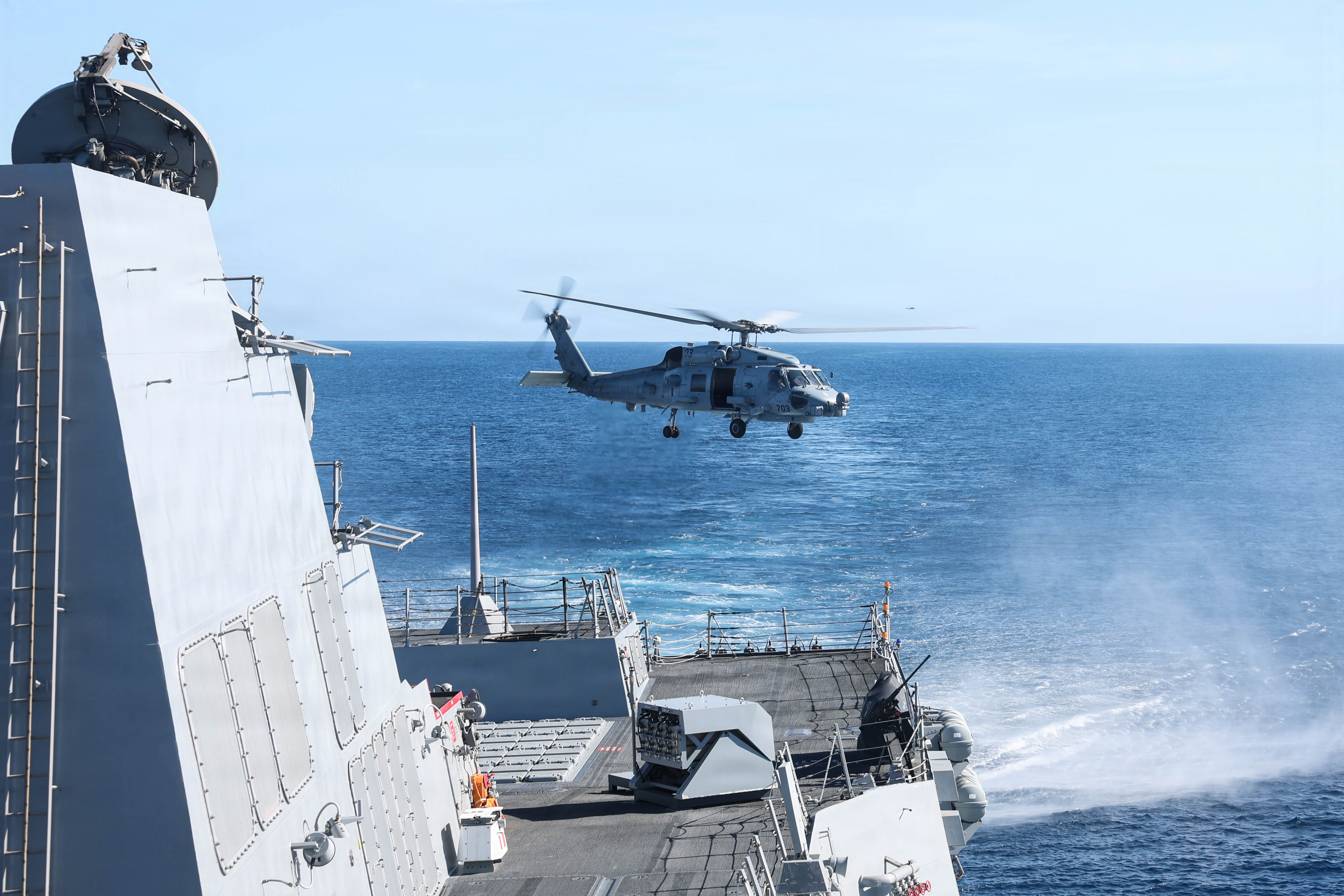
USS Carl M. Levin equipped with the 1 x 8-cell Block 3/Coyote Launchers placed on the aft of the superstructure between the port-side torpedo tubes and VLS launchers.

On 28 February 2021, Raytheon received a contract from the U.S. Navy for the Coyote Block 3 to provide an ISR and strike capability when launched from unmanned surface vehicles (USVs) and unmanned underwater vehicles (UUVs). Raytheon announced in August 2021 that a demonstration of the Block 3 in an air intercept test had used a non-kinetic warhead to defeat a swarm of 10 drones. This type of payload reduces potential collateral damage and enables the variant to be recovered and reused. The Block 3 Coyote was originally intended to have a more traditional UAV design with wings and an electric motor similar to the original Coyote Block 1, but bigger in size. By 2025 Coyote Block 3 had been renamed Coyote Launched Effect Short Range (Coyote LE SR), initially referred to by the Army only as a "670".

In March 2025, RTX successfully test-fired a Coyote LE SR from an unmodified M2 Bradley Fighting Vehicle's TOW missile launcher, as well as from a Modular Effects Launcher rack mounted on a Bell 407 helicopter in a separate test. Compared to the original Coyote Block 3 design, the TOW-launched version had been redesigned without visible wings or strakes, instead featuring new triple pop-out grid fins at the rear and no other visible control surfaces. Dropping any mentions of the Coyote Block 3's anti-air capabilities, the Coyote LE SR is marketed as a multi-launch platform, recoverable, reusable system that can be configured for surveillance and reconnaissance, electronic warfare, signal relay, or as a one-way munition in the form of a suicide drone.

In June 2025, during the deployment of the USS Gerald R. Ford carrier strike group, the Arleigh Burke-class (Flight IIA) destroyers, USS Bainbridge and USS Winston S. Churchill, had both been pictured equipped with a pair of Block 3 Coyote launchers on the aft superstructure on both ships.

On April 8, 2026, USS Carl M. Levin was seen in the Pacific Ocean with a new unknown launcher on her aft, between her port-side torpedo tubes and VLS launchers. Following the sighting, a U.S. Navy spokesperson revealed the launcher was an upgraded version of the Block 3/Coyote LE SR launcher previously seen on the Bainbridge and Winston S. Churchill. The Coyote launcher design had received four more cells, totaling to eight cells.

== Operational history ==
The original Coyote weather drone was used by NOAA starting with Hurricane Edouardo in the 2014 Atlantic Hurricane Season until funding for it ran out after the 2017 hurricane season. It was deployed by P-3 Hurricane Hunter aircraft, to collect data on atmospheric air pressure, temperature, moisture, wind speed and direction as well as surface temperature. Its role was to collect data at altitudes too low for manned aircraft to safely navigate in the hurricane environment.

In December 2023, the U.S. Army disclosed plans to purchase 6,700 Coyote interceptors from 2025-2029 for the Mobile-Low, Slow, Small Unmanned Aircraft Integrated Defeat System (M-LIDS) and FS-LIDS, as well as associated launch platforms and radars. 6,000 jet-powered radar-guided Coyote Blocks 2s will be procured costing an estimated $100,000 each, while 700 electric motor-driven pusher propeller Block 3s will be bought which uses an unspecified non-kinetic payload (likely an electronic warfare system or high-power directed energy weapon) which enables it to be recovered and refurbished for reuse. The M-LIDS configuration consists of one M-ATV with a turret with electro-optical sensors to spot and track incoming drones and armed with a two-round Coyote launcher and a 30 mm XM914 automatic cannon as well as a mast-mounted Ku-band radar, and a second M-ATV equipped with additional sensors and EW capabilities. The FS-LIDS is a palletized system, with one having a four-round Coyote launcher and sensor array, and the other with a larger and more capable Ku-band radar.

In July of 2026 Raytheon representatives said the Coyote C-UAS system is now in wide use and "has been significantly successful combating Class 1 through 3 drones" and that the U.S. Army was willing to disclose 600 successful combat intercepts by the Coyote system as part of Operation Epic Fury. Which is the first confirmed use of the system in an active combat setting.

== Specifications ==
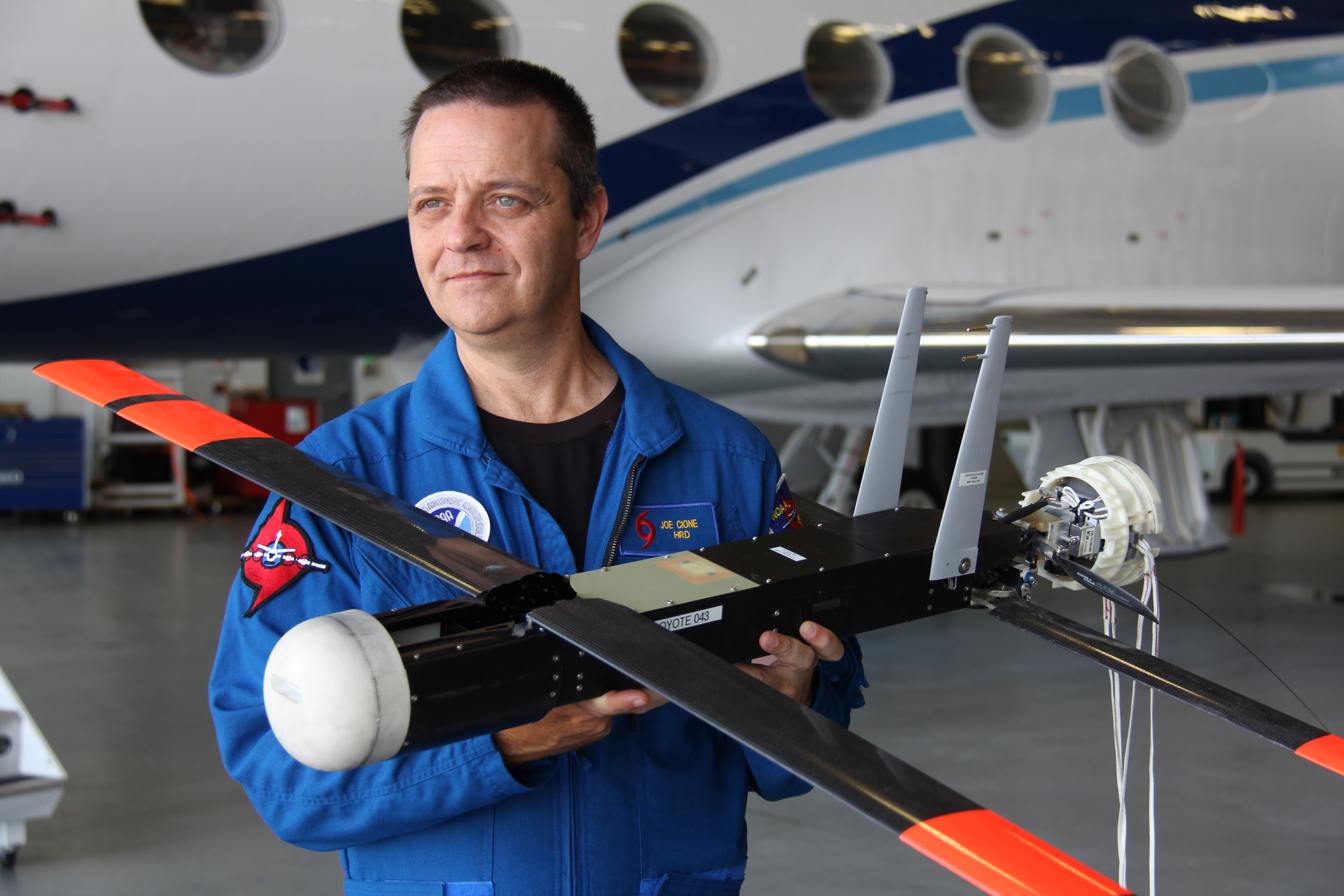
Joe Cione of NOAA with a Coyote

General characteristics Performance

- Airspeed: 55 knots (102 km/h) cruise, 70 knots (130 km/h) kts dash
- Deployment altitude: up to 30,000 feet (9,100 m) MSL (in non-icing conditions)
- Comms range: 50 nautical miles (93 km) (May 2016); 70 nautical miles (130 km) (ground test October 2016)
- Endurance: 1 hr+ @ cruise (May 2016); 2h (2017)
- Weight: 13 pounds (5.9 kg)
- Length: 36 inches (0.91 m)
- Wingspan: 58 inches (1.5 m)

== Operators ==
=== Current Operators ===
- United States

=== Future Operators ===
- UAE
