= HMS Raleigh =

Six ships and one shore establishment of the Royal Navy have borne the name HMS Raleigh, after Sir Walter Raleigh:

- HMS Raleigh was a 32-gun fifth rate, previously the American USS Raleigh (1776). She was captured in 1778 by HMS Unicorn and HMS Experiment and was commissioned into the Royal Navy as HMS Raleigh. She was sold in 1783.
- HMS Raleigh (1806) was an 18-gun Cruizer-class brig-sloop launched in 1806. She was used as a target from 1839 and was sold in 1841.
- HMS Raleigh (1845) was a 50-gun fourth rate launched in 1845 and wrecked in 1857, due to striking an uncharted rock near Hong Kong.
- HMS Raleigh was to have been a wood screw frigate. She was ordered in 1860, but was cancelled in 1863.
- HMS Raleigh (1873) was an iron screw frigate launched in 1874 and sold in 1905.
- HMS Raleigh (1919) was a Hawkins-class heavy cruiser launched in 1919 and wrecked in 1922.
- HMS Raleigh (shore establishment) is the current basic training establishment of the Royal Navy, in Torpoint.

== See also ==
- USS Raleigh
