= CSS Raleigh =

CSS Raleigh may refer to:

- CSS Raleigh (1861) was a gunboat that served as a tender to CSS Virginia during the Battle of Hampton Roads
- CSS Raleigh (1864) was an ironclad ram which patrolled the Cape Fear River near Wilmington, North Carolina

== See also ==
- USS Raleigh
