= USS Raleigh =

USS Raleigh may refer to:

- USS Raleigh (1776) was a 32-gun sailing frigate built in 1776 and captured by the British in 1778
- USS Raleigh (C-8) was a protected cruiser commissioned in 1894 and in periodic service until 1919
- USS Raleigh (CL-7) was a light cruiser commissioned in 1924, active during World War II and sold for scrap in 1946
- USS Raleigh (LPD-1) was an amphibious transport dock in service from 1962 to 1992

== See also ==
- SS Esso Raleigh
- CSS Raleigh
- HMS Raleigh
