= German destroyer Lütjens =

Steam turbine-powered ship

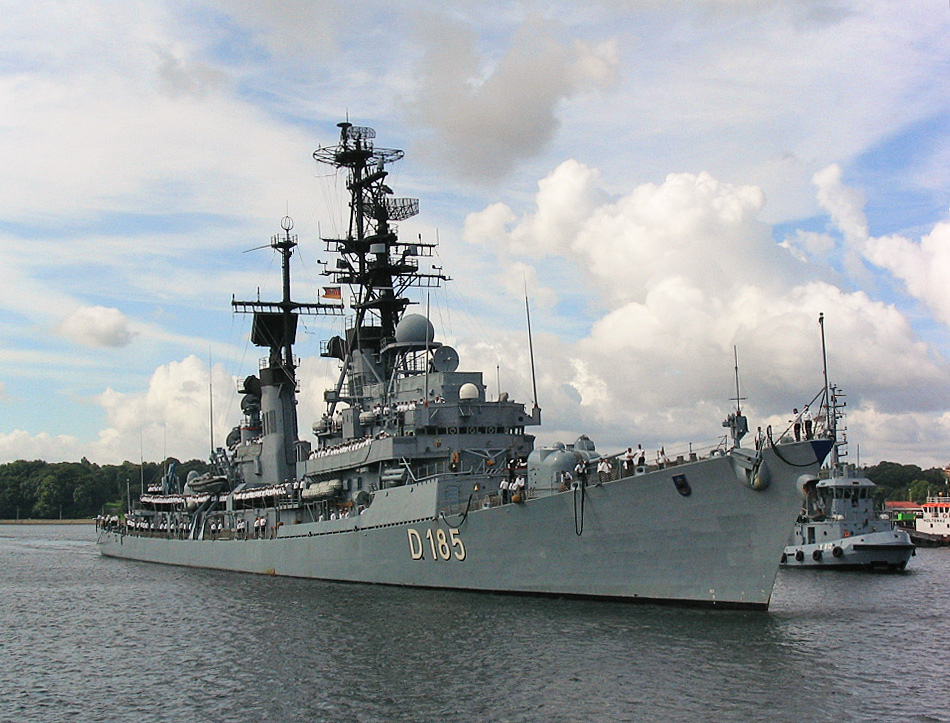
- Destroyer Lütjens 2003 in Kiel

History

Germany
- Name: Lütjens
- Namesake: Admiral Günther Lütjens
- Builder: Bath Iron Works
- Yard number: DDG-28
- Laid down: 1 March 1966
- Launched: 11 August 1967
- Commissioned: 22 March 1969
- Decommissioned: 18 December 2003
- Home port: Kiel
- Identification: D185
- Fate: Scrapped in Turkey, August 2012

General characteristics
- Class & type: Lütjens-class destroyer
- Displacement: 4720 t
- Length: 133.2 m (437 ft)
- Beam: 14.3 m (47 ft)
- Draft: 6.1 m (20 ft)
- Propulsion: 2 × steam turbines providing 70,000 shp (52 MW); 2 shafts; 4 × 1,275 psi (8,790 kPa) boilers
- Speed: 33 knots (61 km/h; 38 mph)
- Range: 4,500 nautical miles (8,300 km) at 20 knots (37 km/h; 23 mph)
- Complement: 337
- Sensors & processing systems: AN/SPS-40 2D air surveillance and early-warning radar, long-range; AN/SPS-67 sea surveillance radar, med-range; AN/SPS-52 3D air surveillance radar, long-range; 2 × AN/SPG-51C Mk 74 fire-control radar; AN/SPQ-9 short range fire-control radar for surface and low flying targets; AN/SPG-60 tracking and fire control radar (also radar illumination for the missiles); Raytheon RP 1225 navigation radar; Atlas Elektronik DSQS-21B active/passive sonar; EADS FL1800 ESM suite
- Electronic warfare & decoys: 2 × Mark 36 SRBOC 6 cell chaff and flare launcher; 1 × SLQ-25 Nixie torpedo decoy; 1 × EADS FL1800 ESM/ECM suite
- Armament: 2 × 127 mm/54 Mk 42 mod 10 guns; 2 × Rheinmetall Rh202 20 mm autocannons; 1 × Modified Mk 13 missile launcher; SM-1MR surface-to-air missile (usually 32); Harpoon anti-ship missile (usually 8); 2 × Mk 49 launcher, 21 RAM surface-to-air missiles each; 6 × 324 mm torpedo tubes, DM4A1 and Mark 46 torpedoes; 1 × ASROC launcher, 8 cell

The German destroyer Lütjens (German pronunciation: [ˈlʏtjəns]) was the lead ship of her class, a modified version of the American Charles F. Adams class, built for the Bundesmarine (West German Navy) during the 1960s.

== Design and description ==
The Charles F. Adams class was based on a stretched Forrest Sherman-class destroyer hull modified to accommodate an RUR-5 ASROC Launcher and all their associated equipment. The ships had an overall length of 134.4 meters (440 ft 11 in), a beam of 14.4 meters (47 ft 3 in) and a deep draft of 4.5 meters (14 ft 9 in). They displaced 4,526 metric tons (4,455 long tons) at full load. Their crew consisted of 333 officers and enlisted men.

The ships were equipped with two geared General Electric steam turbines, each driving one propeller shaft, using steam provided by four D-V2M water-tube boilers. The turbines were intended to produce 70,000 shaft horsepower (52,000 kW) to reach the designed speed of 36 knots (67 km/h; 41 mph). The Lütjens class had a range of 4,500 nautical miles (8,300 km; 5,200 mi) at a speed of 20 knots (37 km/h; 23 mph). Unlike their half-sisters, the ships had two macks.

They were armed with two 5"/54 caliber Mark 42 gun forward, one each forward and aft of the superstructure. The ships were fitted with an eight-round ASROC launcher between the funnels. Close-range anti-submarine defense was provided by two triple sets of 324-millimetre (12.75 in) Mk 32 torpedo tubes. The primary armament of the ships was the Tartar surface-to-air missile designed to defend the carrier battle group. They were fired via the single-arm Mk 13 missile launcher and the ships stowed a total of 40 missiles for the launcher.

== Construction and career ==
The ship was named for Admiral Günther Lütjens, who commanded a battlegroup comprising the Bismarck and the cruiser Prinz Eugen during Operation Rheinübung (Exercise Rhine). Lütjens was killed when Bismarck was surrounded by overwhelming British naval force on 27 May 1941 in the North Atlantic. She was laid down at Bath Iron Works in Bath, Maine on 1 March 1966 with the hull classification symbol DDG-28. She was launched on 11 August 1967 and commissioned on 22 March 1969.

On 14 September 2001, three days after the terrorist attacks on 11 September, the crew of Lütjens manned the rails, and as they approached the destroyers USS Winston S. Churchill and USS Gonzalez, they displayed an American flag and a banner reading "We Stand By You."

After over 30 years of service and a travelled distance of 800,000 nautical miles (1,500,000 km) Lütjens was decommissioned on 18 December 2003. She was the last steam-powered vessel and the last ship classified as a destroyer of the German Navy.

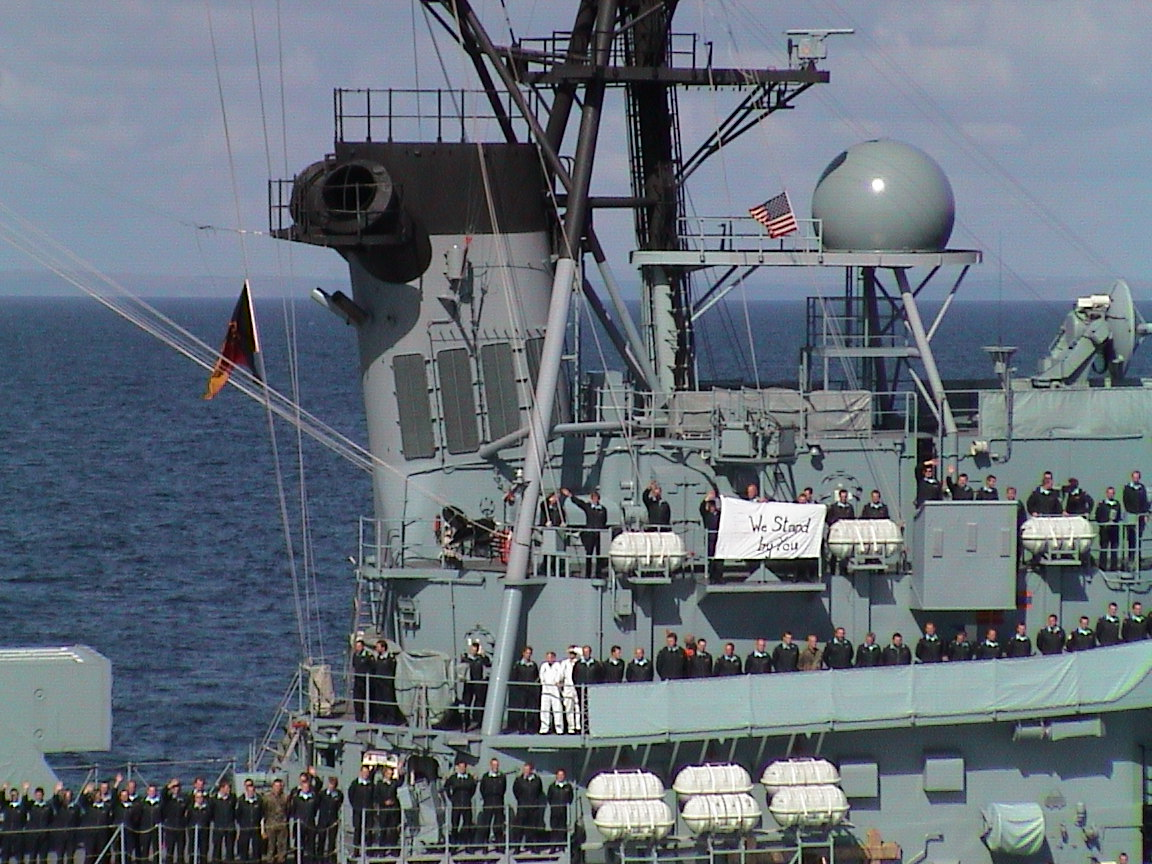
Lütjens rendering honours to USS Winston S. Churchill after the 11 September attacks
