= Russian submarine Novosibirsk (K-573) =

Yasen-class nuclear-powered cruise missile submarine of the Russian Navy

- Yasen class SSGN profile

History

Russia
- Name: K-573 Novosibirsk
- Namesake: Novosibirsk
- Builder: Sevmash
- Laid down: 26 July 2013
- Launched: 31 March 2017
- Commissioned: 21 December 2021
- Home port: Vilyuchinsk
- Status: In service

General characteristics
- Class & type: Yasen-class submarine
- Displacement: 8,600 t (8,500 long tons) surfaced; 13,800 t (13,600 long tons) submerged
- Length: 130 m (426 ft 6 in)
- Beam: 13 m (42 ft 8 in)
- Installed power: 1 × nuclear reactor
- Propulsion: 1 × steam turbine; 1 × shaft
- Speed: 16 kn (30 km/h; 18 mph) surfaced; 31 kn (57 km/h; 36 mph) submerged
- Complement: 64 officers and sailors
- Armament: 8 × missile silos; 10 × 533 mm (21 in) torpedo tubes

K-573 Novosibirsk is a Yasen-class nuclear-powered attack submarine of the Russian Navy. It is the second boat of the project Yasen-M. Considerable changes were made to the initial Yasen design. Differences in the project have appeared sufficient to consider it as a new upgraded version Yasen-M (Russian: Ясень-М). The submarine is named after the city of Novosibirsk.

== Design ==
The Project 885 Yasen class submarines are fourth-generation nuclear-powered cruise missile submarines. They were designed by the Malakhit Marine Engineering Bureau to replace the older Oscar class cruise missile submarines and the Akula class attack submarines, but their construction was delayed by the fall of the Soviet Union. The delays led to the creation of the 885M Yasen-M variant, a development of the lead ship of the class, Severodvinsk, with several upgrades. Among the differences of the Yasen-M is that they are powered by a fourth-generation monoblock nuclear reactor, which does not require a separate steam turbine, making it more compact and increasing the stealth of the submarine. It also has a conformal array sonar instead of a spherical sonar suite that is typically used on Russian submarines, including Severodvinsk.

The Yasen-class is equipped with eight missile silos that each have several vertical launching systems, allowing it to carry up to 32 Oniks anti-ship missiles or up to 40 Kalibr cruise missiles. It also has the ability to carry the hypersonic Zircon missile. The submarine's armament also includes ten 533 mm (21 in) torpedo tubes, which can be used to launch either UGST-M torpedoes or cruise missiles. For countermeasures, it has six 324 mm (13 in) torpedo launchers to fire lightweight torpedoes that serve as decoys.

The submarine has a surface displacement of 8,600 tonnes (8,500 long tons) and a submerged displacement of 13,800 tonnes (13,600 long tons). It has a length of 130 metres (426 ft 6 in) and a beam of 13 metres (42 ft 8 in). The Yasen-M has a crew of 64 officers and sailors, a reduction from the lead ship of the class. It has a surface top speed of 16 kn (30 km/h; 18 mph) and a submerged top speed of 31 kn (57 km/h; 36 mph). Its maximum rated depth is reported to be 658 m (2,158 ft 10 in).

== History ==
On 21 August 2014, the vessel completed hydraulic pressure hull tests as part of its construction process.

On 25 December 2019, Novosibirsk was rolled out of the construction hall and subsequently launched on the water. It began its sea trials on 1 July 2021 and was projected to join the Pacific Fleet of the Russian Navy in 4th Quarter 2021.

On 21 December 2021, Novosibirsk was commissioned along with Knyaz Oleg into the Pacific Fleet. Russian President Vladimir Putin attended the ceremony via a video call.

On 19 September 2022, Novosibirsk and the submarine Omsk respectively launched P-800 Oniks (SS-N-26 Strobile) and P-700 Granit (SS-N-19 Shipwreck) cruise missiles against seaborne targets in the Chukchi Sea. On 29 September, the submarine arrived to Petropavlovsk-Kamchatsky.

In 2026, the submarine was reported to fired both Onyx and Kalibr cruise missiles on exercises in the Pacific.
