= Russian submarine Arkhangelsk (K-564) =

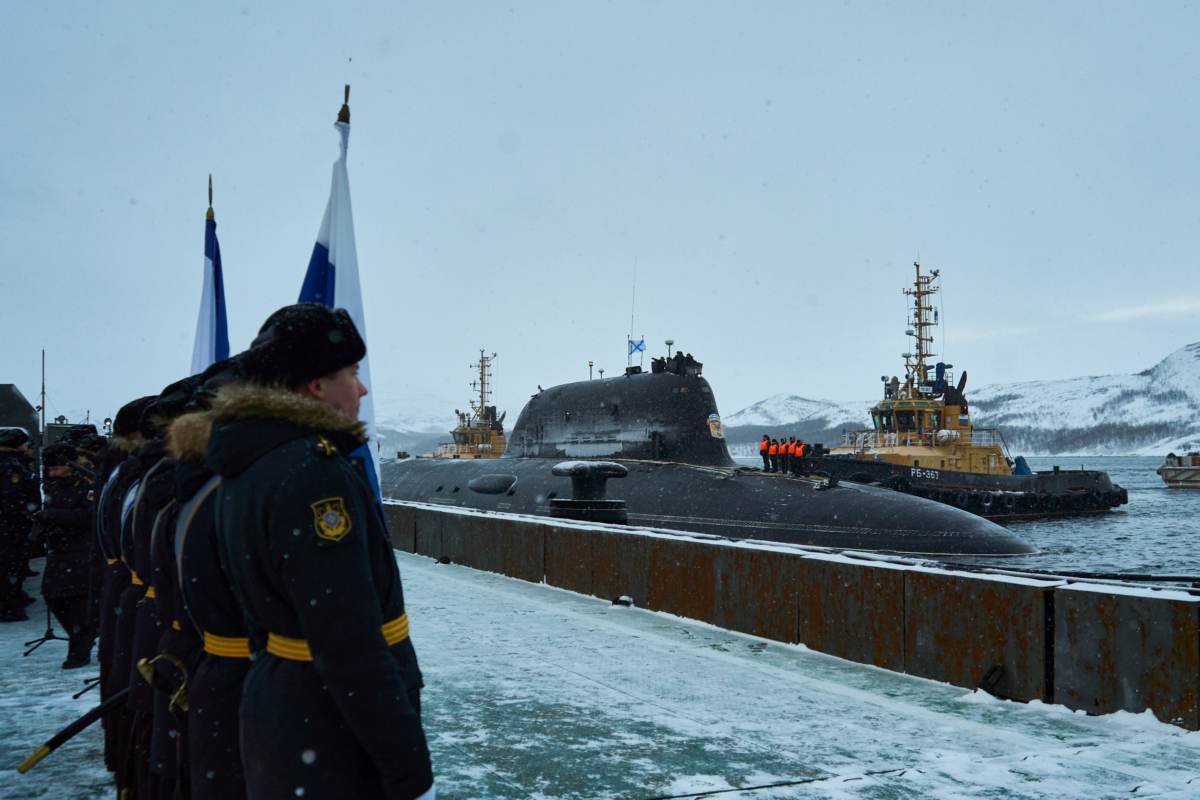
- Arkhangelsk in 2025

History

Russia
- Name: Arkhangelsk
- Namesake: Arkhangelsk
- Builder: Sevmash
- Laid down: 19 March 2015
- Launched: 29 November 2023
- Commissioned: 27 December 2024

General characteristics
- Class & type: Yasen-class submarine
- Displacement: 8,600 t (8,500 long tons) surfaced; 13,800 t (13,600 long tons) submerged
- Length: 130 m (426 ft 6 in)
- Beam: 13 m (42 ft 8 in)
- Installed power: 1 × nuclear reactor
- Propulsion: 1 × steam turbine; 1 × shaft
- Speed: 16 kn (30 km/h; 18 mph) surfaced; 31 kn (57 km/h; 36 mph) submerged
- Complement: 64 officers and sailors
- Armament: 8 × missile silos; 10 × 533 mm (21 in) torpedo tubes

Arkhangelsk (K-564, Russian: К-564 «Архангельск») is a Project 885M Yasen-class nuclear-powered cruise missile submarine of the Russian Navy. Arkhangelsk was laid down on 19 March 2015 at the Sevmash shipyard in Severodvinsk, launched on 29 November 2023, and commissioned on 27 December 2024. Since 27 January 2025 it has been assigned to the Northern Fleet and stationed at the Zapadnaya Litsa naval base.

== Design ==
The Project 885 Yasen class submarines are fourth-generation nuclear-powered cruise missile submarines. They were designed by the Malakhit Marine Engineering Bureau to replace the older Oscar class cruise missile submarines and the Akula class attack submarines, but their construction was delayed by the fall of the Soviet Union. The delays led to the creation of the 885M Yasen-M variant, a development of the lead ship of the class, Severodvinsk, with several upgrades. Among the differences of the Yasen-M is that they are powered by a fourth-generation monoblock nuclear reactor, which does not require a separate steam turbine, making it more compact and increasing the stealth of the submarine. It also has a conformal array sonar instead of a spherical sonar suite that is typically used on Russian submarines, including Severodvinsk.

The Yasen-class is equipped with eight missile silos that each have several vertical launching systems, allowing it to carry up to 32 Oniks anti-ship missiles or up to 40 Kalibr cruise missiles. It also has the ability to carry the hypersonic Zircon missile. The submarine's armament also includes ten 533 mm (21 in) torpedo tubes, which can be used to launch either UGST-M torpedoes or cruise missiles. For countermeasures, it has six 324 mm (13 in) torpedo launchers to fire lightweight torpedoes that serve as decoys.

The submarine has a surface displacement of 8,600 tonnes (8,500 long tons) and a submerged displacement of 13,800 tonnes (13,600 long tons). It has a length of 130 metres (426 ft 6 in) and a beam of 13 metres (42 ft 8 in). The Yasen-M has a crew of 64 officers and sailors, a reduction from the lead ship of the class. It has a surface top speed of 16 kn (30 km/h; 18 mph) and a submerged top speed of 31 kn (57 km/h; 36 mph). Its maximum rated depth is reported to be 658 m (2,158 ft 10 in).

== History ==
Arkhangelsk is the fourth Yasen-M and the fifth Yasen-class submarine overall. It was laid down on 19 March 2015 at the Sevmash shipyard in Severodvinsk and launched on 29 November 2023. After thirteen months of sea trials, Arkhangelsk was commissioned on 27 December 2024, with Captain 1st rank Aleksandr Gladkov in command. It is the third submarine in the Russian Navy to receive the name Arkhangelsk, after the Oscar class K-525 and the Typhoon class TK-17.

The submarine left Severodvinsk and arrived at the Zapadnaya Litsa naval base on the Kola Peninsula on 27 January 2025, where it will be permanently stationed.

On 27 March 2025, Russian President Vladimir Putin toured Arkhangelsk and met with members of the crew, along with the commander-in-chief of the Russian Navy, Admiral Aleksandr Moiseyev.

Arkhangelsk carried out a missile test in the waters north of its base on 19 May 2025, launching a cruise missile at the Chizha test range in northern Russia, about 500 km (310 mi) away. It was the first missile launch test since the submarine entered service. A further launch exercise took place in Spring 2026.
