= Russian submarine Ulyanovsk =

Russian Yasen-class nuclear submarine

- Yasen-M-class SSN profile

History

Russia
- Name: Ulyanovsk (Yasen-M class)
- Namesake: Ulyanovsk
- Builder: Sevmash
- Laid down: 28 July 2017
- Launched: 28 July 2026
- Commissioned: 2027 (planned)
- Status: Fitting out

General characteristics
- Type: Nuclear-powered attack submarine
- Displacement: Surfaced: 8,600 tons; Submerged: 13,800 tons
- Length: 130 m (430 ft)
- Beam: 13 m (43 ft)
- Propulsion: OK-650KPM pressurized water reactor 200 MWt turbines of 43,000 shp
- Speed: Surfaced: 15 kn (28 km/h; 17 mph); Submerged (silent): 20–28 kn (37–52 km/h; 23–32 mph) (Note: The reported numbers 20 kn and 28 kn are for the preceding subclass, the Yasen-class, see Yasen-class submarine. As there are no sources stating a Yasen-M silent speed, data from the previous class is used here); Submerged (max): 30–35 kn (56–65 km/h; 35–40 mph)
- Range: Unlimited
- Endurance: Only limited by food and maintenance requirements
- Test depth: up to 600 m (2,000 ft)
- Complement: 64
- Sensors & processing systems: MGK-600 Irtysh-Amfora spherical bow sonar; Flank and towed array sonar systems; MRK-50 Albatross (NATO reporting name: "Snoop Pair") Surface-search radar; Rim Hat electronic support/countermeasures system
- Armament: Eight missile silos each equipped with a 3S-14 VLS with each silo capable of carrying: 4 (32 total) Tsircon hypersonic cruise missiles; 4 (32 total) Oniks anti-ship cruise missiles; 5 (40 total) Kalibr anti-ship and land attack submarine-launched cruise missiles; 8 x torpedo tubes (533 mm) with up to 30 Futlyar (UGST-M) heavyweight torpedoes, Otvet anti-submarine missiles, and naval mines; Igla-M MANPADS surface-to-air missiles

K-563 Ulyanovsk is a Yasen-M class nuclear powered attack submarine . She was laid down on 28 July 2017 and was launched on 28 July 2026.

== Design ==
Ulyanovsk was designed by the Malakhit Marine Engineering Bureau

Ulyanovsk is the second submarine designed from its inception to carry the nuclear capable Tsirkon Hypersonic Missile.

The completion of Ulyanovsk is part of a larger modernization drive in the Russian Navy to replace older third-generation submarines, such as Akula or Sierra, with new Yasen/Yasen-M class submarines, which are quieter and carry more advanced technology that will phase out Soviet-era technology that is in use today.

== History ==
Ulyanovsk was laid down on 28 July 2017.

In January 2021, TASS rumored that Ulyanovsk would be a submarine of the Poseidon-carrying Khabarovsk class (project 09853), not of the Yasen-M (Project 885M) class.

In 2023, while construction on the submarine was ongoing, it was announced that, in accordance with traditions, some members of the crew would be representatives of the Ulyanovsk Oblast.

In January of 2026, Russian news clarified that Ulyanovsk would be a submarine of the Yasen-M class, and that it would be assigned to the Northern Fleet after completion.

Ulyanovsk was launched on 28 July 2026.

As of July 2026, she is being fitted-out. After she is finished being fitted out, she will undergo a series of sea trials which are expected to be complete by December 2027. These sea trials include testing critical systems, like her weapon systems and navigation systems, and crew training. After her sea trials, she is expected to enter service with the Russian Navy's Northern Fleet.
