= Russian submarine Kazan (K-561) =

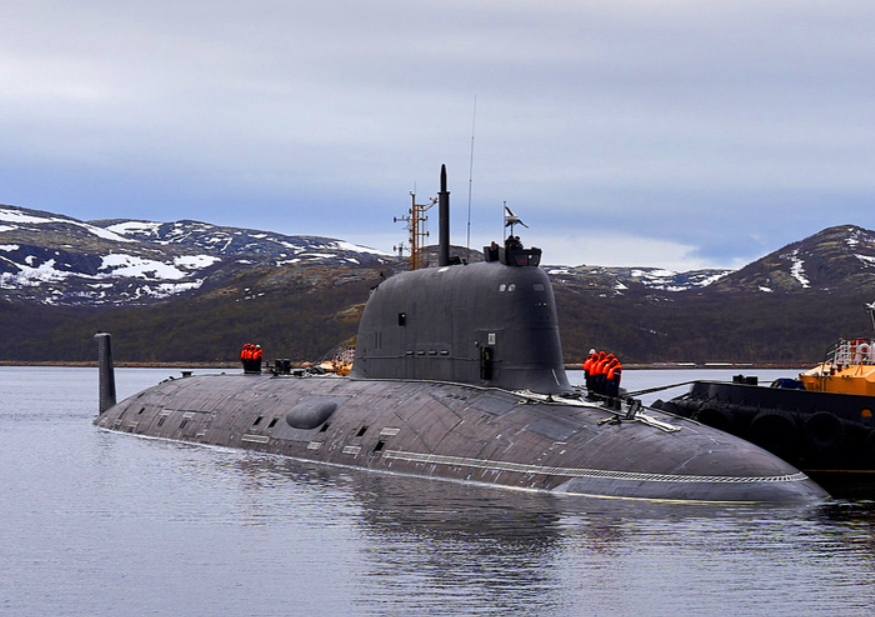
- Russian nuclear submarine, Kazan (K-561)

History

Russia
- Name: K-561 Kazan
- Namesake: Kazan
- Builder: Sevmash
- Laid down: 24 July 2009
- Launched: 31 March 2017
- Commissioned: 7 May 2021
- Status: Active

General characteristics
- Type: Nuclear-powered attack submarine
- Displacement: Surfaced: 8,600 tons; Submerged: 13,800 tons
- Length: 130 m (430 ft)
- Beam: 13 m (43 ft)
- Propulsion: OK-650KPM pressurized water reactor 200 MWt turbines of 43,000 shp
- Speed: Surfaced: 15 kn (28 km/h; 17 mph); Submerged (silent): 20–28 kn (37–52 km/h; 23–32 mph) (Note: The reported numbers 20 kn and 28 kn are for the preceding subclass, the Yasen-class, see [Yasen-class submarine#History); Submerged (max): 30–35 kn (56–65 km/h; 35–40 mph)
- Range: Unlimited
- Endurance: Only limited by food and maintenance requirements
- Test depth: up to 600 m (2,000 ft)
- Complement: 64
- Sensors & processing systems: MGK-600 Irtysh-Amfora spherical bow sonar; Flank and towed array sonar systems; MRK-50 Albatross (NATO reporting name: "Snoop Pair") Surface-search radar; Rim Hat electronic support/countermeasures system
- Armament: Eight missile silos each equipped with a 3S-14 VLS with each silo capable of carrying: 4 (32 total) Tsircon hypersonic cruise missiles; 4 (32 total) Oniks anti-ship cruise missiles; 5 (40 total) Kalibr anti-ship and land attack submarine-launched cruise missiles; 10 x torpedo tubes (533 mm) with up to 30 Futlyar (UGST-M) heavyweight torpedoes, Otvet anti-submarine missiles, and naval mines; Igla-M surface-to-air missiles

K-561 Kazan is a Yasen-class nuclear-powered attack submarine of the Russian Navy. It is the second boat of the project, separated from the first by 16 years (1993–2009). Considerable changes were made to the initial design. Differences in the project have appeared sufficient to consider it as a new upgraded version Yasen-M (Russian: Ясень-М). The submarine is named after the city of Kazan. The submarine is deployed with the Russian Northern Fleet.

== Design ==
The Project 885 Yasen class submarines are fourth-generation nuclear-powered cruise missile submarines. They were designed by the Malakhit Marine Engineering Bureau to replace the older Oscar class cruise missile submarines and the Akula class attack submarines, but their construction was delayed by the fall of the Soviet Union. The delays led to the creation of the 885M Yasen-M variant, a development of the lead ship of the class, Severodvinsk, with several upgrades. Among the differences of the Yasen-M is that they are powered by a fourth-generation monoblock nuclear reactor, which does not require a separate steam turbine, making it more compact and increasing the stealth of the submarine. It also has a conformal array sonar instead of a spherical sonar suite that is typically used on Russian submarines, including Severodvinsk.

The Yasen-class is equipped with eight missile silos that each have several vertical launching systems, allowing it to carry up to 32 Oniks anti-ship missiles or up to 40 Kalibr cruise missiles. It also has the ability to carry the hypersonic Zircon missile. The submarine's armament also includes ten 533 mm (21 in) torpedo tubes, which can be used to launch either UGST-M torpedoes or cruise missiles. For countermeasures, it has six 324 mm (13 in) torpedo launchers to fire lightweight torpedoes that serve as decoys.

The submarine has a surface displacement of 8,600 tonnes (8,500 long tons) and a submerged displacement of 13,800 tonnes (13,600 long tons). It has a length of 130 metres (426 ft 6 in) and a beam of 13 metres (42 ft 8 in). The Yasen-M has a crew of 64 officers and sailors, a reduction from the lead ship of the class. It has a surface top speed of 16 kn (30 km/h; 18 mph) and a submerged top speed of 31 kn (57 km/h; 36 mph). Its maximum rated depth is reported to be 658 m (2,158 ft 10 in).

== History ==
In June 2009 it was announced that the second Yasen-class submarine will receive the name Kazan and that its construction will begin the following month. Kazan's first crew had been formed in March 2016, and the submarine was originally to be commissioned in 2017. On 23 August 2016, the Sevmash shipyard reported that the submarine would be delivered to the Russian Navy in 2018.

On 31 March 2017, Kazan was rolled out of the construction hall and subsequently launched on the water. It began its sea trials on 24 September 2018 and was expected to join the Russian Navy in 2019. In October 2019, President of the United Shipbuilding Corporation Alexei Rakhmanov, stated that Kazan's deployment would be delayed until the end of 2020 due to technical issues with its complex control systems.

The submarine's trials included the firing of the 3M-54 Kalibr and P-800 Oniks cruise missiles. They were completed in December 2020.

As of April 2021, the commissioning date was reported to be 25 July 2021. However, the vessel was actually commissioned on 7 May 2021.

On 6 June 2024, it was reported that the nuclear powered submarine was heading to Cuba for military exercise. It made port in Havana Harbor on June 12 as part of group of four ships including the frigate Admiral Gorshkov. Both of these vessels carry the Zircon nuclear-capable hypersonic cruise missile. The frigate has been reported to be en route to the Mediterranean to be the command vessel of the operational group of the Russian Navy there.

The submarine was reported active on cruise missile tests as of 2026.
