= Russian submarine Krasnoyarsk (K-571) =

Russian submarine

- Yasen class SSGN profile

History

Russia
- Name: K-571 Krasnoyarsk
- Namesake: Krasnoyarsk
- Builder: Sevmash
- Laid down: 27 July 2014
- Launched: 30 July 2021
- Commissioned: 11 December 2023
- Status: In service

General characteristics
- Class & type: Yasen-class submarine
- Displacement: 8,600 t (8,500 long tons) surfaced; 13,800 t (13,600 long tons) submerged
- Length: 130 m (426 ft 6 in)
- Beam: 13 m (42 ft 8 in)
- Installed power: 1 × nuclear reactor
- Propulsion: 1 × steam turbine; 1 × shaft
- Speed: 16 kn (30 km/h; 18 mph) surfaced; 31 kn (57 km/h; 36 mph) submerged
- Complement: 64 officers and sailors
- Armament: 8 × missile silos; 10 × 533 mm (21 in) torpedo tubes

K-571 Krasnoyarsk is a Yasen-class nuclear-powered attack submarine of the Russian Navy. It is the third boat of the project Yasen-M. Considerable changes were made to the initial Yasen design. Differences in the project have appeared sufficient to consider it as a new upgraded version Yasen-M (Russian: Ясень-М). The submarine is named after the city of Krasnoyarsk.

== Design ==
The Project 885 Yasen class submarines are fourth-generation nuclear-powered cruise missile submarines. They were designed by the Malakhit Marine Engineering Bureau to replace the older Oscar class cruise missile submarines and the Akula class attack submarines, but their construction was delayed by the fall of the Soviet Union. The delays led to the creation of the 885M Yasen-M variant, a development of the lead ship of the class, Severodvinsk, with several upgrades. Among the differences of the Yasen-M is that they are powered by a fourth-generation monoblock nuclear reactor, which does not require a separate steam turbine, making it more compact and increasing the stealth of the submarine. It also has a conformal array sonar instead of a spherical sonar suite that is typically used on Russian submarines, including Severodvinsk.

The Yasen-class is equipped with eight missile silos that each have several vertical launching systems, allowing it to carry up to 32 Oniks anti-ship missiles or up to 40 Kalibr cruise missiles. It also has the ability to carry the hypersonic Zircon missile. The submarine's armament also includes ten 533 mm (21 in) torpedo tubes, which can be used to launch either UGST-M torpedoes or cruise missiles. For countermeasures, it has six 324 mm (13 in) torpedo launchers to fire lightweight torpedoes that serve as decoys.

The submarine has a surface displacement of 8,600 tonnes (8,500 long tons) and a submerged displacement of 13,800 tonnes (13,600 long tons). It has a length of 130 metres (426 ft 6 in) and a beam of 13 metres (42 ft 8 in). The Yasen-M has a crew of 64 officers and sailors, a reduction from the lead ship of the class. It has a surface top speed of 16 kn (30 km/h; 18 mph) and a submerged top speed of 31 kn (57 km/h; 36 mph). Its maximum rated depth is reported to be 658 m (2,158 ft 10 in).

== History ==
On 30 July 2021, Krasnoyarsk was rolled out of the construction hall and subsequently launched on the water. The submarine's future commander Captain 2nd Rank Ivan Artyushin traditionally smashed a bottle against the ship's board. In February 2022, Krasnoyarsk started the mooring trials. Sea trials started on 26 June. The submarine was expected to be commissioned in 2023. She reportedly launched cruise missiles during state tests in November 2023. She was entered service on 11 December 2023 and transferred to the Pacific Fleet (Russia) in September 2024.
