= Russian submarine Perm =

Yasen-class nuclear attack submarine

Perm is a nuclear attack submarine of the 4th generation of the Russian Navy. It is the sixth ship of Project 885. It is being built according to the modernized Project 885M (08851) Yassen-M. It is the second submarine named after the city of Perm, following the B-292 Perm of Project 671RTMK, which was in service from 2002 to 2005.

== History ==
The submarine was keel laid on July 29, 2016, at the shipyard of Sevmash, just before Navy Day, celebrated on July 31, 2016.

According to media reports, the nuclear submarine will be delivered to the Russian Navy in late 2025/early 2026. A source close to the Russian Ministry of Defense told TASS that the Perm was to undergo trials in late 2024 or early 2025 before entering service in the Navy in 2026. She in fact began sea trials in August 2025.

The nuclear submarine will be the first designed from the outset to be armed with the hypersonic cruise missile Zircon.
