= Laika-class submarine =

Series of Russian nuclear-powered submarines

Class overview
- Name: Laika class
- Builders: Sevmash
- Preceded by: Yasen class

General characteristics
- Type: SSN, Possible SSGN & SSBN capability
- Displacement: Submerged: 11,340 tons
- Installed power: Nuclear reactor
- Speed: 35 kn (65 km/h; 40 mph)
- Range: Unlimited
- Endurance: 90 days
- Test depth: 600 m (2,000 ft)
- Armament: 6 × 533 mm torpedo tubes; 3M-54 Kalibr, P-800 Oniks, 3M22 Tsircon anti-ship cruise missiles; Submarine-launched ballistic missiles; Igla-M surface-to-air missiles; Khishchnik, USET-80, Fizik-1, MTPK-1 torpedoes; PMR-2 anti-submarine mines; 81PU Otvet anti-submarine missiles

The Laika class, Russian designation Project 545 Laika (Russian: Лайка), also referred to as Husky class (Russian: Хаски, lit. 'husky'), are a series of nuclear-powered, modular, fifth-generation multi-purpose submarines currently under development by Malakhit Marine Engineering Bureau for the Russian Navy.

== History ==
On 16 December 2014, it became known Malakhit was developing a new fifth-generation nuclear submarine as an internal initiative. On 17 March 2016, the codename Husky was disclosed, and finally on 8 August 2016, a contract was signed with the Russian Defence Ministry for development of the submarine. In April 2018, Malakhit CEO Vladimir Dorofeyev reported the preliminary design of the prospective Husky class nuclear submarine was complete. A year later, in April 2019, Malakhit announced it had launched R&D work on the submarine under a new codename Laika.

On 24 December 2019, during the Russia's Defence Ministry Board session held in Moscow, project number and some technical characteristics of the submarine were revealed. The lead vessel of the class is expected to be built by 2027–2030.

== Design ==
The submarines are reported to combine the roles of multi-purpose and strategic submarines, being able to use both cruise and ballistic missiles depending on the task and modular configuration. The submarines will have a smaller displacement than the current fourth-generation Yasen-class submarines and incorporate the double hull design with the outer hull made of composite materials. The composites are also expected to be used for control surfaces and propulsion system.

The main armament is to include forward facing 533mm Torpedo Tubes (6 tubes estimated based on trade show models), 3M-54 Kalibr and P-800 Oniks anti-ship cruise missiles as well as the 3M22 Tsircon hypersonic cruise missiles. The vessels are also projected to be armed with MARVed ballistic missiles currently in development by the Makeyev Rocket Design Bureau. According to President of the United Shipbuilding Corporation Alexei Rakhmanov, the submarines are to be highly unified in their key components in order to substantially reduce the costs for the Russian Defence Ministry.

The Project 545 submarines reportedly feature the displacement of 11,340 tons, maximum speed of 35 knots, 90 days of autonomy and maximum submersion depth of 600 meters.
