= Yasen-class submarine =

Class of Russian nuclear-powered cruise missile submarine

Yasen class
- Yasen-class SSN profile

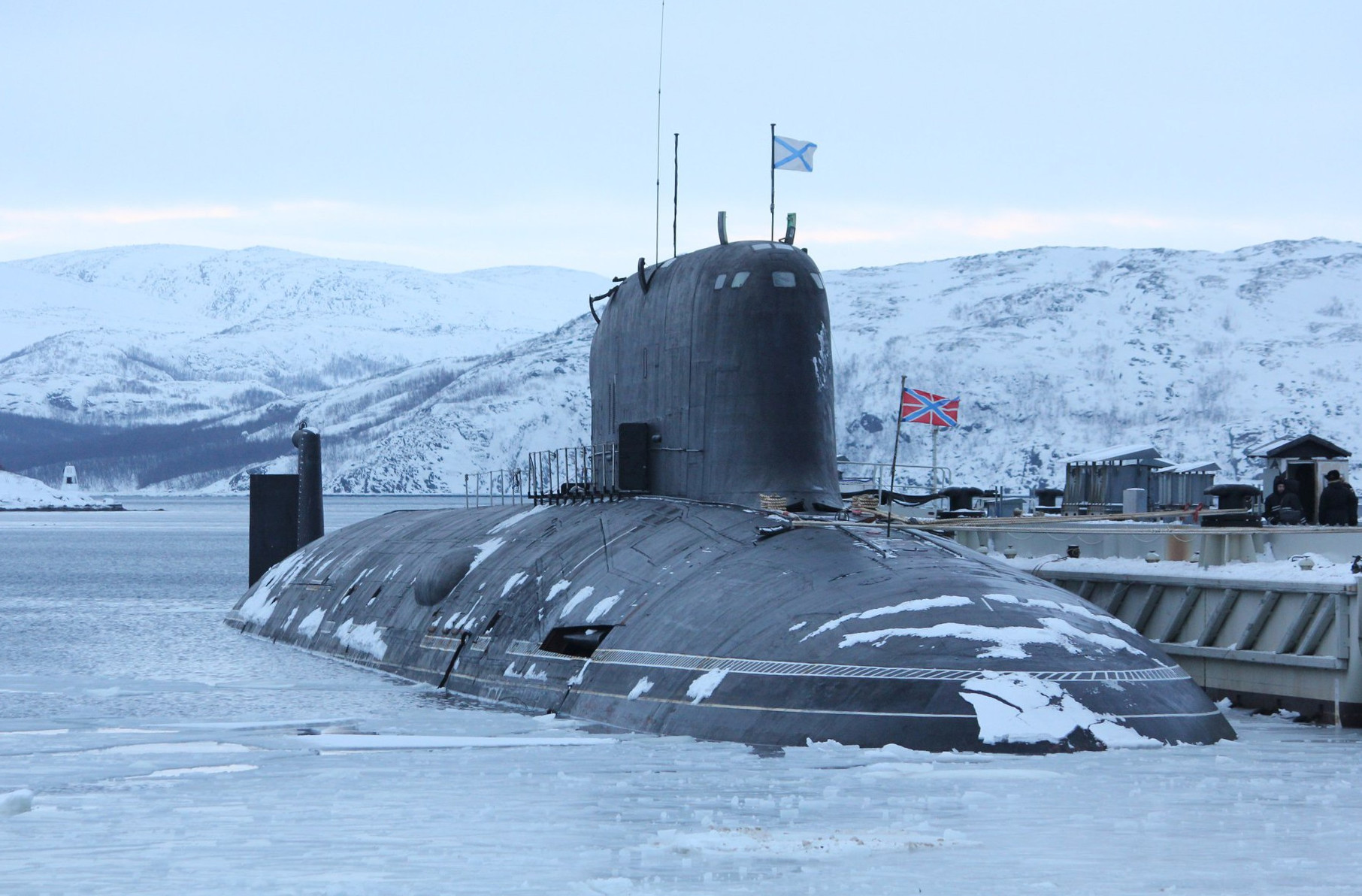
- K-560 Severodvinsk

Class overview
- Name: Yasen class
- Builders: Sevmash
- Operators: Russian Navy
- Preceded by: Oscar class; Akula class
- Succeeded by: Laika class
- Cost: RUB47 billion for Kazan (2011)
- Built: 1993–present
- In commission: 2013–present
- Planned: 12
- Building: 3
- Completed: 7 (One on sea trials, and one launched, being fitted out)
- Active: 5

General characteristics
- Type: Nuclear-powered attack submarine
- Displacement: Surfaced: 8,600 tons; Submerged: 13,800 tons
- Length: Yasen: 139.2 m (457 ft); Yasen-M: 130 m (430 ft)
- Beam: 13 m (43 ft)
- Propulsion: Yasen:OK-650V water-cooled, water-moderated reactor, 190 MWt; Yasen-M:OK-650KPM pressurized water reactor, 200 MWt turbines of 43,000 shp
- Speed: Yasen (Note: Information here is inconsistent. All data which has sources is included): Surfaced: 20 kn (37 km/h; 23 mph); Submerged (silent): 28 kn (52 km/h; 32 mph) or 20 kn (37 km/h; 23 mph); Submerged (max): 35 kn (65 km/h; 40 mph); Yasen-M: Surfaced: 15 kn (28 km/h; 17 mph); Submerged (silent): 20–28 kn (37–52 km/h; 23–32 mph) (Note: if consistent with original Yasen design); Submerged (max): 30–35 kn (56–65 km/h; 35–40 mph)
- Range: Unlimited
- Endurance: Only limited by food and maintenance requirements
- Test depth: Up to 600 m (2,000 ft)
- Complement: Yasen: 85; Yasen-M: 64
- Sensors & processing systems: MGK-600 Irtysh-Amfora spherical bow sonar; Flank and towed array sonar systems; MRK-50 Albatross (NATO reporting name: "Snoop Pair") Surface-search radar; Rim Hat electronic support/countermeasures system
- Armament: Yasen: and Yasen-M: Eight missile silos each equipped with a 3S-14 VLS with each silo capable of carrying: 4 (32 total) Tsircon hypersonic cruise missiles; 4 (32 total) Oniks anti-ship cruise missiles; 5 (40 total) Kalibr anti-ship and land attack submarine-launched cruise missiles; Igla-M surface-to-air missiles; Yasen: 10 x torpedo tubes (533 mm) with up to 30 Futlyar (UGST-M) heavyweight torpedoes, Otvet anti-submarine missiles, and naval mines; Yasen-M: 8 x torpedo tubes (533 mm) with up to 24 Futlyar (UGST-M) heavyweight torpedoes, Otvet anti-submarine missiles, and naval mines

The Yasen class, Russian designations Project 885 Yasen and Project 885M Yasen-M (Russian: Ясень, lit. 'ash tree', NATO reporting name: Severodvinsk), also referred to as the Graney class, are a series of nuclear-powered attack submarines (SSN) designed by the Malakhit Marine Engineering Bureau and built by Sevmash for the Russian Navy. Design work commenced in earnest in the 1980s with the first submarine built in the 1990s–early 2010s with commissioning in 2013. The first two boats to an upgraded (and slightly shorter overall) Yasen-M design were commissioned in 2021. Based on the Akula class and Alfa class designs, the Yasen class is projected to replace the Russian Navy's current Soviet-era nuclear attack submarines as well as Oscar II class cruise missile submarines. The multipurpose Yasen class concept uses the platform both for the hunter-killer role as well as to target enemies with the VLS-launched cruise missile, similar to the cruise missile submarine. All submarines of this class but Severodvinsk are of the upgraded Yasen-M class variant.

== History ==
The Yasen-class submarines were designed by Malakhit, which was formed through the late 1950s merger of the SKB-143 and TsKB-16 design bureaus. Work on the initial design was scheduled to start in 1977 and be completed in 1985. Malakhit is one of the three Soviet/Russian submarine design centers, along with Rubin Design Bureau and Lazurit Central Design Bureau.

"Yasen-M" variant profile

Construction on the first submarine started on 21 December 1993, with its launch slated for 1995 and its commissioning for 1998. However, the project was delayed due to financial problems and it appeared during 1996 that work on the submarine had stopped completely. Some reports suggested that as of 1999 the submarine was less than 10 percent complete. In 2003 the project received additional funding and the work of finishing the submarine restarted.

In 2004 it was reported that the work on the submarine was moving forward, but, due to the priority given to the new Borei-class SSBNs, the lead unit of the class (Severodvinsk) would not be ready before 2010. In July 2006 the deputy chairman of the Military-Industrial Commission, Vladislav Putilin, stated that two Yasen-class submarines were to join the Russian Navy before 2015.

On 24 July 2009, work commenced on a second submarine, named Kazan. On 26 July, the Russian navy command announced that starting in 2011, one multipurpose submarine would be laid down every year, although not necessarily of this class.

An August 2009 report from the U.S. Office of Naval Intelligence estimated the Yasen-class submarines to be the quietest, or least detectable, of seagoing Russian and Chinese nuclear submarines, but said they were still not as quiet as first-line U.S. Navy submarines (i.e. Seawolf and Virginia classes).

In April 2010, it was reported that the 7 May launch of the first boat had been postponed due to "technical reasons". Then, the launch of the first submarine and the beginning of sea trials were scheduled for September 2011.

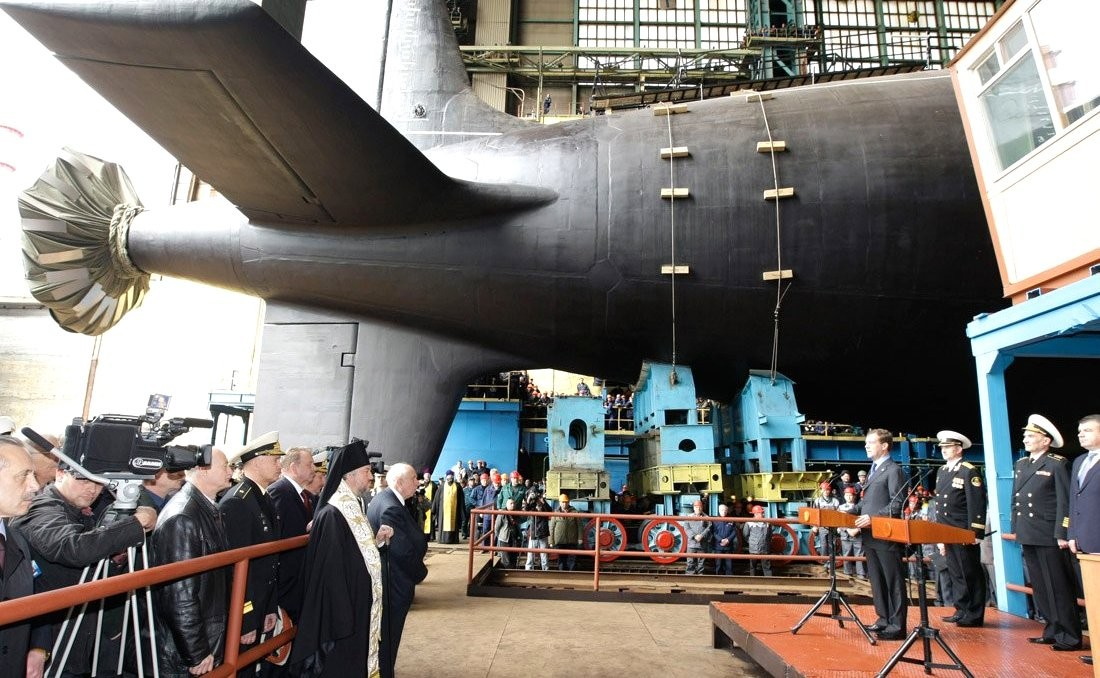
Roll out ceremony of Russian submarine Severodvinsk

On 26 July 2013 the third submarine, named Novosibirsk, was laid down.

On 30 December 2013, Severodvinsk was handed over to the Russian Navy. The flag-raising ceremony was held on 17 June 2014 marking its introduction into the Russian Navy.

In October 2014, one of the U.S. Navy's top submarine officers, Rear Admiral Dave Johnson, the Naval Sea Systems Command's program executive officer (PEO) for submarines, said "We'll be facing tough potential opponents. One only has to look at the Severodvinsk, Russia's version of a nuclear guided missile submarine (SSGN). I am so impressed with this ship that I had Carderock build a model from unclassified data".

According to 60 Minutes, unnamed Pentagon officials claimed that Severodvinsk on her maiden deployment "slipped into the Atlantic Ocean and for weeks evaded all of the attempts to find her" in the summer 2018.

Kazan was rumoured to be active, along with five other nuclear submarines, in the northern Atlantic in spring 2020. However, she may actually have been on sea trials since she was reported commissioned in May 2021.

On October 4, 2021, Severodvinsk performed two test launches of Zircon missile, from surfaced and underwater position. The launches were performed from the White Sea to the Barents Sea and were successful.

== Design ==
Cross sections

The vessel's design is said to be state-of-the-art. The Yasen-class nuclear submarines are presumed to be armed with land-attack cruise missiles, anti-ship missiles, anti-submarine missiles including the P-800 Oniks SLCM, Kalibr (including Otvet anti-submarine variant) family SLCM or 3M51 SLCM. Kalibr-PL has several variants including the 3M54K (terminal-supersonic) and 3M54K1 (subsonic) anti-ship, 91R1 anti-submarine, and the 3M14K land-attack variant. In the future, there will be also an option to install the hypersonic 3M22 Zircon cruise missiles on upgraded 885M boats. Each submarine can carry 32 Kalibr or 24 Oniks (other sources claim 40 Kalibr and 32 Oniks) cruise missiles which are stored in eight (ten for 885M) vertical launchers (additional missiles may be carried in the torpedo room at the expense of torpedoes). It will also have ten 533 mm tubes, as well as mines and anti-submarine missiles such as the RPK-7.

It is the first Russian submarine class to be equipped with a spherical sonar, designated as MGK-600 Irtysh-Amfora. The device (allegedly the Irtysh/Amfora sonar system) was tested on a modified Yankee-class submarine. The sonar system consists of a spherical bow array, flank arrays and a towed array. Due to the large size of this spherical array, the torpedo tubes are slanted. In other words, the torpedo tube outer doors are not located in the immediate bow as in the previous Akula class but moved aft. The hull is constructed from low-magnetic steel. Unlike previous Russian submarines which have a double hull, Yasen-class submarines mostly have a single hull. The Yasen class has a crew of 85 on project 885 and 64 on project 885M, suggesting a high degree of automation in the submarine's different systems. The newest U.S. Virginia-class submarines, has a crew of 134 in comparison.

Yasen-class submarines are the first to be equipped with a fourth-generation nuclear reactor. The reactor, built by Afrikantov OKBM, will allegedly have a 25-30-year core life and will not have to be refueled. Steam turbines are supplied by Kaluga Turbine Works. The inclusion of new generation KTP-6 reactor on the Yasen-M boats is thought to significantly reduce their noise level: the reactor's primary cooling loop facilitates natural circulation of water and thus doesn't require continuous operation of the main circulation pumps, which are the key noise factor on a nuclear submarine. A VSK rescue pod is carried in the sail. The first ship of the class came equipped with a traditional mast system but it may be replaced with the non-penetrating electro-optical masts meant for improved ISR capability, and reduced risk in collisions.

According to Admiral James Foggo, the commander of the US Naval Forces Europe, the Yasen class submarines are "very quiet, which is the most important thing in submarine warfare". It's claimed that Severodvinsk is far quieter than previous Russian SSNs, capable of 20 knots while running quiet, which is equal to the Seawolf class and inferior only to the Virginia class (25 knots). Other sources claim that Severodvinsk is capable of even 28 knots in silent mode.

== Costs ==
Initial estimates regarding the cost of the first Yasen-class submarine ranged from US$1 billion to US$2 billion. In 2011, it was reported that the cost of first-of-class, Severodvinsk, was 50 billion rubles (roughly US$1.6 billion) while the second unit, Kazan, will cost an estimated 47 billion rubles (US$725 million, in 2019 RUB/USD exchange rate). In 2011, then Defense Minister Anatoliy Serdyukov criticized the ever increasing cost of the Borei and Yasen classes. The Minister described the massive increase in cost between the first and the second Yasen-class submarine as "incomprehensible". However, he insisted that the Russian Defence Ministry and Sevmash would resolve the issue. Officials from the United Shipbuilding Corporation replied that work done in Sevmash accounts for only 30% of the submarine's completion cost, the remaining 70% being linked to suppliers/contractors.

== Successor/supplement ==
Due to the high cost of each Yasen class submarine, some sources believe that a next generation of SSNs would be of smaller dimensions with a reduced armament/payload could be built. The successor/supplement to the Yasen class was in early development by 2015 and dubbed "Husky class" by media. The final design of the submarine is yet to be completed and may feature a more conventional layout with bow-mounted torpedo tubes (as opposed to the midship torpedo tubes on Yasen class) and a smaller chin-mounted sonar, i.e. the sonar will be mounted below the torpedo tubes (as opposed to a large spherical sonar on Yasen class). The first submarine is expected to be delivered to the Russian Navy by 2027.

== Units ==
Italicized dates indicate estimates.

#	Name	Project	Laid down	Launched	Commissioned	Fleet	Status	Notes
K-560	Severodvinsk	885	21 Dec 1993	15 Jun 2010	17 Jun 2014	Northern	Active	Handed over to Northern Fleet for use 30 December 2013, flag raised on 17 July 2014. Later modified to carry Zircon missiles
K-561	Kazan	885M	24 Jul 2009	31 Mar 2017	5 May 2021	Northern	Active as of 2026	Acceptance act signed on 5 May 2021, ceremony held on 7 May 2021.
K-573	Novosibirsk	885M	26 Jul 2013	25 Dec 2019	21 Dec 2021	Pacific	Active as of 2026	
K-571	Krasnoyarsk	885M	27 Jul 2014	30 Jul 2021	11 Dec 2023	Pacific	Active	On 23 Jan 2017, it successfully completed hydraulic pressure hull tests. Mooring trials were underway in Feb 2022, with sea trials anticipated to begin in spring 2022. Sea trials started on 26 Jun 2022.
K-564	Arkhangelsk	885M	19 Mar 2015	29 Nov 2023	27 Dec 2024	Northern	Active as of 2026	Sea trials completed in Dec 2024.
K-572	Perm	885M	29 July 2016	27 March 2025	2026	Pacific	Sea trials as of Aug 2025	Structural modifications, reported to carry 3M22 Zircon hypersonic missiles.
K-563	Ulyanovsk	885M	27 July 2017	28 July 2026	2026	Northern	Launched	Also identified as a separate class (Project 09853) variant of the Yasen-class. Later clarified that the boat would be of the Yasen-M class.
K-xxx	Voronezh	885M	20 Jul 2020		2027	Northern	Under construction	To be equipped with 4,500 km capable Kalibr-M cruise missiles.
K-xxx	Vladivostok	885M	20 Jul 2020		2028	Pacific	Under construction	To be equipped with 4,500 km capable Kalibr-M cruise missiles.
K-xxx	Murmansk	885M	17 June 2026				Under construction	
K-xxx		885M					Announced	
K-xxx		885M					Announced	

== See also ==
- List of submarine classes in service
- Future of the Russian Navy
