= Russian submarine Kazan =

Russian submarine Kazan may refer to one of the following submarines of the Russian Navy:

- Russian submarine Kazan (Yankee class)
- Russian submarine Kazan (2016)
