= Russian submarine Krasnoyarsk =

Two submarines of the Russian Navy have been named Krasnoyarsk:

- Russian submarine Krasnoyarsk (K-173)
- Russian submarine Krasnoyarsk (K-571)
