= K-300P Bastion-P =

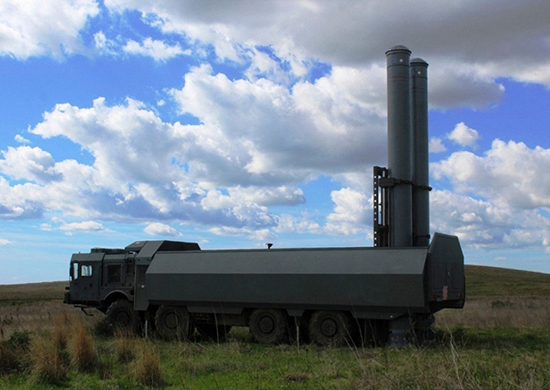
- Type: Mobile anti-ship and surface-to-surface missile system
- Place of origin: Russia

Service history
- In service: 2011–present
- Used by: Russia; Vietnam
- Wars: Syrian Civil War; Russian invasion of Ukraine

Production history
- Manufacturer: NPO Mashinostroenia
- Produced: 2010

Video of Bastion launch on Kotelny Island

The K-300P Bastion-P (NATO reporting name SS-C-5 Stooge) is a Russian mobile coastal defence missile system. It was developed with the Belarusian company Tekhnosoyuzproekt.

== Design ==
The main role of the Bastion-P is to engage surface ships, including carrier battle groups, convoys, and landing craft. A typical battery is composed of 1–2 command and control vehicles based on the Kamaz 43101 6×6 truck, one support vehicle, four launcher vehicles based on the MZKT-7930 8×8 chassis, each operated by a 3-man crew and holding two missiles, and four loader vehicles; launcher vehicles can be located up to 25 km (16 mi) away from the command and control vehicles. Upon halting, missiles can be readied for firing within five minutes, and both fired in 2–5 second intervals. The mobile launcher can remain on active standby over a period of 3–5 days, or up to 30 days when accompanied by a combat duty support vehicle.

The missile used by the Bastion-P is the P-800 Oniks, a supersonic anti-ship missile with a 200–250 kg (440–550 lb) warhead. They are fired vertically from the launchers using a solid-fuel rocket booster for initial acceleration, then use a liquid-fuel ramjet for sustained cruising at Mach 2.5. The Oniks/Yakhont's maximum range varies at 120–300 km (75–186 mi; 65–162 nmi) using a low-low or hi-low flight trajectory respectively. Using GLONASS at the initial flight stage and active radar guidance when approaching a target, the missile can fly to an altitude of 14,000 m (46,000 ft) before descending to sea-skimming altitude of 5 m at the final stage, useful up to sea state 7.

The Predel-E over-the-horizon radar system was designed to support the Bastion missile system.

== Operational history ==
On 2 March 2011, it was reported that Russia would deploy the system on the Kuril Islands in the Far East. The deployment was finally conducted in 2016.

On 15 March 2015, it was reported that Russia had deployed the system in Crimea. In 2016 it was said that a silo-based Bastion system could be deployed at the Object 100 underground complex by 2020.

In 2015, Russian Northern Fleet Commander Admiral Vladimir Korolyov said that the Northern Fleet's Coastal Forces would receive new Bastion anti-ship missile complexes to support already existing S-400 deployments.

On 15 November 2016, Russia announced it had deployed K-300P Bastion-P systems to Syria, where it fired Oniks missiles at land targets as part of the Russian military intervention in Syria, demonstrating a previously undisclosed land-attack capability for the coastal defense system; the P-800 uses a combination of autopilot, INS, and a radio altimeter for mid-course guidance and a monopulse dual-mode active/passive seeker for terminal guidance. Modified software in the Bastion's guidance system enables the missiles to dive onto stationary land targets, striking programmed coordinates.

In 2021, Matua island in the Kuril Islands now hosts a battery. In 2022, Paramushir island in the Kuril Islands hosted an additional battery.

The Bastion was the primary launch platform of the Oniks missile strikes during the Russo-Ukrainian war in 2022 and 2023, which mainly targeted cities along the Northern Black Sea coast.

In 2026, according to the Ukrainian Navy, Russia first began deploying Bastion systems modified to use 3M22 Zircon hypersonic missiles, in order to supplement dwindling supplies of the older P-800 Oniks and other ballistic weapons. In March, Ukrainian forces reported their first successful strike against a Bastion system, which had been deployed in occupied Crimea to enable deep penetration into Ukrainian territory. The strike reportedly destroyed two Zircon missiles and one launcher, while damaging a second and killing 7 Russian personnel. On August 16, the Ukrainian military again reported successful strikes against a Bastion deployment area and launch sites; according to UNITED24 Media, these resulted in "significant losses in Russian weapons and personnel".

== Variants ==
- K-300P – transporter erector launcher (TEL) variant, land-attack cruise missile or anti-ship missile, used mainly in coastal missile forces
- K-300S – silo-based version; probably one of the roles will be in coastal missile forces.
- Bastion-E – another coastal variant

== Operators ==
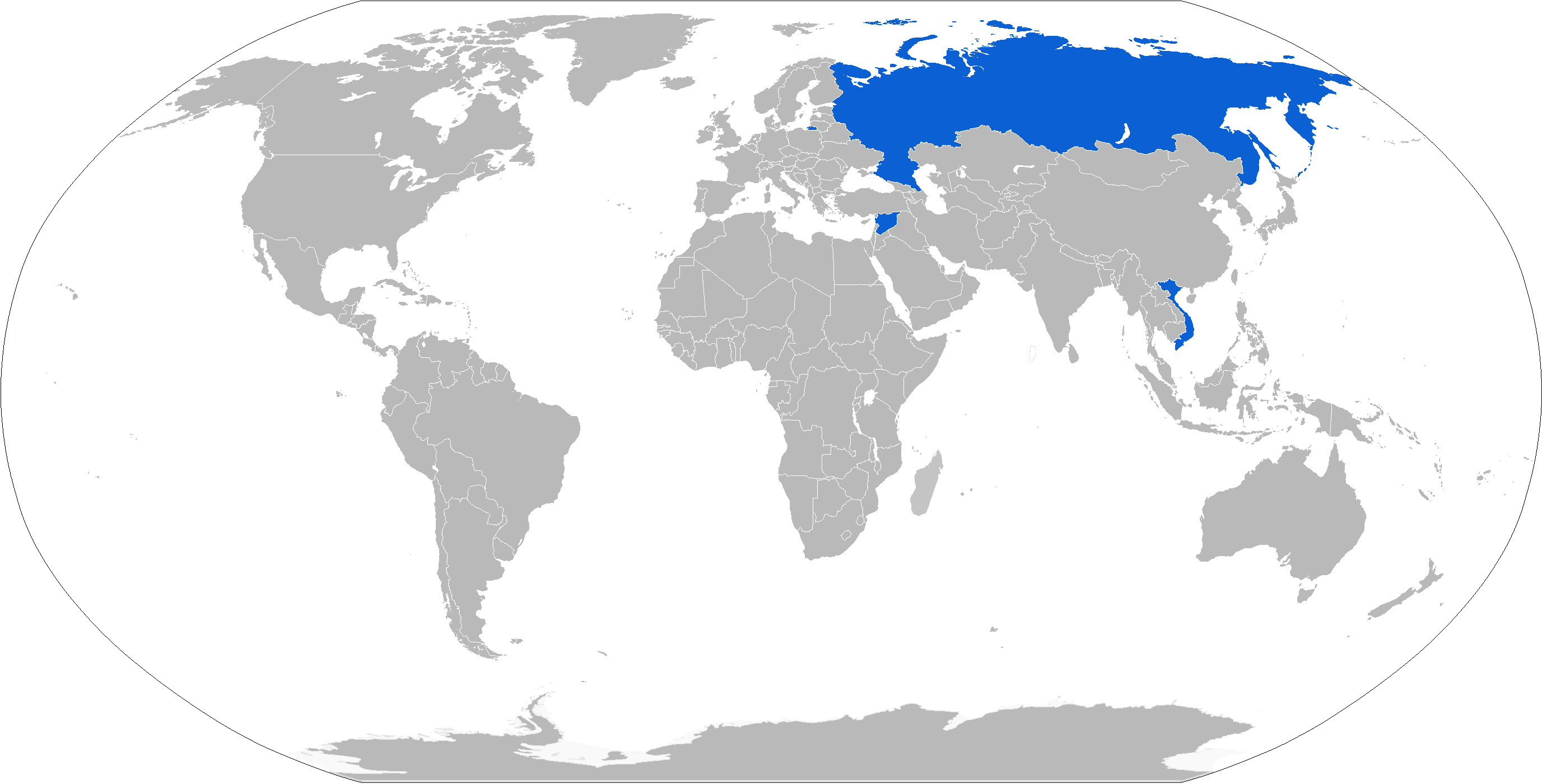
Map with K-300P operators in blue

- Russia
  - Russian Navy and coastal missile forces have 40 systems
- Vietnam
  - Vietnam People's Navy – bought at least two systems in early 2011. Commissioned by the coastal missile & artillery forces
- Egypt – the Egyptian Navy plans to acquire the system for securing its coasts and gas fields in the Mediterranean.

== See also ==
- 3K60 Bal
- A-222 Bereg
