= Lazurit Central Design Bureau =

United Shipbuilding Corporation subsidiary

- Company type: Joint-stock company
- Founded: 1953
- Headquarters: Nizhny Novgorod, Russia
- Products: Submarines
- Parent: United Shipbuilding Corporation
- Website: cdb-lazurit.ru

The Lazurit Central Design Bureau (Russian: Центральное конструкторское бюро "Лазурит") is a company based in Nizhny Novgorod, Russia. It is part of the United Shipbuilding Corporation.

The Lazurit Central Design Bureau is a leading design firm in the field of submarines and submersible technology.

Lazurit is one of Russia's three main centers of submarine design, along with Rubin Central Design Bureau for Marine Engineering and Malakhit Marine Engineering Bureau, all three being named after minerals: lazurite (Russian: лазурит), ruby (Russian: рубин), and malachite (Russian: малахит).

== Products ==
- Romeo-class submarine
- Charlie-class submarine
- Sierra-class submarine
- Priz-class deep-submergence rescue vehicle
- Russian deep submergence rescue vehicle AS-28
- Mir (submersible)

== See also ==
- Rubin Design Bureau
- Malakhit Marine Engineering Bureau
