= Otvet =

Russian anti-submarine missile system

91R Otvet
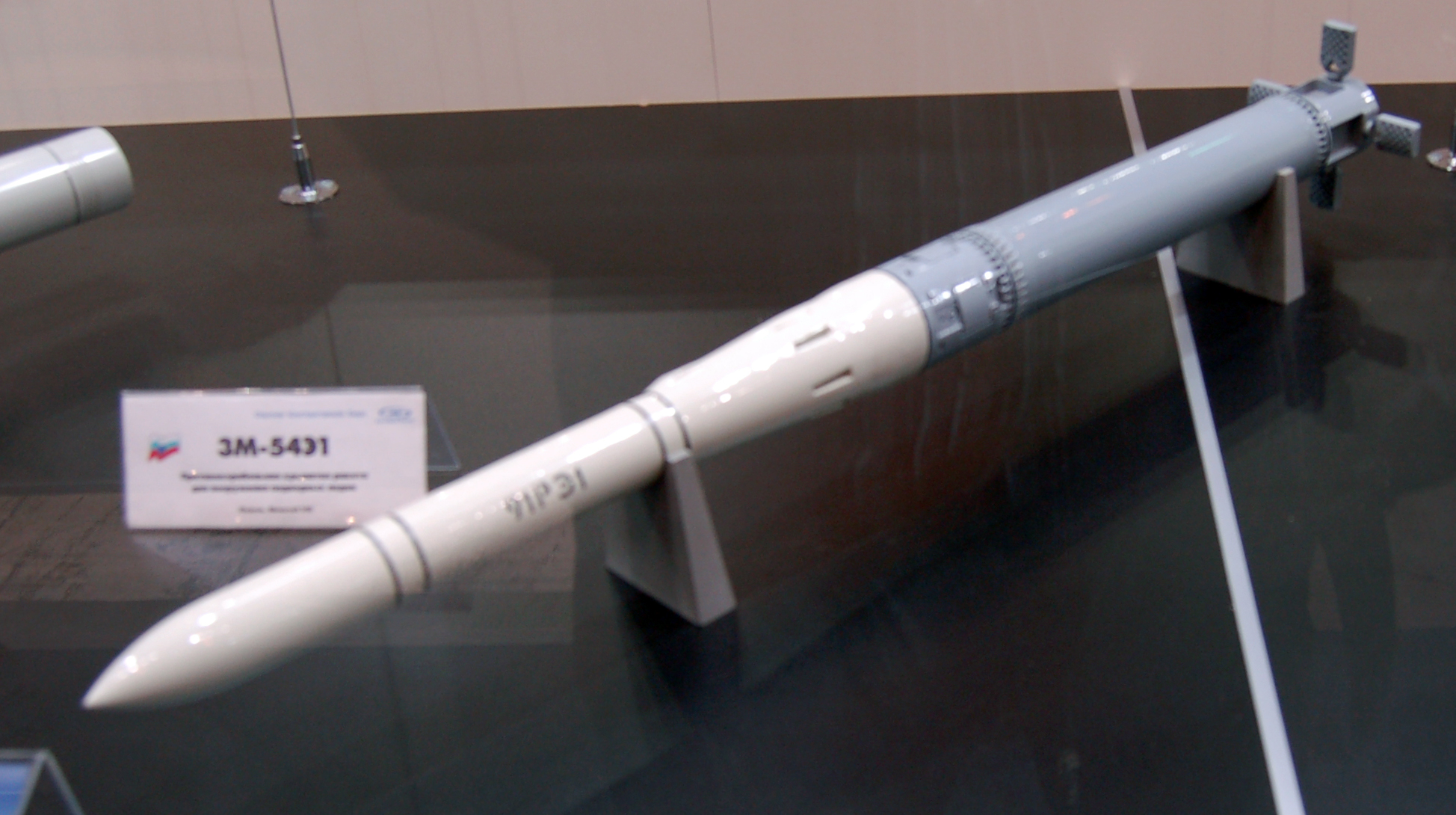
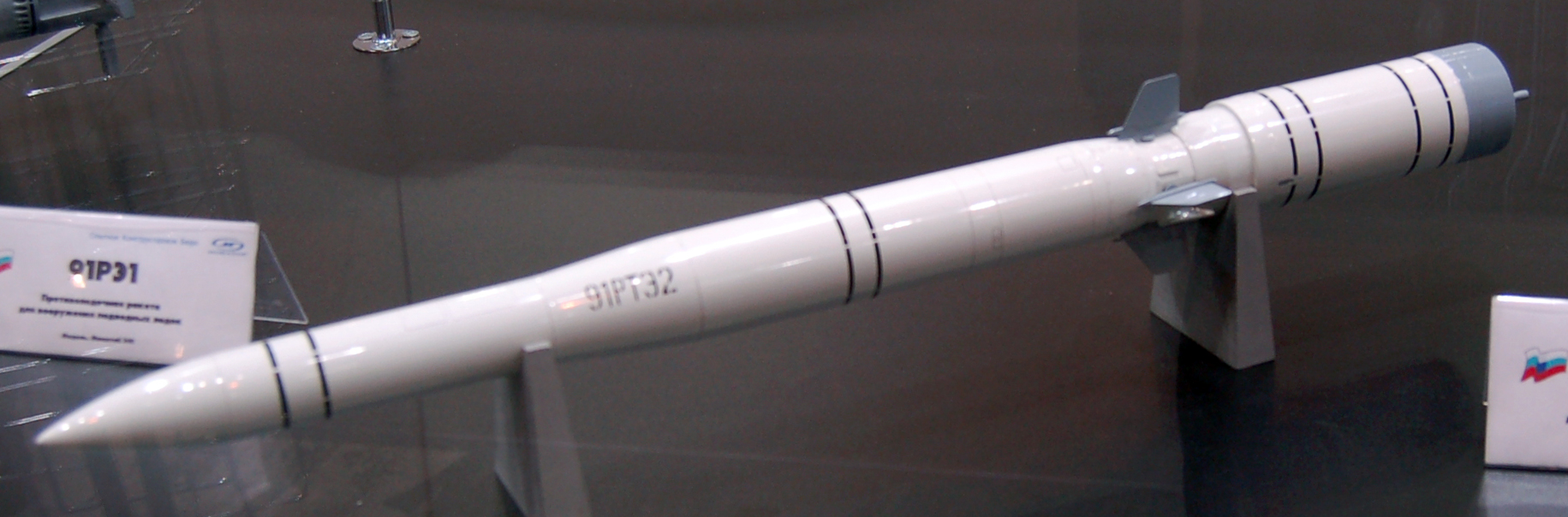
- Maquette of a torpedo-tube-launched Otvet displayed at MAKS-2009 Maquette of VLS-launched variant at MAKS-2009
- Type: Anti-submarine missile
- Place of origin: Russia

Service history
- In service: Reportedly 2022–present
- Used by: Russian Navy; Reportedly Korean People's Navy

Production history
- Designer: NPO Novator; Gidropribor; Electropribor
- Designed: mid-1990s-2000
- Manufacturer: Gidropribor
- Developed from: RPK-6 Vodopad (adapted for Kalibr family)
- Produced: 2019
- Variants: Domestic: 91R (torpedo-tube-launched), 91RT (VLS-launched); Export (Note: In Russian designations, the addition of a letter E (Э) symbolizes an export (Экспорт) variant.): 91RE1 (torpedo tube), 91RE2 (VLS)

Specifications
- Mass: 91R/91RE1: 2,050–2,100 kg (4,520–4,630 lb); 91RT/91RE2: 1,200 kg (2,600 lb)
- Length: 91R/91RE1: 7.65 m (25.1 ft); 91RT/91RE2: 6.2 m (20 ft)
- Diameter: 533 mm (21.0 in)
- Warhead: Separating anti-submarine torpedo: 91R:APR‑3M; 91RE1:APR‑3ME; 91RT:MPT‑1UM; 91RE2:MPT‑1UME
- Warhead weight: APR-3M/APR-3ME: 475 kg (1,047 lb) total mass (Note: An English version of the website can be found at Missilery.info); MPT-1UM/MPT-1UME: 300 kg (660 lb) total mass, 60 kg (130 lb) warhead
- Blast yield: APR-3M/APR-3ME: 74 kg (163 lb) in TNT equivalent MPT-1UM/MPT-1UME: Not stated
- Engine: Two-stage solid fuel rocket motor (booster + second stage)
- Operational range: 91R/91RE1: 5–50 km (3.1–31.1 mi) from 20–50 m (66–164 ft) launch depth 5–35 km (3.1–21.7 mi) from 150 m (490 ft) launch depth 91RT/91RE2: Up to 40 km (25 mi)
- Maximum depth: 150 m (490 ft)
- Maximum speed: 91R/91RE1:Mach 2.5 (3,060 km/h; 1,900 mph); 91RT/91RE2: Mach 2 (2,500 km/h; 1,500 mph)
- Guidance system: During flight: Inertial navigation system Underwater: active/passive acoustic homing
- Launch platform: 91R/91RE1:Torpedo tube 91RT/91RE2: Vertical launching system

The Otvet (Russian: Ответ, lit. 'Answer') is a Russian anti-submarine missile system developed and manufactured by Gidropribor and Electropribor. Russian media reported that the Otvet entered service with the Russian Navy in January 2022.

The Otvet complex comprises various systems and sensor arrays, and missiles which carry anti-submarine torpedoes. The missiles used by Otvet are the 91R and 91RT, which are based on the RPK-6 Vodopad and have been adapted to function with Kalibr/Club-family systems. The export designations for these missiles are 91RE1 and 91RE2 (also designated 91RTE2 by some sources).

It can be launched from surface ships and submarines, either from a vertical launching system or torpedo tubes. Otvet is used on Admiral Gorshkov-class frigates, Yasen-class submarines, Gremyashchiy-class corvettes, and the modernized Udaloy-class destroyer Marshal Shaposhnikov. It is planned for use on Laika-class submarines and the modernized Kirov-class battlecruiser Admiral Nakhimov in the future. Some sources also report the 91RE1 missile being used on North Korean Choe Hyon-class destroyers.

== Design ==
According to media sources, the ship-launched Otvet consists of a shipborne sonar complex, a helicopter-deployed dipping sonar, communications and pre-launch preparation systems, and 91R-family missiles. (Note: The Nezavisimaya Gazeta also states that the complex will also be adapted for submarines. Sources indicate that Yasen-class submarines are equipped with the 91R missile, which means that submarines use the 91R/91RE1 missile solely with the Kalibr-PL/Club-S system .) Based on available reporting, little is known about the communications and sensor arrays. However, reports describing 91R-family missiles state that they are able to be integrated and operated with Kalibr/Club family complexes. (Note: An English version of the website can be found at Missilery.info)

The 91R family of missiles is described as based on the RPK-6 Vodopad.

Some sources identify the 91R's NATO reporting name as SS-N-27 Sizzler, although the designation applies to the broader Kalibr/Club anti-ship missile family.

=== Variants ===
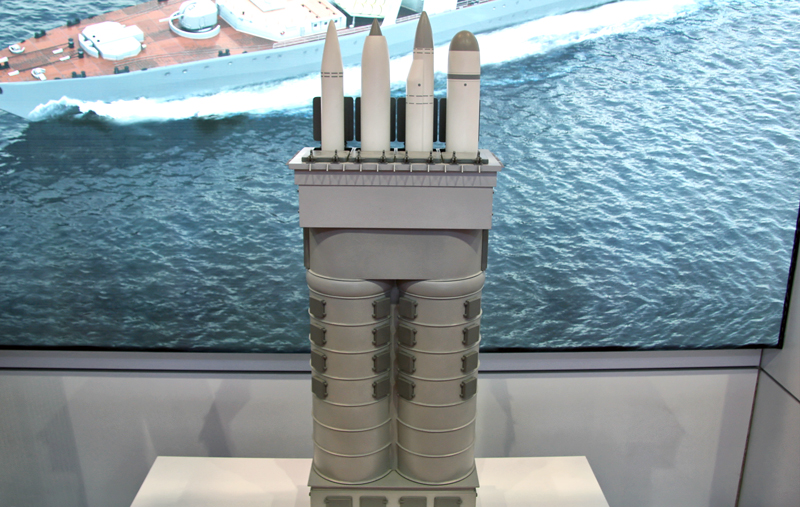
A display of the 3S-14 in 2011, the missile farthest left is the 91RT.

The 91R family comprises two domestic variants, the 91R and the 91RT, with corresponding export designations 91RE1 and 91RE2. Some sources designate the latter as 91RTE2. The 91R/91RE1 is fired from 533 mm torpedo tubes on vessels equipped with the Kalibr/Club system. While primarily a submarine-launched weapon, the 91RE1 can be deployed from torpedo tubes on certain surface ships. The 91RT/91RE2 can be fired from the 3S-14 universal launchers (or other Kalibr/Club family systems) on surface ships.

=== Specifications ===
The 91R is equipped with a separating anti-submarine torpedo. The torpedo tube-launched variant is described as carrying the APR-3M lightweight rocket torpedo, (Note: An English version of the diagram is available at Missilery.info.) with the 91RE1 carrying APR-3ME export variant. The VLS-launched variant carries the MPT-1UM lightweight torpedo, with MPT-1UME export variant for 91RE2.

Sources differ on the mass of the torpedo-tube-launched variant, giving 2,050 kg (4,520 lb) and 2,100 kg (4,600 lb).

The missile uses a two-stage solid-fuel rocket motor and inertial guidance during its flight. It is launched and flies at a top speed of Mach 2.5 (3,060 km/h; 1,900 mph) for the 91R/91RE1, or Mach 2 (2,500 km/h; 1,500 mph) for the 91RT/91RE2 toward the designated target area, where it releases an anti-submarine acoustic torpedo by parachute. The torpedo then enters the water and searches for the target using acoustic homing.

Sources differ on the flight path of the 91R family. Those reporting the 2000s-era 91RE1 family note that it flies in a ballistic trajectory, while more recent reports about modern Otvet appear to describe a low-flying path, similar to that of its sister weapon, the Kalibr.

The submarine-launched variant can be launched from a maximum depth of 150 m (490 ft). From that depth, it has a range of 5–35 km (3.1–21.7 mi). From depths of 20–50 m (66–164 ft), the Otvet has a range of 5–50 km (3.1–31.1 mi) from 20–50 m (66–164 ft). The VLS-launched variant has a range of up to 40 km (25 mi). Rossiyskaya Gazeta stated in 2021 that the Otvet was being improved, and that the 40 km range was expected to be doubled. In an article reporting Otvet's entry into service, Rossiyskaya Gazeta claimed that the work on range increase was continuing.

== History ==
=== Development ===
The development of the 91RE1 was led by NPO Novator in the mid-1990s as part of the Kalibr-PL/Club-S project for the Indian Navy's Project 877EKM (Sindhughosh-class) diesel-electric submarines. The development of a launcher for UGST-type torpedoes and 91RUK missiles (Note: This variant of the missile has no other documented uses or differences from the original missile, except for a report by Janes which noted that the "91RU" missile would be used on the upcoming Laika-class submarines) was led by NPO Mashinostroyeniya. The missile system was tested on Northern and Baltic Fleet submarines. The Club-S systems were eventually installed on many Kilo-class submarines for various export customers, although it is uncertain if the modern-day Otvet is or will be used on those platforms.

The 91RE2/91RTE2 was also developed for the Kalibr-NK/Club-N family and to be launched from 3S-14 vertical launchers. Little has been reported about its early development.

Work on the system was later resumed, with development resulting in the Otvet anti-submarine missile complex, intended for use with Kalibr-family systems. (Note: The Choe Hyon-class destroyer, which is reportedly equipped with 91RE1 missiles, is not described in available reporting as employing a Kalibr or Club system.) The 91RE1 and 91RE2 missiles were given domestic designations, 91R for torpedo-tube-launched models, and 91RT for VLS-launched models. The JSC Concern Gidropribor, which is part of the Tactical Missiles Corporation, led the production of the missile system. The Electropribor concern was also reported to have participated in the development of the modern Otvet.

=== Production and operational history ===
In October 2019, the Saint Petersburg government reported that experimental serial production had begun at Gidropribor and that trials were expected to begin in 2020. Deputy Defence Minister Alexey Krivoruchko stated that the system would be installed on corvettes, frigates, and cruisers, notably on the modernized Kirov-class battlecruiser Admiral Nakhimov.

Multiple sources, citing the Russian Ministry of Defense, reported that state trials of the Otvet on the Admiral Gorshkov-class frigate Admiral Kasatonov had been completed in November 2020. It also was announced, consistent with 2019 reports, that the missile would be used on Admiral Gorshkov-class ships, the modernized Udaloy-class ASW destroyers, (Note: As of 2026, only one Udaloy has been upgraded - the Marshal Shaposhnikov.) Gremyashchiy-class corvettes, and the Admiral Nakhimov.

In December 2021, the modernized Udaloy-class frigate (Note: Previously a destroyer, classified as frigate after modernization.) Marshal Shaposhnikov launched an Otvet anti-submarine missile at a submerged target as part of an exercise in the Peter the Great Gulf. During the exercise, the Shaposhnikov searched for and tracked a target simulating an enemy submarine before firing an Otvet missile from its universal launchers. Citing information from the Russian Ministry of Defense, multiple sources claimed that the launch was successful and the weapon struck its target.

Multiple sources reported, most quoting an unnamed defense-industry source, that the Otvet was accepted into service with the Russian Navy in January 2022, and that the missiles had been serially supplied to Russian Navy ships for approximately one year before the report. TASS, however, stated that it had not received official confirmation of the service entry. (Note: An English version of the page can be found at TASS.)

According to sources which quoted the Russian Ministry of Defense, the corvette Gremyashchiy launched an Otvet missile against an underwater target in the Sea of Japan in May 2022. The missile's warhead reportedly hit the target, and a video of the launch, published by the Russian MoD was included in the reports.

During the Ocean-2024 naval exercise, a Northern Fleet anti-submarine group including ships, submarines, and aircraft carried out an electronic Otvet launch. The frigate Admiral Kasatonov was the launch platform of the Otvet during the exercise. The event was reported by Interfax, quoting the Russian Ministry of Defense.

The 91RE1 was reportedly seen during a showcase of North Korea's new Choe Hyon-class destroyer. As it is the 91RE1 designation, it is launched from 533mm torpedo tubes, even though it is equipped on a surface ship. Sources noted that the missile may be a previously unknown North Korean missile which highly resembles the 91RE1

During the 2025 July Storm exercise, it was reported that the Gremyashchiy launched an anti-submarine missile at an underwater training target in the Pacific Ocean. Although the missile type was not explicitly stated, the Russian Ministry of Defense claimed that the missile was launched from universal launchers for Kalibr and Oniks missiles, the same ones used to facilitate Otvet launch.

== Launch platforms ==
=== 91R/91RE1 ===
- Yasen-class submarine
- Choe Hyon-class destroyer – allegedly

==== Planned ====
- Laika-class submarine

=== 91RT/91RE2 ===
- Admiral Gorshkov-class frigate
- modernized Udaloy-class frigate Marshal Shaposhnikov
- Gremyashchiy-class corvette

==== Planned ====
- modernized Kirov-class battlecruiser Admiral Nakhimov
- Admiral Vinogradov (if upgraded to 1155M standard)

== Gallery ==
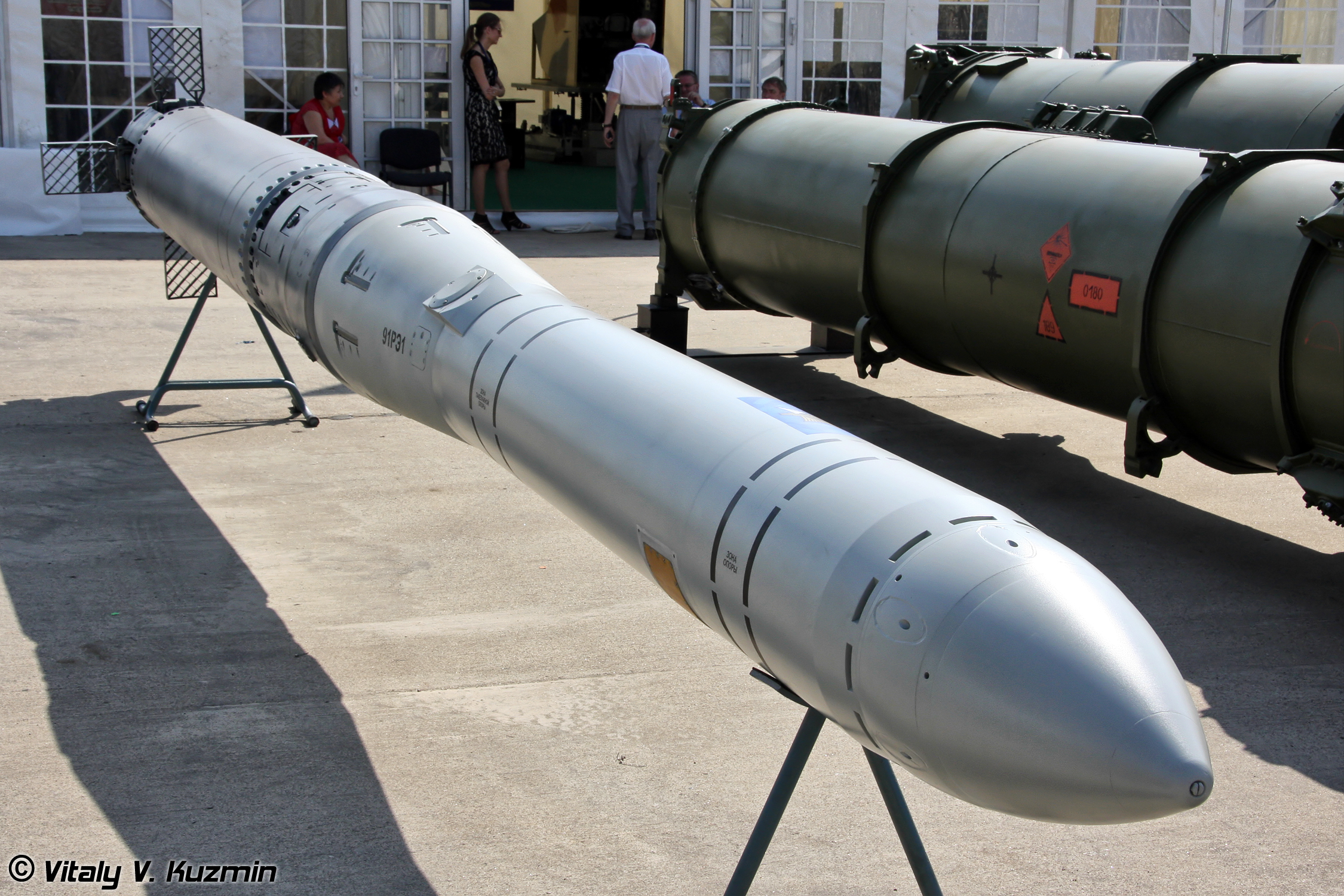
The 91RE1 on static display

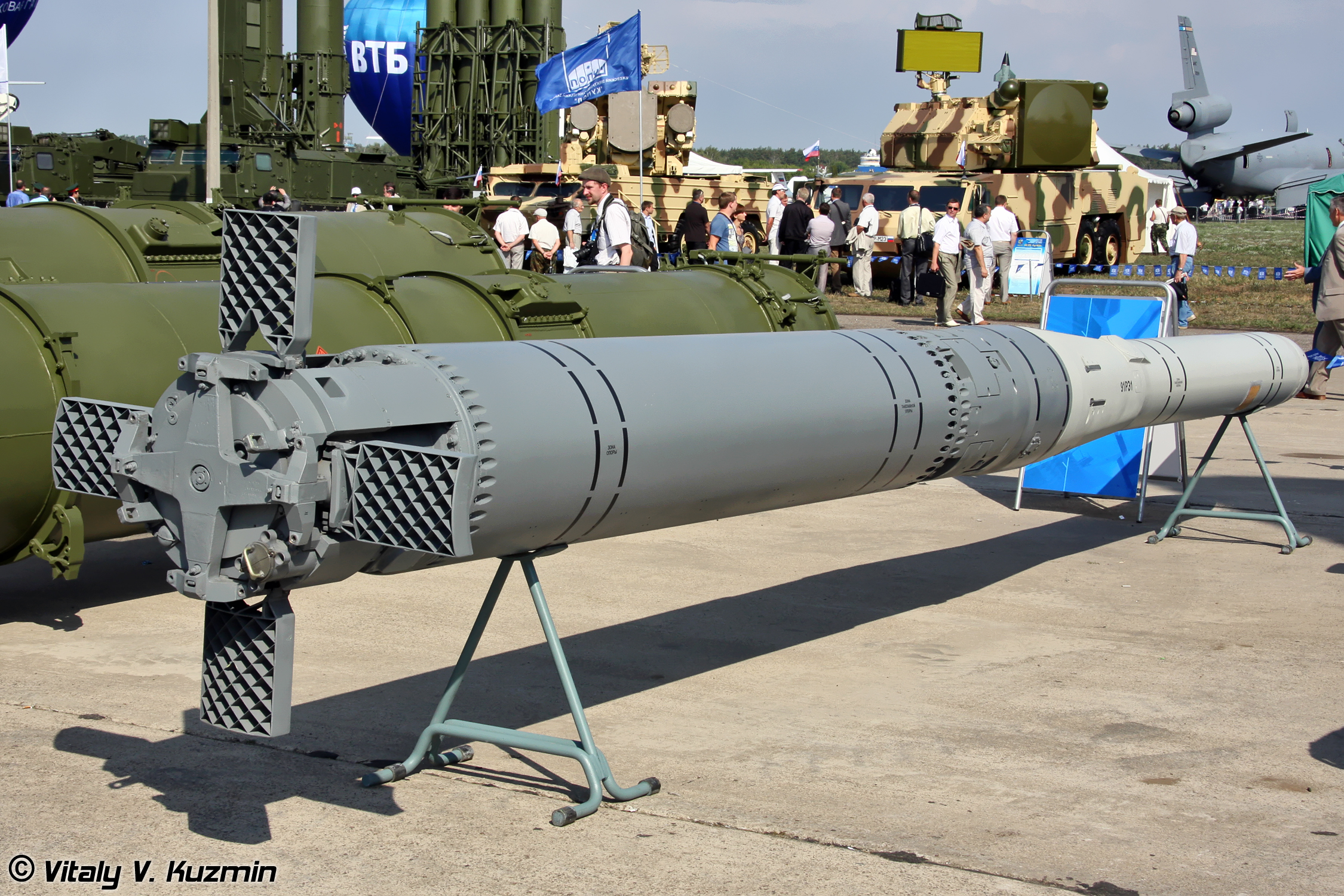
Rear view of the 91RE1, showing its steering fins

== See also ==
- RPK-6 Vodopad/RPK-7 Veter – (Soviet Union)
- 3S-14 – (Russia)
- Kalibr (missile family) – (Russia)
- APR-3 torpedo – (Russia)
- RUM-139 VL-ASROC – (United States)
