= Russian submarine Severodvinsk =

Yasen-class nuclear attack submarine

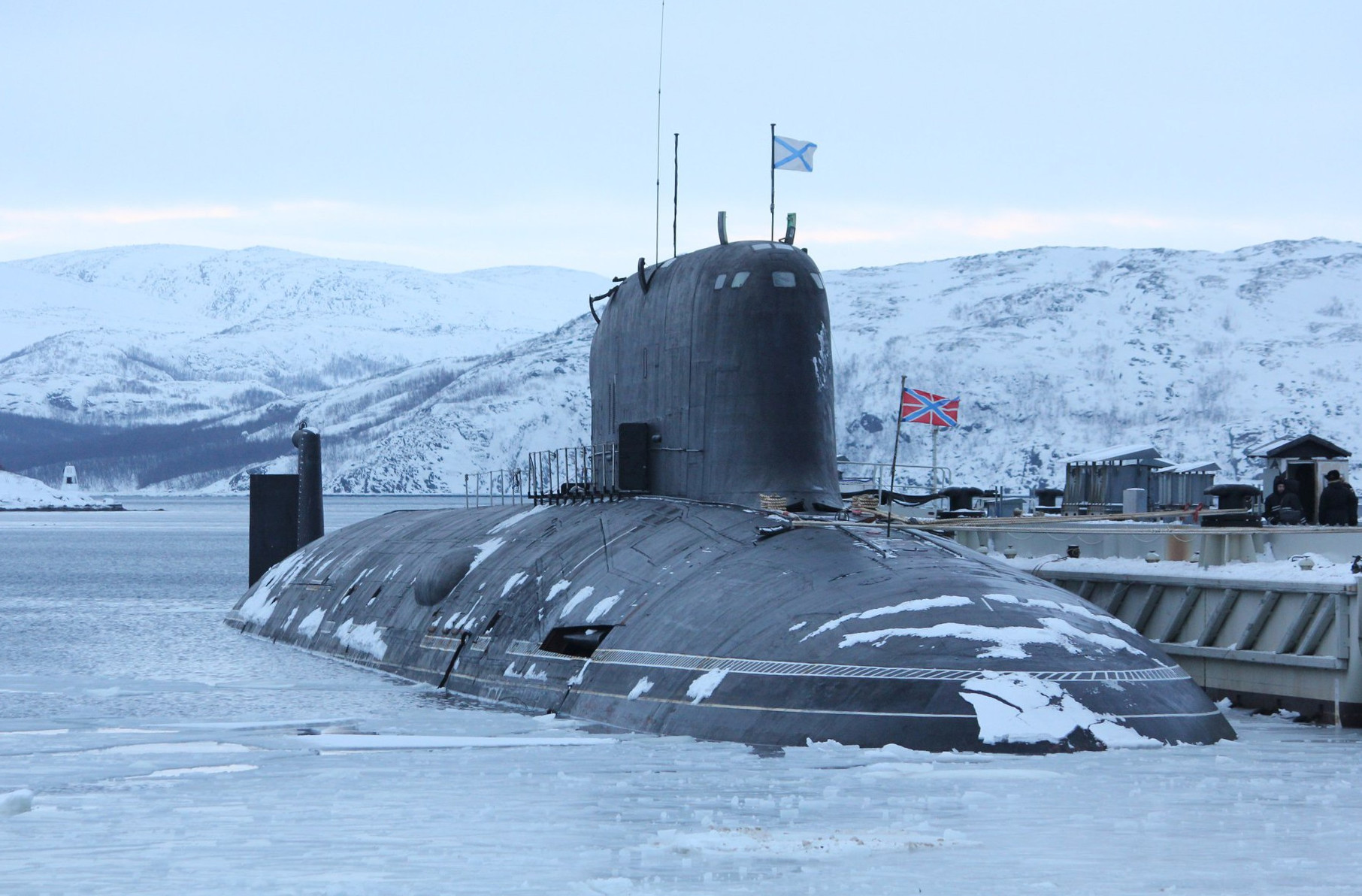
- K-560 Severodvinsk

History

Russia
- Name: K-560 Severodvinsk
- Namesake: Severodvinsk
- Builder: Sevmash
- Laid down: 21 December 1993
- Launched: 15 June 2010
- Commissioned: 30 December 2013
- In service: 17 June 2014
- Status: Active

General characteristics
- Type: Nuclear-powered attack submarine
- Displacement: Surfaced: 8,600 tons; Submerged: 13,800 tons
- Length: 139.2 m (457 ft)
- Beam: 13 m (43 ft)
- Propulsion: OK-650V water-cooled, water-moderated reactor, 190 MWt
- Speed: Surfaced: 20 kn (37 km/h; 23 mph); Submerged (silent) (Note: Information here is inconsistent. All data which has sources is included): 28 kn (52 km/h; 32 mph) or 20 kn (37 km/h; 23 mph); Submerged (max): 35 kn (65 km/h; 40 mph)
- Range: Unlimited
- Endurance: Only limited by food and maintenance requirements
- Test depth: Up to 600 m (2,000 ft)
- Complement: 85
- Sensors & processing systems: MGK-600 Irtysh-Amfora spherical bow sonar; Flank and towed array sonar systems; MRK-50 Albatross (NATO reporting name: "Snoop Pair") Surface-search radar; Rim Hat electronic support/countermeasures system
- Armament: Eight missile silos each equipped with a 3S-14 VLS with each silo capable of carrying: 4 (32 total) Tsircon hypersonic cruise missiles; 4 (32 total) Oniks anti-ship cruise missiles; 5 (40 total) Kalibr anti-ship and land attack submarine-launched cruise missiles; 10 x torpedo tubes (533 mm) with up to 30 Futlyar (UGST-M) heavyweight torpedoes, Otvet anti-submarine missiles, and naval mines; Igla-M surface-to-air missiles

Severodvinsk (K-560, Russian: К-560 «Северодвинск») is the lead ship of the Project 885 Yasen class nuclear-powered cruise missile submarines of the Russian Navy. Severodvinsk was laid down on 21 December 1993 at the Sevmash shipyard but its construction was delayed because of budget problems. It was launched on 15 June 2010 and commissioned on 30 December 2013.

== History ==
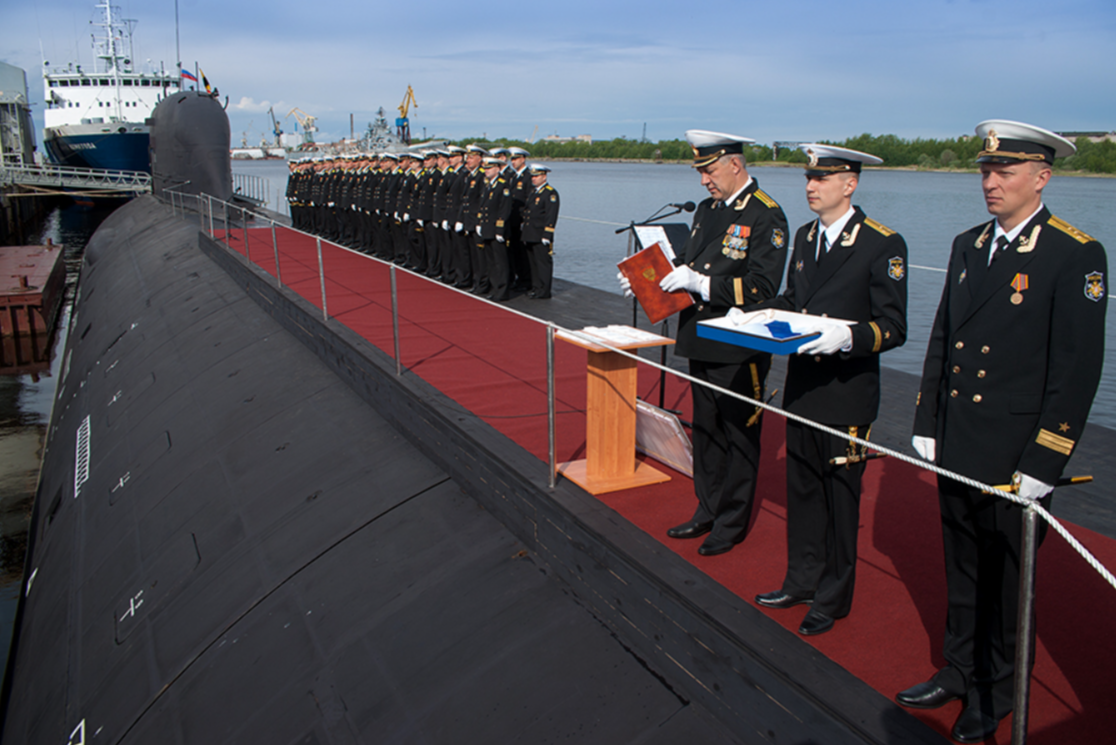
Ceremony of raising the flag of the Russian Navy on the lead nuclear submarine Severodvinsk on June 17, 2014

The construction of the submarine started in 1993 and was first planned to be launched in 1998. However budgetary problems delayed the construction for years, and it was only launched on 15 June 2010. Severodvinsk undertook her initial sea trials in the fall of 2011.

On 7 November 2012, Severodvinsk successfully launched a Kalibr cruise missile (anti-ship version) from submerged position at a sea target in the White Sea. Later that month, the submarine successfully test fired two additional Kalibr cruise missiles (land attack version). The launches occurred on 26 November 2012 from a surfaced position and two days later from a submerged position.

Severodvinsk was commissioned into the Russian Navy on 30 December 2013. The flag-raising ceremony was held on 17 June 2014, marking its introduction into the Northern Fleet.

In November 2014, the submarine successfully tested its rescue capsule which surfaced from a depth of 40 metres (130 ft) with five crew members inside.

Severodvinsk became combat-ready in early 2016. At the end of April 2016 and in August 2017, it conducted drills using 3M14 cruise missiles.

In October 2018 Severodvinsk spent several weeks in the Atlantic Ocean near the U.S. East Coast and, according to the Pentagon, was undetected by the United States.

On 28 March 2019, it launched a Kalibr cruise missile from a pier at its homebase. Previously, such launches were not possible. The submarine again launched Kalibr cruise missile during the Grom-2019 strategic nuclear exercise on 17 October 2019.

In Autumn 2019, she reportedly participated in the largest post-Cold War Russian submarine drills. The drills, sometimes dubbed as operation, included ten submarines, among them two diesel-electric and eight nuclear. The eight nuclear submarines reportedly constituted the Northern Fleet's entire available non-strategic nuclear submarine fleet at that time. The operation was supposedly testing Russian ability to breach the GIUK gap undetected and sail into the Atlantic Ocean, much like the operations Aport and Atrina in 1985 and 1987, respectively, when the Soviets deployed several SSNs near the U.S. coast before the Gorbachev-Reagan meeting. This time, the operation started a week before Commander of the Russian Northern Fleet Aleksandr Moiseyev and Russian Foreign Minister Sergey Lavrov met their Norwegian counterparts in Kirkenes, Norway. The operation was expected to last up to two months.

According to RF Defense Ministry sources, in late 2019 Severodvinsk trained submerging, surfacing and cruise missile fire in the Arctic.

On 5 February 2021, she successfully hit a coastal target in Chiza training ground, Arkhangelsk Oblast with a Kalibr missile. In October 2021, the submarine was reported to have carried out a successful launch of the hypersonic Tsirkon missile from the White Sea at a target in the Barents Sea.

In July 2022, the submarine was monitored on the surface by NATO naval forces as she transited from the Northern Fleet to the Baltic in company with the Akula-class submarine Vepr. In August 2022, Italian Navy sources reported the detection of a nuclear submarine, reported to be the Severodvinsk, submerged in the Mediterranean Sea to the south of Sicily, making it the first Russian nuclear submarine in the Mediterranean since Kursk and Tomsk in 1999.
