= Malakhit Marine Engineering Bureau =

Russian Submarine Designer

Coordinates: 59°51′45″N 30°19′54″E

- Company type: Open joint-stock company
- Industry: Shipbuilding arms industry
- Founded: 1948
- Headquarters: Saint Petersburg, Russia
- Products: Ships, submarines, missiles, torpedo tubes
- Parent: United Shipbuilding Corporation
- Website: malachite-spb.ru

Malakhit Marine Engineering Bureau (Russian: морское бюро машиностроения «Малахит») is a company based in Saint Petersburg, Russia. It is a subsidiary of the United Shipbuilding Corporation.

Malakhit has designed nuclear-powered attack submarines including the November, Victor, Alfa, Akula, Yasen and the Laika classes. Malakhit also designs torpedo tubes and submarine missile armament complexes. In addition it designs small submersibles for intelligence collection, deep-diving oceanographic research and rescue, and commercial applications.

Malakhit is one of Russia's three main centers of submarine design, along with Rubin Central Design Bureau for Marine Engineering and Lazurit Central Design Bureau, all three being named after minerals: malachite (Russian: малахит), ruby (Russian: рубин), and lazurite (Russian: лазурит).

== See also ==
- Rubin Design Bureau
- Lazurit Central Design Bureau
