= 3M22 Zircon =

Russian supersonic anti-ship missile

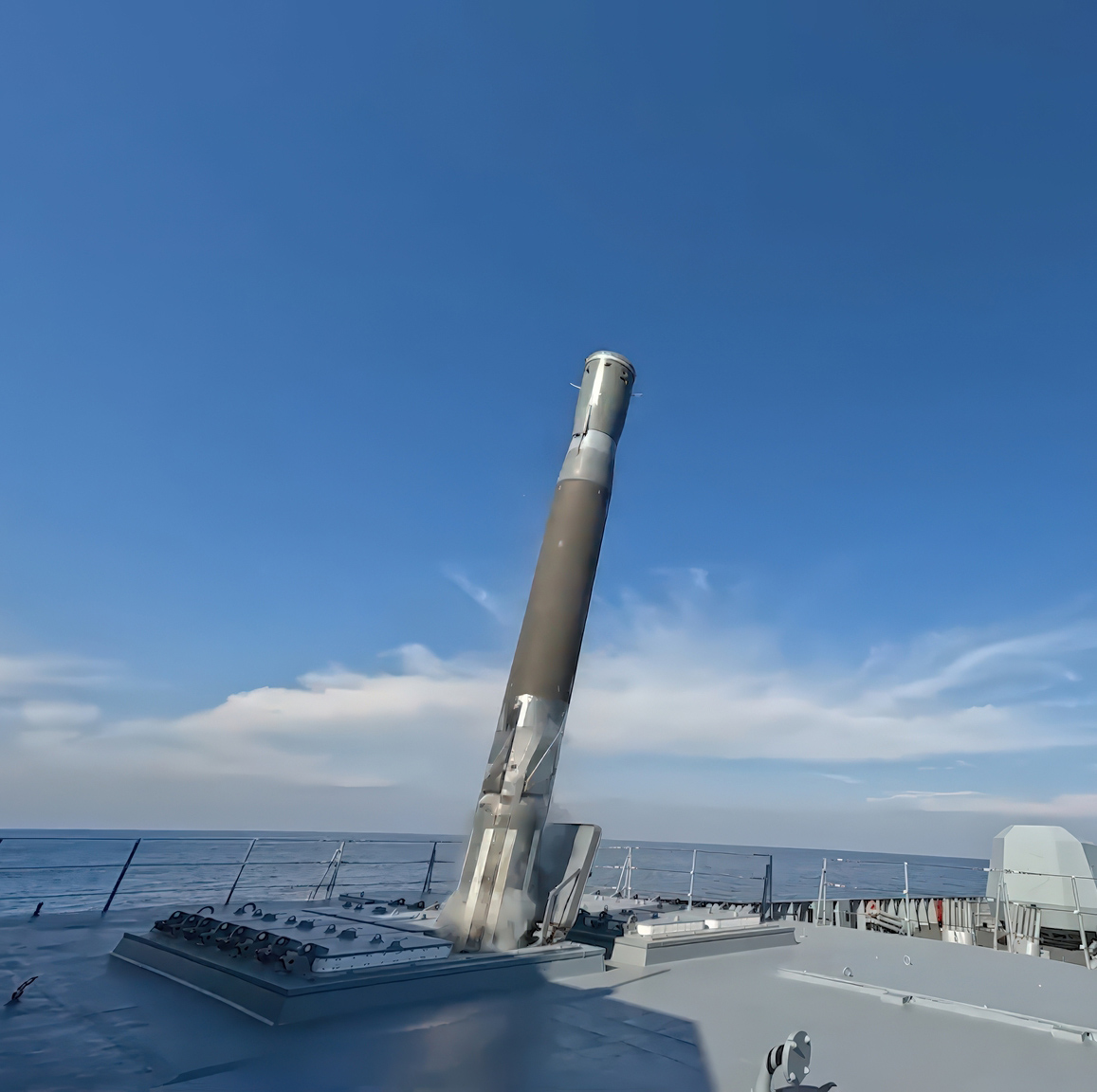
- Type: Anti-ship missile Land-attack missile
- Place of origin: Russia

Service history
- In service: In service (January 4, 2023)
- Used by: Russian Navy
- Wars: Russo-Ukrainian war

Production history
- Designer: NPO Mashinostroyeniya
- Manufacturer: NPO Mashinostroyeniya
- Unit cost: Unknown, unofficially estimated up to US$10 million
- Produced: 2021–present

Specifications
- Length: 9 m (30 ft)
- Diameter: 60 cm (24 in)
- Effective firing range: 1,000 km (620 mi)
- Maximum firing range: 1,000 km (620 mi)
- Engine: solid propellant rocket motor
- Propellant: Solid
- Operational range: >1,000 km (540 nmi; 620 mi)
- Flight altitude: 28 km (92,000 ft)
- Maximum speed: Mach 9 (6,900 mph; 11,000 km/h; 3.1 km/s) (Claimed max), Mach 6.8 (5,180 mph; 8,330 km/h; 2.31 km/s) (Sustained flight)
- Launch platform: Submarine, surface ship, land-based (in development)

The 3M22 Zircon, also spelled Tsirkon (Russian: Циркон, NATO reporting name: SS-N-33), is a Russian nuclear-capable missile. Produced by NPO Mashinostroyeniya for the Russian Navy, the missile utilizes the 3S-14 launch platforms on frigates and submarines. The missile has a reported maximum top speed of Mach 9, which is disputed by analysts; its sustained flight speeds are significantly lower (Mach 5.5-6) and it is described as slowing further before terminal impact. The weapon was first used during the Russo-Ukrainian war.

== Development ==
External videos
- Zircon on YouTube
- The first launch of the Zircon missile from the Admiral Gorshkov frigate on YouTube
- The second launch of the Zircon missile from the frigate Admiral Gorshkov on YouTube
- Military TV explainer on YouTube

The Zircon is reported to represent a further development of the Hypersonic Experimental Flying Vehicle (ru. GELA / HELA) developed by NPO Mashinostroyeniya.

The Zircon was test-fired on June 3, 2017, almost a year earlier than scheduled. Another flight test reportedly occurred on December 10, 2018, during which the Russian government claimed the missile attained a speed of Mach 8.

On February 20, 2019, Russian President Vladimir Putin said that the missile can accelerate up to Mach 9 and destroy both sea and land targets within 1,000 km (540 nmi; 620 mi). On December 24, 2019, Putin stated that Zircon's land-based version was in development.

According to the commander-in-chief of the Russian Navy Nikolai Yevmenov, as of January 2020, the missile was still in the testing phase and still experiencing some problems. Modernized frigates are expected to be the first platform to receive the missile, and the tests are to be continued in parallel with the Navy's armament with the Kalibr cruise missile. Yevmenov further stated that Zircon is expected to enter service within a few years.

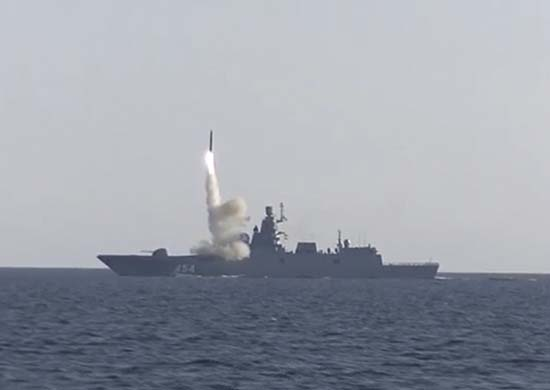
The Admiral Gorshkov launches a Zircon missile

In early January 2020, Zircon was first test-launched from the frigate Admiral Gorshkov in the Barents Sea, and reportedly hit a ground target in the Northern Urals, exceeding the distance of 500 km. On October 7, 2020, the Russian Chief of General Staff, Valery Gerasimov, stated a Zircon was launched from Admiral Gorshkov in the White Sea and successfully hit a sea target in the Barents Sea 450 km (280 mi) away; according to Russian state media sources it reached a speed of "more than Mach 8" and altitude of 28 km (17 mi). On November 26, 2020, the Russian Defense Ministry announced the successful test of a missile launched from Admiral Gorshkov in the White Sea, allegedly hitting a naval target 450 km away in the Barents Sea.

On October 4, 2021, the Ministry of Defence of Russia announced the successful first test of a missile launched from a nuclear submarine while surfaced. The Defense Ministry, which tested firing the Zircon missile from a warship in July, said that the nuclear submarine Severodvinsk fired the missile while deployed in the Barents Sea and had hit its chosen target. Low-quality video footage released by the ministry showed the missile shooting upwards from a submarine, its glare lighting up the night sky and illuminating the water's surface.

A Zircon missile test-launched from the Northern Fleet's frigate Admiral Gorshkov allegedly struck a naval target in the White Sea with a direct hit, Russia's Defense Ministry reported on November 18, 2021. The crew of the Admiral Gorshkov, as part of the completion of the cycle of tests of missile weapons, fired another Zircon missile at a sea target on November 29 and another one at a coastal target on December 16.

On July 31, 2022, speaking in St Petersburg on Russia's Naval Day, Putin announced that the Black Sea Fleet would be equipped with Zircon anti-ship missiles "in the coming months". On December 23, 2022, Defense Minister Sergey Shoigu announced that the Admiral Gorshkov had received a batch of Zircon missiles.

According to classified documents, Russia ordered 80 missiles annually for 2024–2026.

== Design ==
3M22 was believed in 2017 to be a maneuvering, winged hypersonic cruise missile with a lift-generating center body. A booster stage with solid-fuel engines accelerates it to supersonic speeds, after which a scramjet motor with liquid fuel (Detsilin) (JP-10 jet fuel equivalent) in the second stage accelerates it to hypersonic speeds.

However, subsequent analysis in 2026 of Zircon wreckage by the Ukrainian Scientific Research Institute of Forensic Expertise, indicated no presence of a scramjet or liquid fuel, and that the missile appears to be a traditional ballistic or quasi-ballistic missile using a two-stage solid rocket motor. Neither existing imagery nor Russian patents on the missile indicate the presence of the air-duct required for a scramjet operation; further patent activity form NPO MAshinostroyeniya and NPO Iskra has supported solid rocket motors incorporating arrangements for aerodynamic-control equipment around the exhaust system, consistent with a traditional solid-fueled rocket motor found on a ballistic missile. According to reporting from The War Zone, recovered Zircon debris included a part of a solid-propellant rocket motor associated with Zircon’s second stage rather than simply its launch booster (which would be required on a true scramjet-powered cruise missile to bring it up to operating speed).

The missile's range is estimated to be 135 to 270 nautical miles (155 to 311 mi; 250 to 500 km) at low level, and up to 400 nmi (460 mi; 740 km) in a semi-ballistic trajectory; average range is around 400–450 km (250–280 mi; 220–240 nmi). According to Russian media (2017), the longest possible range is 540 nmi (620 mi; 1,000 km) and for this purpose a new fuel was created. Russian media sources claim that its speed and precision would make it more lethal to large targets such as aircraft carriers.

Zircon's speed has led to claims that it could stand a higher chance of penetrating existing naval defence systems. At high speeds within the atmosphere, air pressure in front of a missile forms a plasma cloud as it moves, absorbing radio waves and blinding any radar or IR seeker on the missile, requiring it to slow to a speed of Mach 5–6 or lower in its terminal phase to strike a target (such as a warship) and generates an enormous IR signature, making it extremely easy to detect and track by EO/IR sensors. According to the Royal United Services Institute, kinetic energy is the single best predictor of lethality against large targets (more so than warhead size), and thus the high speed of missile would seem to make it an optimal vector of attack against larger vessels.

A ground-launched version of Zircon, based on a wheeled carrier similar to the SS-C-5, was developed after the naval version.

== Deployment ==
In January 2023 Zircons were first deployed on the Admiral Gorshkov-class frigates.

As of 2023, Admiral Nakhimov is being modernised in order to start sea trials. The ship's P-700 Granit anti-ship missiles are being replaced with the 3S-14 universal vertical launch system (VLS), capable of carrying the Oniks, Kalibr and Zircon anti-ship missiles; the vessel is to be equipped with 80 such missiles. The other active Kirov-class ship, Pyotr Velikiy, will undergo a similar procedure. After completion of their refit, the ships could carry 40–80 anti-ship missiles of different types.

Other platforms that will receive Zircons are Gremyashchiy-class corvettes (fitted with UKSK VLS tubes during their construction), Yasen-class submarines, modernised Udaloy-class destroyers, and modernised Oscar-class submarines (Project 949AM).

Zircon appears to have been used in a land-attack role during the Russian invasion of Ukraine. In particular, it was used in the attack on Ukraine on February 7, 2024.

On March 25, 2024, Russia struck decision-making centres in the heart of Kyiv with two Zircon missiles. The launches were land-based, from one of two sites in Crimea: the Object 100 missile base or a K-300P Bastion-P transporter erector launcher. According to Russian state media sources, both missiles hit their targets, which were reported to be a SBU headquarters and Zhuliany airport while Ukrainian sources claimed both missiles had been intercepted by air defense systems, and Ukrainian media published photographs purporting to show the remains of an intercepted Zircon. Major Illia Yevlash, a spokesman for the Armed Forces of Ukraine, claimed that Patriot and SAMP/T systems are capable of destroying the Zircon in the terminal phase, when the missile is expected to slow to speeds around Mach 4.5, which Western defense analysts such as former Royal Navy Commander Tom Sharpe and Fabian Hinz agree is likely correct, based on analysis of similar behavior from the Kinzhal missile.

On March 24, 2026, HUR reported that a strike in Crimea had destroyed two Zircon missiles and one Bastion missile launcher, while damaging a second launcher and also killing 7 Russian personnel. Five months later, on August 16, the Ukrainian military claimed a second successful strike against a Bastion launcher complex, also in Crimea, resulting in what UNITED24 Media described as "significant losses in Russian weapons and personnel".

== Export ==
The CEO of the joint Indo-Russian BrahMos programme, Atul Rane, stated in 2022 that a future BrahMos-II missile for India will likely have similar characteristics to the Zircon. According to a report published on April 1, 2023, India has requested Russia to transfer the technology of 3M22.

== Operators ==
- Russian Navy

== See also ==
- Kh-47M2 Kinzhal – Russian nuclear-capable air-launched ballistic missile
- Boeing X-51 Waverider – Uncrewed hypersonic experimental aircraft
- BrahMos-II – Joint Russian-Indian hypersonic cruise missile
- Kh-22 – Soviet anti-ship missile
- Kh-90 – Russian hypersonic cruise missile
- ASN4G – French air-launched nuclear-armed hypersonic cruise missile
