= Sevmash =

Russian shipbuilding company

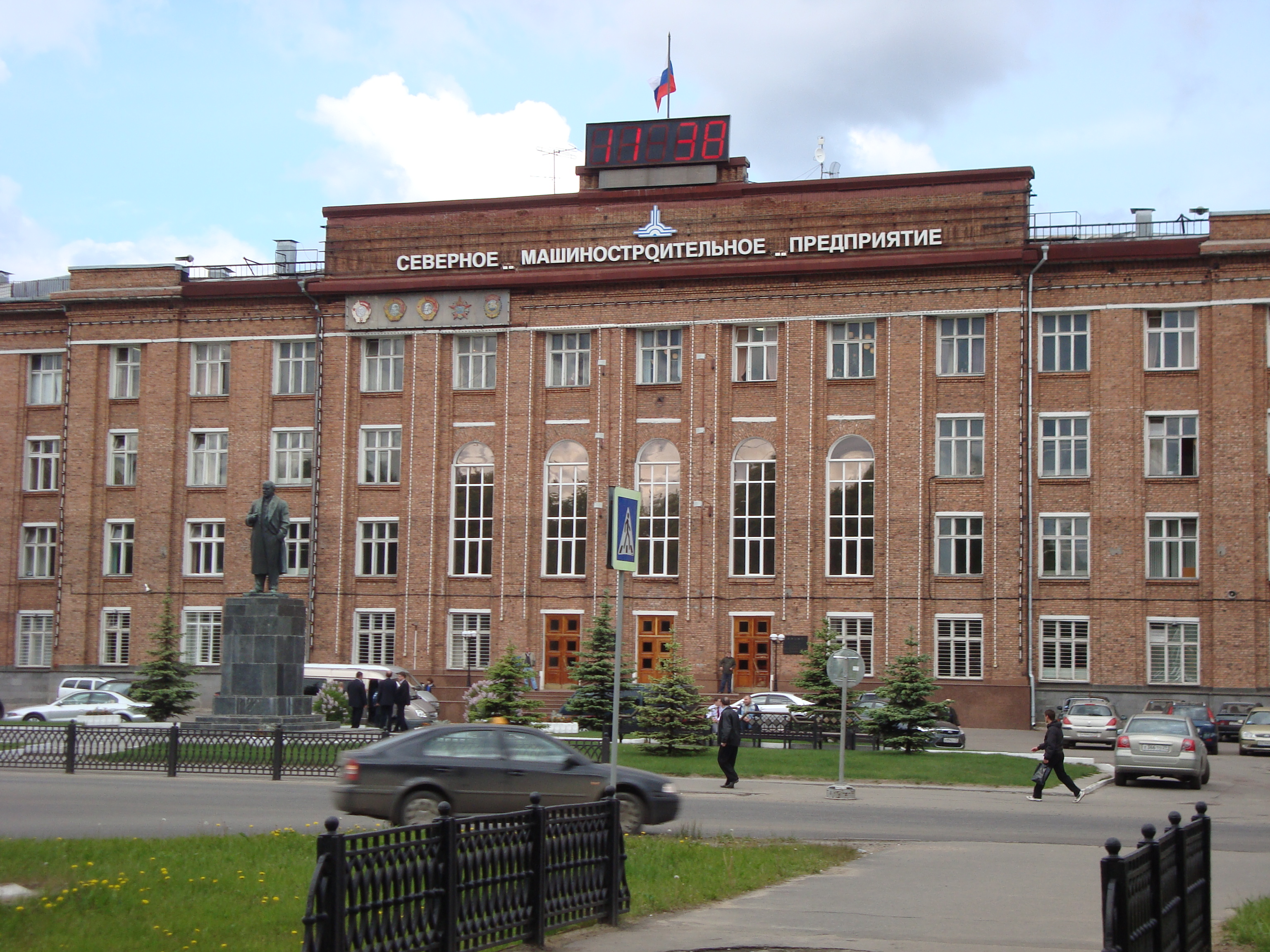
- Factory management building
- Industry: Shipbuilding; Defense industry
- Founded: 21 December 1939
- Headquarters: Severodvinsk, Russia
- Products: Ships, submarines, nuclear submarines, oil platforms, machinery, metallurgy
- Revenue: $1.52 billion (2017)
- Operating income: $139 million (2017)
- Net income: $152 million (2017)
- Total assets: $7.7 billion (2017)
- Total equity: $926 million (2017)
- Number of employees: 30,000 (2020)
- Parent: United Shipbuilding Corporation
- Website: www.sevmash.ru

JSC PO Sevmash (Russian: ОАО «ПО „Севмаш“», Севмаш) is a Russian joint-stock company (JSC) under the vertically-integrated United Shipbuilding Corporation. The shipbuilding operations of Sevmash is in the port city of Severodvinsk on the White Sea in the Russian Federation.

"Sevmash" is an abbreviation of Severnoye Mashinostroitelnoye Predpriyatie (Северное Машиностроительное Предприятие), i.e. "Northern Machine-Building Enterprise". Sevmash is the largest shipbuilding enterprise in Russia and today the country's only nuclear submarine producer. In 2020, the company employed 30,000 people and as of 2009, its revenue from military production was $533.02 million.

== Military production ==
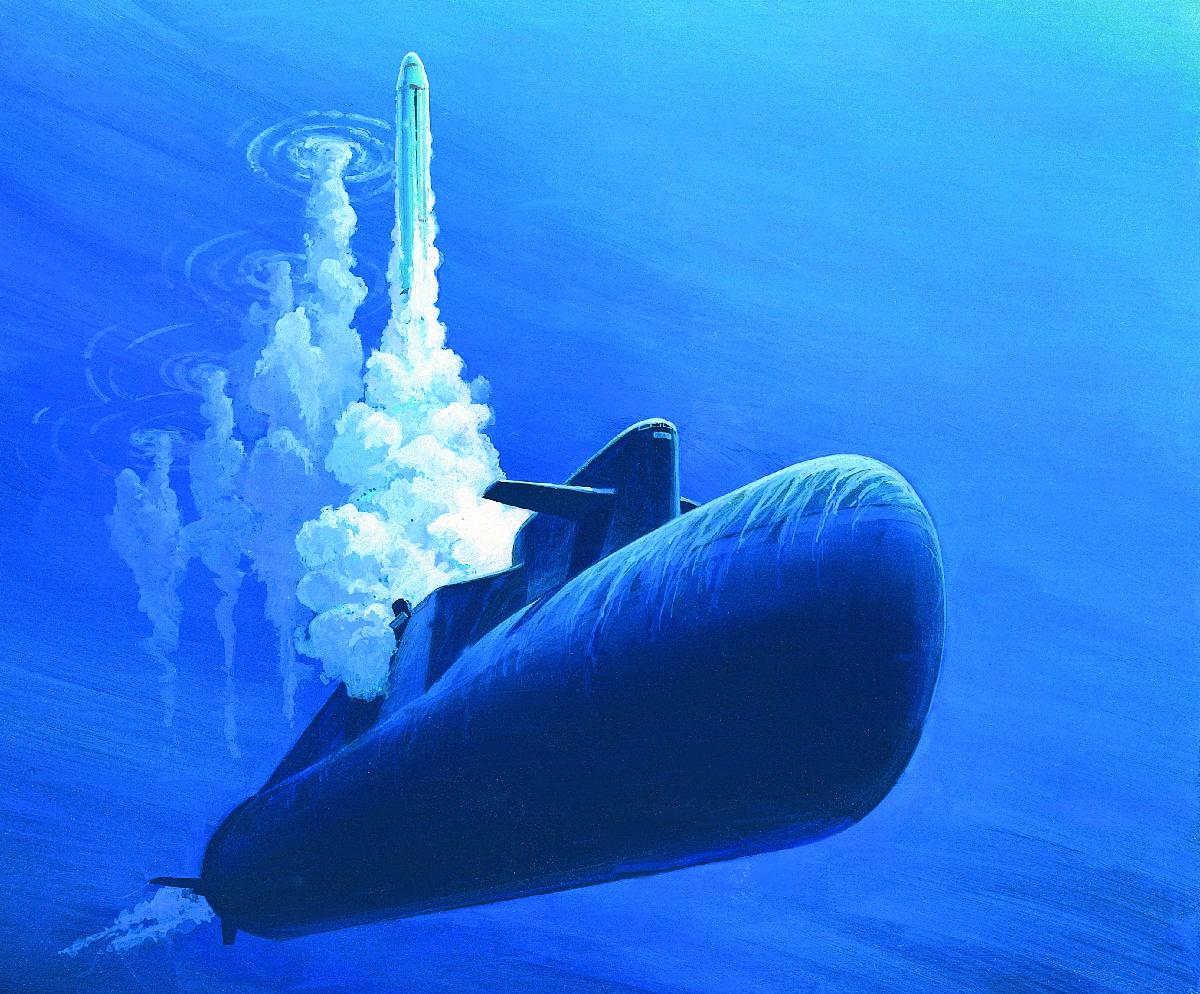
Illustration of a Soviet Delta III nuclear powered ballistic missile submarine firing SS-N-18 missiles

The shipyard's main specialization is manufacturing of ships, submarines and military equipment for the Russian Navy. Sevmash is the only shipyard in Russia producing nuclear submarines. Severodvinsk, the lead vessel of the Yasen-class nuclear-powered cruise missile submarines, was completed in 2010 and commissioned in 2013. The second Borei-class submarine Aleksandr Nevskiy was launched later in 2010 and delivered to the Navy on 23 December 2013, becoming the 130th nuclear-powered submarine produced by Sevmash. The Yasen-class submarine Kazan (commissioned May 2021) and the Borei-class Vladimir Monomakh (commissioned December 2014) were built at the shipyard. In 2003–2005, Sevmash delivered two Project 636 (Kilo class) diesel-electric submarines to foreign customers. As of 2009, the company had an order for a further two Project 636 vessels.

Under a contract for Rosoboronexport, Sevmash conducted repair and modification work on the former Soviet heavy aircraft carrying cruiser Admiral Gorshkov, transforming it into a modern aircraft carrier named INS Vikramaditya for the Indian Navy. The project had been hit by delays and increasing costs, and was finally completed in November 2013.

== Civilian production ==
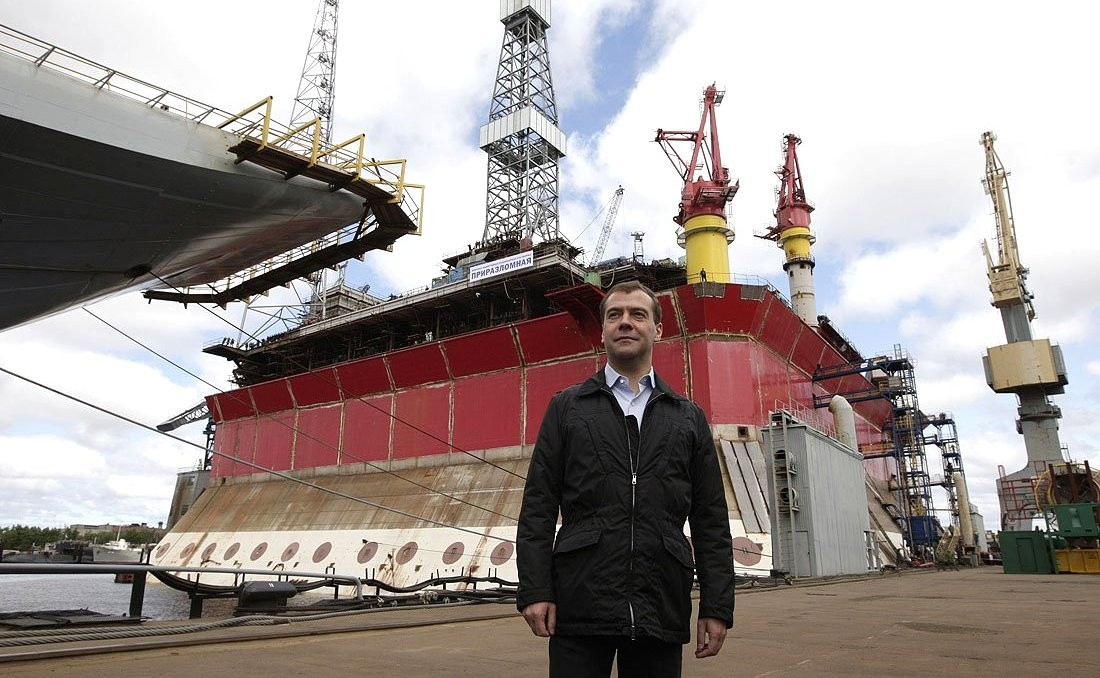
Marine ice-resistant stationary platform

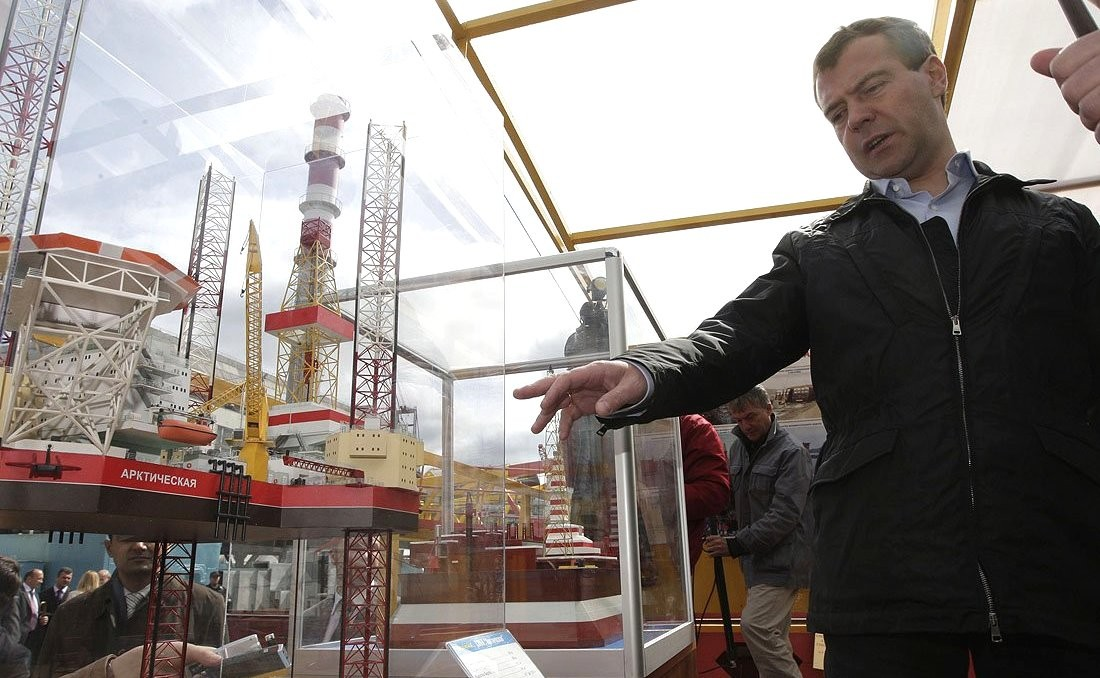
President Dmitry Medvedev with a model of the Shtokman platform in July, 2009

An increasingly important product line for the shipyard is production for oil and gas fields projects on the Arctic shelf, including oil platforms. The Prirazlomnaya ice-resistant stationary platform designed by the Rubin Marine Equipment Design Bureau and built at the shipyard is the first of its kind in Russia. It is due to start operations in the Pechora Sea. Sevmash has also delivered platforms for foreign companies, such as the marine semi-submerged MOSS CS-50 platform for the Norwegian Moss Mosvold Platforms AS company, which was finished in February 2006. Sevmash has received orders for 3 further platforms of this type. Sevmash is also building a platform for the mid-Barents Sea Shtokman gas field.

The enterprise is also engaged in commercial shipbuilding, and has during the last decade built over 100 vessels, including sea and harbor tugs, mini-bulkers, pontoons, barges and fish farms. It also produces metallurgical equipment and rail transportation items.

== Enterprise characteristics ==
Sevmash has a work force of 26,951 people. Based in the city of Severodvinsk in Arkhangelsk Oblast on the White Sea, its facilities occupy an area of more than 300 hectares and it has more than 100 subdivisions. It is the largest shipbuilding enterprise in Russia. Since August, 2007, Sevmash has been headed by Nikolai Yakovlevich Kalistratov.

The company's revenue from military production in 2009 was estimated to be $533.02 million, up from $431.04 million in 2008. Civilian production amounted to 20% of the company's total revenue, and export share of total production was 10%, according to figures published by Centre for Analysis of Strategies and Technologies. The centre ranked Sevmash as the 7th most successful enterprise of the Russian defense industry in 2009, based on a comparison of key financial and operational indicators.

== History ==
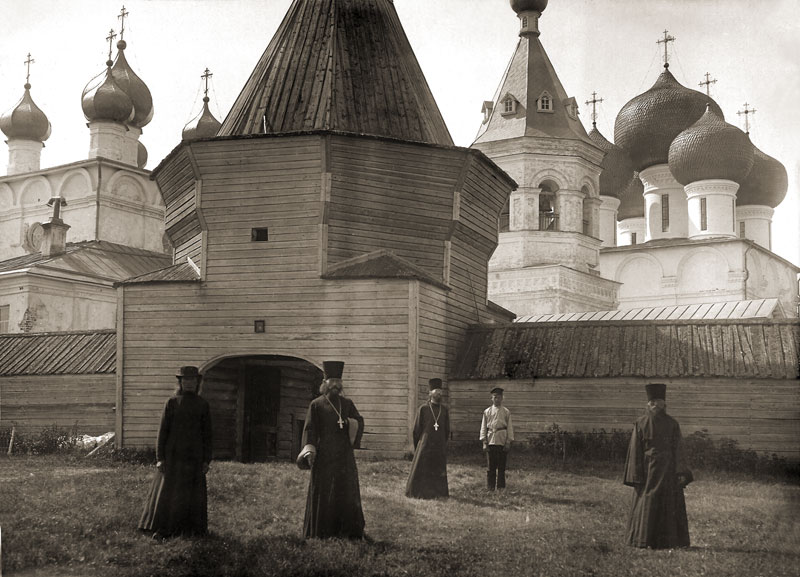
Monastery on site of today's Severodvinsk SEVMASH

The construction of the enterprise had its origins in the first Soviet 5-year plan when the decision was made to significantly expand shipbuilding capacity. The building of what became SEVMASH began in 1936. The shipyard was developed in accordance with resolution of the Council of Labour and Defence under the Council of People's Commissars of the USSR on May 31, 1936 №137-OK for the construction and repair of large warships of different classes. as part of Stalin's industrialization program and a forced labor camp, part of gulag archipelago, was responsible for the initial construction of its facilities along the left bank of the Nikolskiy Estuary at the mouth of the Severnaya Dvina River. The official establishment date is 21 December 1939, when the hull of its first ship, the battleship Sovetskaya Belorussiya was laid down. The enterprise was known in Soviet times as Shipyard Number 402 (Russian: Завод № 402). During World War II, the shipyard was involved in repairing warships and producing turret artillery units and mine-sweeping equipment. Also during the war years the enterprise built large mine hunters, destroyers, diesel-electric submarines, ferries, lighters, floating repair barges, while repairing both Northern Fleet surface ships as well as vessels delivering supplies via the Arctic Convoys. By 1950 the shipyard had repaired 139 ships and vessels. In the early 1950s, large-scale production of submarines was launched. In 1969, the company produced world's first nuclear submarine with a titanium alloy hull, Project 661. In the mid-1970s, its facilities underwent major reconstruction; its industrial capacity was doubled and it had Russia's largest covered slipway installed. The Typhoon class nuclear submarine cruiser Project 941, built in 1981, entered the Guinness World Records as the world's biggest submarine. During its history as of 2009, the company had built 45 surface ships and 163 submarines, including 128 nuclear submarines.

- Enterprise names
  - 2 December 1938 - The director's Directorate of the under construction Shipyard 402 was organized on the order of the USSR Peoples' Commissar for Defense Industry
  - 9 September 1959 - Shipyard 402 transformed into the Northern Machinebuilding Enterprise (SEVMASH) by order of the USSR Minister of Shipbuilding
  - 26 July 1985 - The Northern Machinebuilding Enterprise was transformed into the Production Conglomerate "Northern Machinebuilding Enterprise" (PO SEVMASH) by order of the USSR Minister of Shipbuilding
  - 23 June 1998 - PO SEVMASH was renamed State Unitary Enterprise "PO SEVMASH" (GUP "SEVMASH") by order of the RF Economic Ministry
  - 21 February 2001 - GUP "SEVMASH" renamed Federal State Unitary Enterprise ""PO SEVMASH" (FGUP "PO SEVMASH") by order of the Russian Shipbuilding Agency

== Military production listing ==
- Surface ships
  - 45 units
    - 23 units - Project 122bis
    - 20 units - Project 30, 30K, & 30bis
    - 2 units - Project 68bis
- Submarines
  - 36 diesel-electric submarines
    - 12 Project 611 & AV611 (Zulu class)
    - 16 Project 629 & 629B (Golf class)
    - 2 Project 636 (Kilo class)
    - 1 Project 20120 (Sarov class)
  - 38 first generation nuclear-powered submarines
    - 13 Project 627 & 627A (November class)
    - 8 Project 658 (Hotel class)
    - 1 Project 645
    - 16 Project 675 (Echo II class)
  - 63 second generation nuclear-powered submarines
    - 24 Project 667A & 667AU (Yankee class)
    - 1 Project 661 (Papa class)
    - 10 Project 667B (Delta I class)
    - 4 Project 667BD (Delta II class)
    - 14 Project 667BDR (Delta III class)
    - 3 Project 705K (Alfa class)
    - 7 Project 667BDRM (Delta IV class)
  - 31 third generation nuclear-powered submarines
    - 13 Project 949 & 949A (Oscar I & Oscar II classes)
    - 6 Project 941 (Typhoon class)
    - 1 Project 685 (Mike class)
    - 7 Project 971 (Akula I and Akula II classes)
    - 4 Project 945 & 945A (Sierra I and Sierra II classes)
  - 11 fourth generation nuclear-powered submarines
    - 8 Project 955 (Borei/Dolgorukiy class) delivered, 3 955A under construction
    - 5 Project 885 (three of them are of the project 885M)(Yasen/Severodvinsk class) delivered, 3 885M under construction
