= Futlyar =

- Type: Heavyweight dual-purpose ASW and ASuW torpedo
- Place of origin: Russia

Service history
- In service: 2017
- Used by: Russia

Production history
- Designer: St. Petersburg Research Institute of Marine Engineering
- Manufacturer: Dagdizel

Specifications
- Length: 7.2 m (24 ft)
- Diameter: 533 mm (21.0 in)
- Warhead: High explosive
- Warhead weight: 300 kg
- Detonation mechanism: Proximity or contact detonation
- Engine: gas-turbine with pump-jet
- Propellant: Otto fuel II
- Operational range: 50 km
- Maximum depth: 500 meters
- Maximum speed: 50 kn
- Guidance system: Wire, active and passive acoustic/wake homing
- Launch platform: Submarine

Futlyar (Fizik-2) is a Russian deep-water homing torpedo tested by the Russian Navy in 2017; it entered service in the same year. Developed by the Saint Petersburg Research Institute of Marine Engineering and produced by the Dagdizel Machine-Building Factory, it will replace the UGST (Fizik-1.) Futlyar is a wire-guided, combustion-driven torpedo with a top speed about 50 kn (93 km/h; 58 mph) and a maximum depth capability of more than 500 m (1,600 ft). It would be able to hit targets at a range of about 50 km (27 nmi; 31 mi). It will first equip the new Borei and Yasen classes of nuclear submarines.

== See also ==
- Mark 48
- DM2A4
- Black Shark
- Yu-6
- Varunastra (torpedo)
