= P-800 Oniks =

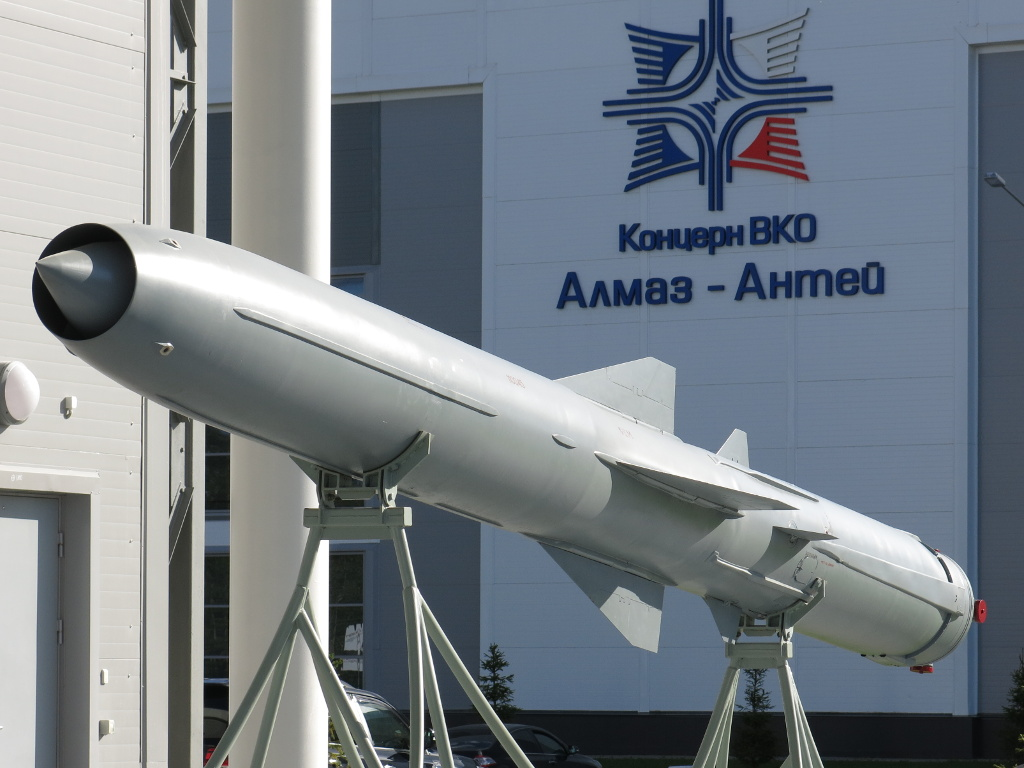
- A P-800 missile at Armia 2018
- Type: Cruise missile Air-launched cruise missile Submarine-launched cruise missile Anti-ship missile Surface-to-surface missile Land-attack missile
- Place of origin: Soviet Union / Russia

Service history
- In service: 2002–present
- Used by: See Operators
- Wars: Syrian Civil War; Russo-Ukrainian war

Production history
- Manufacturer: NPO Mashinostroyeniya
- Unit cost: $1.25 million
- Produced: 1987–present

Specifications
- Mass: 3,000 kg (6,614 lb)
- Length: 8.9 m (29.2 ft)
- Diameter: 0.7 m (2.3 ft)
- Wingspan: 1.7 m (5.6 ft)
- Warhead: national ver. 300 kg semi-armour piercing HE, thermonuclear; for export 200 kg semi-armour piercing HE
- Detonation mechanism: delay fuze
- Engine: Ramjet; 4 tons of thrust
- Propellant: jet fuel
- Operational range: 600 km (370 mi; 320 nmi) (Oniks version for Russia); 800 km (500 mi; 430 nmi) (Oniks-M version for Russia); 120 to 300 km (75 to 186 mi; 65 to 162 nmi) depending on altitude (Yakhont export version)
- Flight ceiling: 14,000 m (46000 ft)
- Flight altitude: 10 meters (32 ft) or higher
- Maximum speed: Mach 2.9 ( 3180 km/h / 1998 mph / 884 m/s )
- Guidance system: midcourse inertial guidance, active radar homing-passive radar seeker head
- Accuracy: 1.5 m
- Launch platform: coastal installations, naval ships, Fixed-wing aircraft

The P-800 Oniks (Russian: П-800 Оникс, lit. 'Onyx'), marketed in export as the Yakhont (Russian: Яхонт; lit. 'ruby'), is a Soviet/Russian supersonic anti-ship cruise missile developed by NPO Mashinostroyeniya as a ramjet version of the P-80 Zubr. Its GRAU designation is 3M55, the air launched Kh-61 variant was planned but never built. The missile has the NATO codename SS-N-26 "Strobile". Development commenced in 1983, and in the 1990s the anti-ship missile was tested on the Project 1234.7 ship. In 2002 the missile passed the whole range of trials and was commissioned. It is reportedly a replacement for the P-270 Moskit, and possibly also of the P-700 Granit.

== Operational history ==
=== Syria ===
In 2010 Sergei Prikhodko, senior adviser to the Russian President, has said that Russia intends to deliver P-800 to Syria based on the contracts signed in 2007. Syria received two Bastion missile systems with 36 missiles each (72 in total). The missiles' test was broadcast by Syrian state TV.

In May 2013, Russia continued the contract delivery to the Syrian government supplying missiles with an advanced radar to make them more effective to counter any future foreign military invasion. A warehouse containing the Bastion missiles was destroyed by an Israeli air strike on Latakia on 5 July 2013, but US intelligence analysts believe that some missiles had been removed before the attack.

Oniks missiles were reportedly used in 2016 against ISIL targets.

=== Russian invasion of Ukraine ===
The P-800 was used in the Russo-Ukrainian War. The Russian Defense Ministry announced that it had used the missile on 1 May 2022; reportedly a number of Oniks missiles were used to destroy military equipment around the city of Odesa. On 9 May 2022 Russian missile forces in Crimea launched 4 Onyx missiles on Odesa. Russian MOD reported that their forces attacked Ukrainian helicopters located in Artsyz in the Odessa region. One Ukrainian Mi-24 helicopter was destroyed in the ground and one person was killed.

Ukrainian Air Force Spokesperson Yurii Ihnat mentioned that the flight profile of the missile is of particular concern: "Onyx missiles are designed to destroy watercraft, and ships, it flies at a speed of 3000 km per hour, that is, very fast,... On the march [cruising], it can rise high, and when entering the target, it can actually fly 10–15 meters above the water to destroy the ship." He concluded that it was "impossible" to shoot them down with available anti-air means, but he mentioned that some success was found when using electronic warfare against them; he mentioned that a missile attack on 23 September 2023 missed a military target and destroyed a "recreational area", adding that "something affected its flight."

Russian sources reported on 27 March 2024 that the missile received a new active homing head in order to hit ground targets more precisely.

On 20 August 2024, at the Congress of Local and Regional Authorities, Commander-in-Chief of the Armed Forces of Ukraine Oleksandr Syrskyi for the first time announced data on how many weapons Russia has used since 2022, as well as how many were intercepted. The report said that only 12/211 (5.69%) of Onyx were intercepted by Ukraine's air defense

== Specifications ==
Kalibr and Oniks cruise missiles hit targets in Syria, November 2016. The ship fired missiles are Kalibrs, and the TEL-launched missiles are Oniks, fired from Bastion coastal defense platforms.

- Length: 8.9 m
- Diameter: 0.7 m
- Wingspan: 1.7 m
- Weight: 3,100 kg
- Speed at altitude: 750 m/s (Mach 2.6)
- Surface speed: Mach 2
- Engine: ramjet, weight 200 kg, 4 tons of thrust
- Range: 120–300 km / 600 km for Russian ship/sub deployed non-export model
- for the combined trajectory (hi-lo) – 300 km
- for low-altitude trajectory (lo-lo) – 120 km
- Flight altitude of 10,000–14,000 m
- Warhead: national version: 300 kg semi-armour piercing HE, thermonuclear; export version: 200 kg HE
- Fuel: jet fuel T-6

Radar homing head

- all-weather monopulse active-passive, with frequency hopping
- Immunity: high, from active spoofing, dipole clouds
- Range: 50 km active
- Launchable sea state – up to 7 points
- Warm-up time from power on: no more than 2 min
- Current consumption at 27 V circuit: up to 38 A
- Maximum angle of the target search: ± 45 °
- Homing weight: 85 kg

== Variants ==
- 3M55 Oniks – Base version for Russia.
- P-800 Yakhont – Export version of Oniks.
- P-800 Yashma - Submarine-launched version of Yakhont.
- BrahMos – Co-developed with India, through BrahMos Aerospace Private Limited, since 1998.
- Bastion-P – Coast mobile missile system. Officially entered service in 2015.
- Kh-61 - Air launched air to surface version.
- Oniks-M - version of Oniks with improved range (up to 800 km), accuracy and ECCM capabilities.

== Platforms ==
=== Naval ===
Current

- project 11661K Gepard-class frigate Dagestan,
- project 22350 class Admiral Gorshkov-class frigate,
- project 11356 Admiral Grigorovich-class frigate
- modernized Udaloy-class destroyer Marshal Shaposhnikov
- modernized Kirov-class battlecruiser Admiral Nakhimov
- project 21631 Buyan-M-class corvette
- project 22800 Karakurt-class corvette
- project 20385 Gremyashchiy-class corvette
- Steregushchiy-class corvette (export version)
- Ahmad Yani-class frigate
- Yasen-class submarine

=== Aerial ===
Sukhoi Su-35

Sukhoi Su-34

Future

- Kuznetsov-class aircraft carrier
- Kirov-class battlecruiser
- Lider-class destroyer
- Oscar-class submarine

=== Land ===
Standard batteries of the K-300 Bastion-P (Бастион-П-Подвижный):

- 4 self-propelled launchers K-340P with 2 "Yakhont" missiles (crew of 3 persons)
- 1–2 Command and Control vehicles (ASBU) PBRK (crew of 5 persons)
- 1 security alert car (MOBD)
- 4 Transportation and loading vehicles (TLV K342P)

== Operators ==
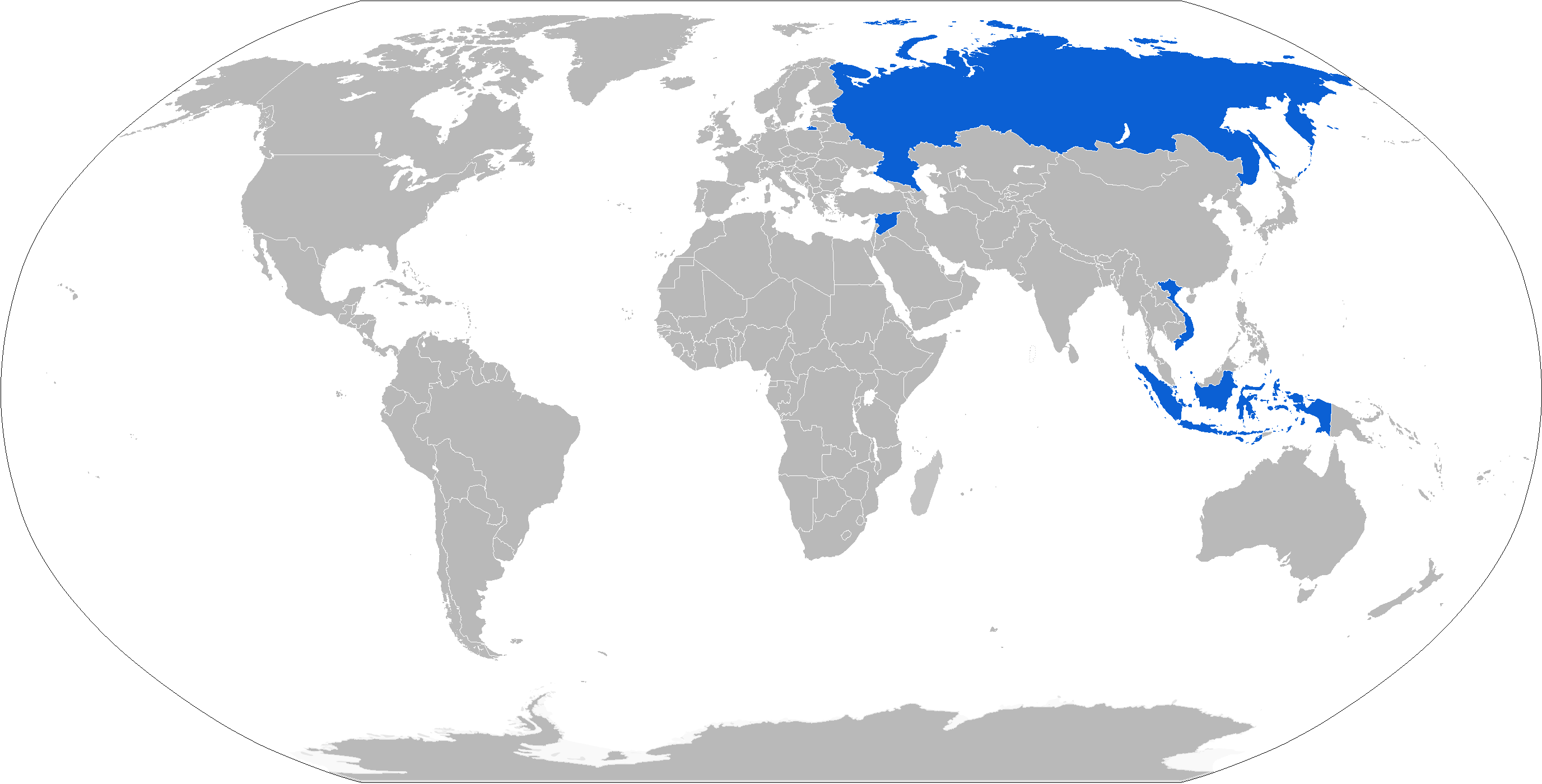
Map with P-800 operators in blue

- Hezbollah – 12 missiles with diverse launching platforms. However, reports suggest that Hezbollah does not have the means to launch the missile without Iranian and/or Syrian support.
- Indonesia – 4 VLS (vertical launching system) mounted on Ahmad Yani-class frigate KRI Oswald Siahaan (354).
- Russia – 3 "Bastion-P" complexes delivered in 2010, all the complexes taken into service with the Russian Black Sea Fleet's 11th Independent Coastal Missile-Artillery Brigade stationed near Anapa and the Project 1234.7 Nakat, a one-off Nanuchka IV-class corvette commissioned in 1987 with 2x6 Oniks. The "Bastion-P" is deployed by Russian forces in Crimea. One more Bastion-P was delivered in 2015. 2 Bastion systems are in service with the Northern Fleet and at least one with Western Military District (Baltic Fleet). Newest class of Russian nuclear-powered attack submarines, Yasen-class submarine, can also launch the missile. Submarine-launched variant entered service in 2016. Two Bastion missile systems delivered in 2017 and one more in 2018. Totally 4 Bal and Bastion systems in 2018. One more system delivered for the Pacific Fleet in early 2019. Totally 3 Bastion systems and 55 Oniks were delivered in 2019. The Russian Defense Ministry concluded a contract at the Army-2020 forum for purchasing cruise missiles 3M55N Oniks. 3 more delivered during 2021.
- Syria – 4 "Bastion-P" complexes delivered in 2011, 72 missiles.
- Vietnam – at least 2 "Bastion-P" land-based coastal defense systems delivered with at least 40 missiles.

== See also ==
- 3M-54 Kalibr – (Russia)
- 3M-51 Alfa – (Russia)
- BrahMos – (India, Russia)
