= List of Russian Navy cruisers =

Currently, only the navies of Russia and the United States operate modern vessels classified as cruisers. Russia currently has seven, one (Kirov-class battlecruiser Admiral Lazarev) is afloat but has been inoperative for years and another that only nominally in commission and has not put to sea since 1991 (Kirov-class battlecruiser Admiral Ushakov). The fourth Slava class, (Slava-class Admiral Lobov), is owned by Ukraine and remains uncompleted at its construction shipyard.

== Kirov class ==
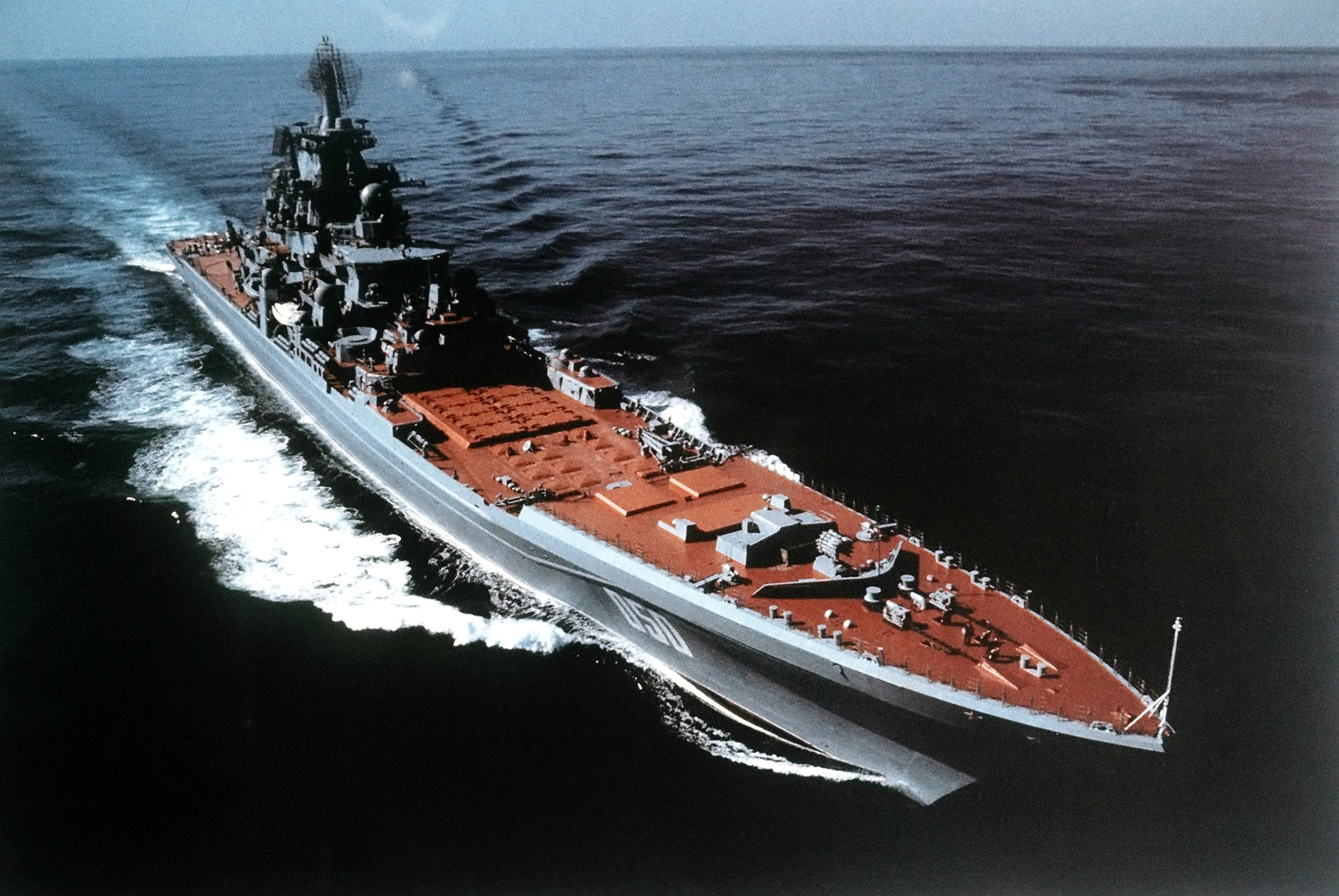
Kirov class (most likely Admiral Lazarev).

The vessels of the Kirov class are the world's largest cruisers, and for this reason they are generally referred to as battlecruisers. Two Kirov battlecruisers are currently in service, Admiral Nakhimov and Pyotr Velikiy. In the last six years, Pyotr Velikiy has participated in numerous military exercises, with President Vladimir Putin being on board during the last one. The older Admiral Nakhimov was repaired and returned to service in 2005; the ship is currently undergoing upgrade renovations and should return to active service in the late 2010s.

Kirov-class battlecruisers are outfitted with a very large number of weapons systems as well as modern electrical equipment, and are fully capable of fighting a large number of sea-, subsea-, air- and land-based enemy targets.

=== Laid up, written off ===
- Admiral Lazarev
- Admiral Ushakov

=== In service ===
- Admiral Nakhimov

=== In service ===
- Pyotr Velikiy

== Slava class ==
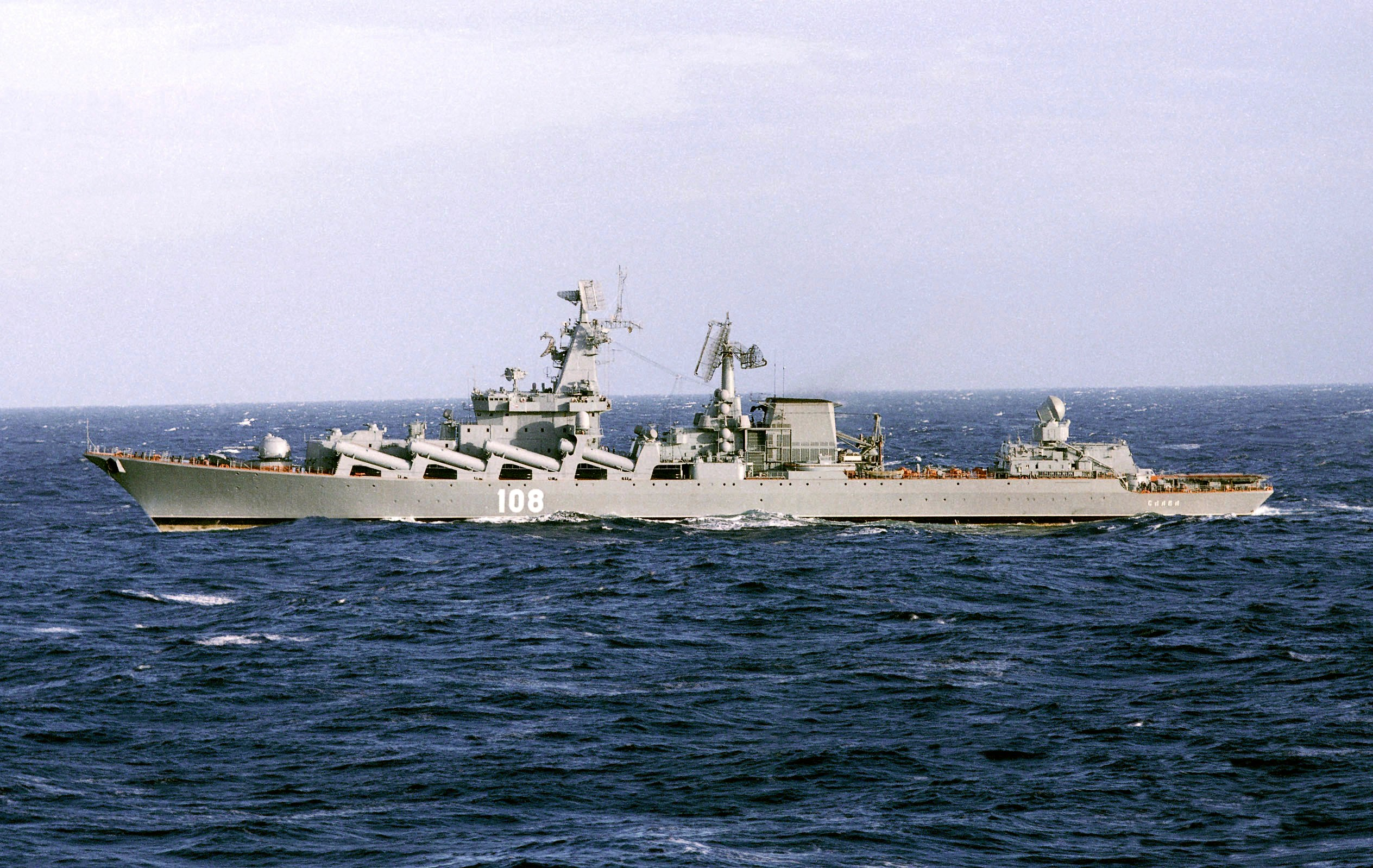
Slava class

The Slava class was designed as a less radical back-up to the aforementioned Kirovs, providing most of the facilities of the larger ships in a considerably smaller, gas turbine-powered hull. The main armament is made up of sixteen SS-N-12 "Sandbox" launchers, mounted in eight pairs on either side of the forward superstructure. These launchers are fixed at an angle of some 15°. Over-the-horizon targeting for SS-N-12 systems is provided by helicopter or Punch Bowl Satcom.

The Slava class was designed as part of a new strategy of creating bastions for ballistic missile submarines. Project 1143 and 1164 ships were to protect these bastions, and the new SS-N-12 missile was designed to strike major enemy anti-submarine warfare units.

One of the other major roles of this cruiser type is to hunt down and destroy enemy aircraft carriers, and other heavy ships. Her SA-N-6 Grumble long-range SAMs can defend an entire strike group against enemy aircraft and missiles.

=== Uncompleted ===
- Admiral Lobov - owned by Ukraine

=== In service ===
- Marshal Ustinov
- Varyag

=== Sunk ===
- Moskva

== Kuznetsov class ==
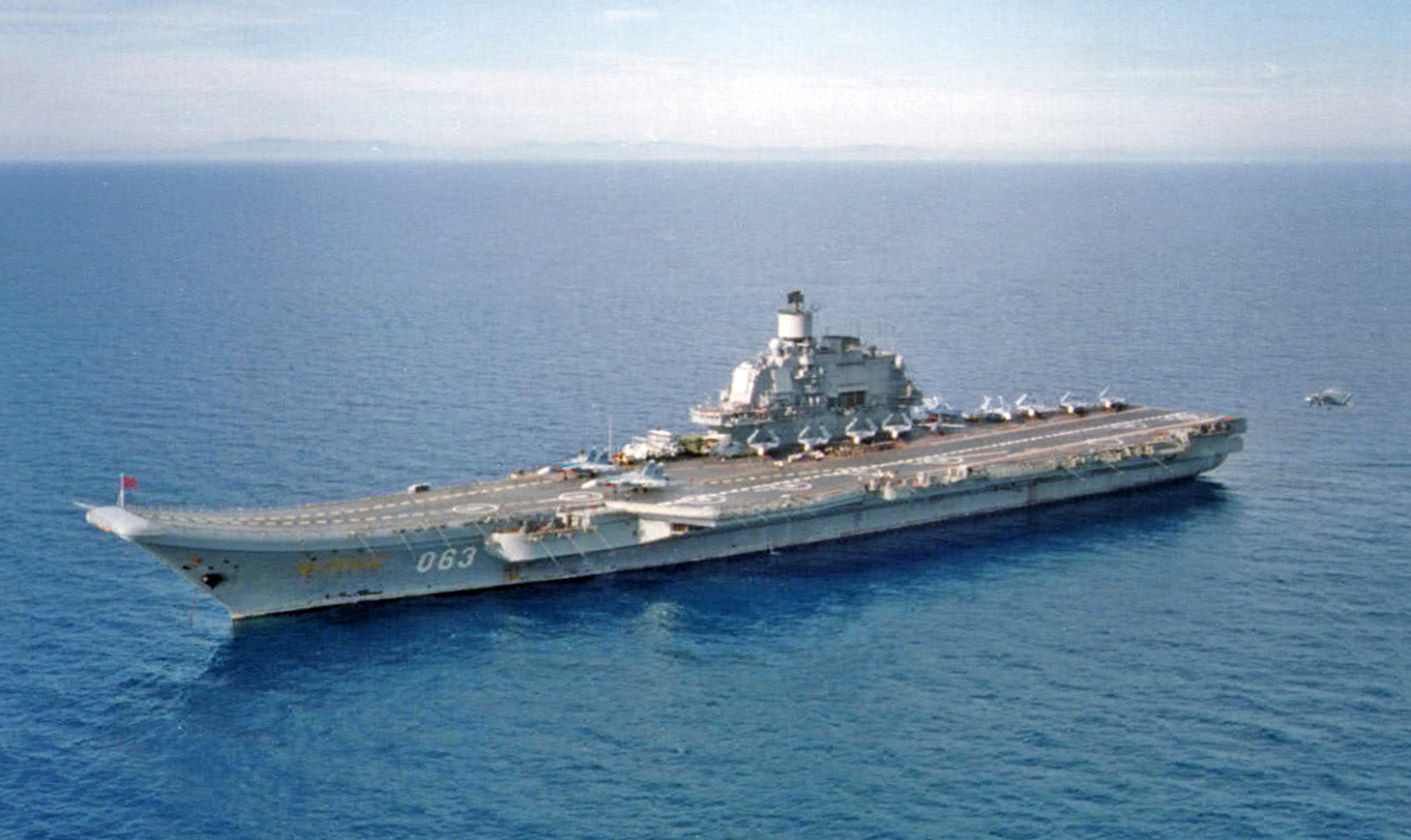
Kuznetsov class

Kuznetsov-class aircraft carriers are designated as heavy aircraft-carrying cruisers by the Russian Navy because their main strike armament is long-range anti-ship cruise missiles and the air wing is intended for defensive purposes. The flight deck area of the class is 14,700 square metres (158,000 sq ft), and aircraft takeoff is assisted by a bow ski jump angled at 12° in lieu of steam catapults. Two starboard lifts carry aircraft from the hangar to the flight deck. The ship was designed with the capacity to support 16 Yakovlev Yak-41M (which was cancelled) and 12 Sukhoi Su-27K fixed-wing aircraft and a range of Kamov Ka-27 helicopters. The ship has a Granit anti-ship missile system equipped with 12 surface-to-surface missile launchers. The air defence gun and missile system includes the Klinok / SA-N-9 Gauntlet air defence missile system with 24 vertical launchers and 192 surface-to-air missiles, plus 8 CADS-N-1 Kashtan CIWS mounts. The system defends the ship against anti-ship missiles, aircraft, unmanned aerial vehicles and surface ships. The ship is also equipped with an UDAV-1 integrated anti-submarine system with 60 anti-submarine missiles.

Currently, the only ship ever commissioned in the class, the Kuznetsov, operates 24 Sukhoi Su-33, unknown numbers of Sukhoi Su-25UTG and 24 Kamov Ka-27 helicopters for use in various roles, such as long range radar, anti-submarine and other uses.

=== In service ===
- Admiral Kuznetsov
