= Russian Navy =

Naval arm of the Russian Armed Forces

- Военно-морской флот Российской Федерации; Voyenno-morskoy flot Rossiyskoy Federatsii
- Emblem of the Russian Navy
- Active: 1696–1917; 1992–present
- Country: Russia
- Branch: Navy
- Size: 160,000 active duty (2023) c. 295+ warships (surface combatants, amphibious ships & submarines) & numerous auxiliaries
- Part of: Armed Forces of the Russian Federation
- Headquarters: Admiralty building, Saint Petersburg
- Mottos: "С нами Бог и Андреевский флаг!" (God and St. Andrew's flag are with us!)
- March: Quick – "Экипаж—одна семья" (English: The Crew—One Family); Slow – "Гвардейский встречный марш Военно-морского флота" (English: Slow March of the Guards of the Navy)
- Anniversaries: Navy Day (last Sunday in July); Submariner's Day (19 March); Surface Sailor's Day (20 October)
- Fleet: c. 66 submarines; c. 230 surface warships; plus numerous auxiliaries See: List of active Russian Navy ships
- Engagements: Since 1991: Russo-Georgian War; Anti-piracy operation in Gulf of Aden; Russo-Ukrainian War; Annexation of Crimea; Russo-Ukrainian war (2022–present); Syrian Civil War
- Website: structure.mil.ru/structure/forces/navy.htm

Commanders
- Supreme Commander-in-Chief: President Vladimir Putin
- Minister of Defense: Andrey Belousov
- Commander-in-Chief: Admiral of the Fleet Aleksandr Moiseyev
- Chief of the Main Staff: Admiral Vladimir Kasatonov

Insignia
- Ensign

- Jack

- Pennant

- Patch

- Great Emblem

- Insignia

The Russian Navy (Note: Russian: Военно-морской флот (ВМФ), romanized: Voyenno-morskoi flot (VMF), lit. 'Military Maritime Fleet') is the naval arm of the Russian Armed Forces. It has existed in various forms since 1696. Its present iteration was formed in January 1992 when it succeeded the Navy of the Commonwealth of Independent States (which had itself succeeded the Soviet Navy following the dissolution of the Soviet Union in late December 1991).

The Imperial Russian Navy was established by Peter the Great (Peter I) in October 1696. The symbols of the Russian Navy, the St. Andrew's ensign, and most of its traditions were established personally by Peter I.

The Russian Navy possesses the vast majority of the former Soviet naval forces, and currently comprises the Northern Fleet, the Pacific Fleet, the Black Sea Fleet, the Baltic Fleet, the Caspian Flotilla, the permanent task force in the Mediterranean, Naval Aviation, and the Coastal Troops (consisting of the Naval Infantry and the Coastal Missile and Artillery Troops).

The Russian Navy suffered severely with the collapse of the Soviet Union due to insufficient maintenance, lack of funding, and subsequent effects on the training of personnel and timely replacement of equipment. Another setback was attributed to Russia's domestic shipbuilding industry, which was in decline due to the absence of modern hardware and technology.

In 2013, a rise in gas and oil prices enabled a sort of renaissance of the Russian Navy due to increased available funds, which may have allowed Russia to begin "developing the capacity to modernize". In August 2014, Defence Minister Sergei Shoigu said that Russian naval capabilities would be bolstered with new weapons and equipment within the next six years in response to the enlargement of NATO and the beginning of the Russo-Ukrainian War. Following the full-scale 2022 Russian invasion of Ukraine, the Russian Navy has lost several ships, including the cruiser Moskva, flagship of the Black Sea Fleet.

As of September 2024 the Russia's only aircraft carrier, Admiral Kuznetsov, is non-operational, with reports indicating that the carrier's crew of approximately 1,500 was reassigned to the Russian Army for combat duty in Ukraine. This suggests that, for the moment, there is no plan to make the Russian Navy a carrier navy once again.

== History ==
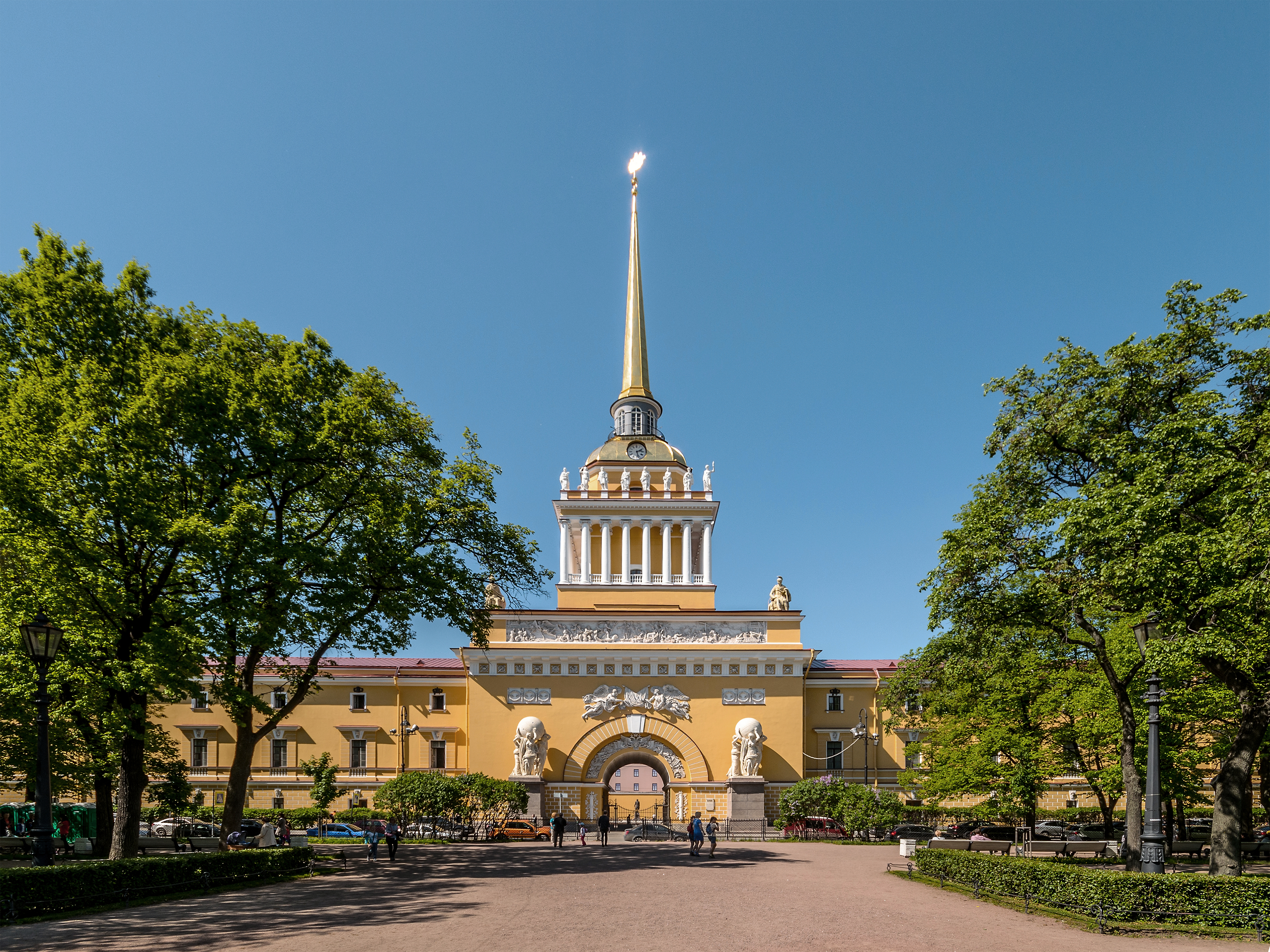
The Russian Admiralty in St. Petersburg is famed for its gilded steeple topped by a golden weather-vane in the shape of a sailing ship.

The 1991 dissolution of the Soviet Union led to a severe decline in the Russian Navy. Defence expenditures were severely reduced. Many ships were scrapped or laid up as accommodation ships at naval bases, and the building program was essentially stopped. Sergey Gorshkov's buildup during the Soviet period had emphasised ships over support facilities, but Gorshkov had also retained ships in service beyond their effective lifetimes, so a reduction had been inevitable in any event. The situation was exacerbated by the impractical range of vessel types which the Soviet military-industrial complex, with the support of the leadership, had forced on the navy—taking modifications into account, the Soviet Navy in the mid-1980s had nearly 250 different classes of ship.

The Kiev-class aircraft carrying cruisers and many other ships were prematurely retired, and the incomplete second Admiral Kuznetsov-class aircraft carrier Varyag was eventually sold to the People's Republic of China by Ukraine. Funds were only allocated for the completion of ships ordered prior to the collapse of the USSR, as well as for refits and repairs on fleet ships taken out of service since. However, the construction times for these ships tended to stretch out extensively: in 2003 it was reported that the Akula-class submarine Nerpa had been under construction for fifteen years.

Storage of decommissioned nuclear submarines in ports near Murmansk became a significant issue, with the Bellona Foundation reporting details of lowered readiness. Naval support bases outside Russia, such as Cam Ranh Bay in Vietnam, were gradually closed, with the exception of the modest technical support base in Tartus, Syria to support ships deployed to the Mediterranean. Naval Aviation declined as well from its height as Soviet Naval Aviation, dropping from an estimated 60,000 personnel with some 1,100 combat aircraft in 1992 to 35,000 personnel with around 270 combat aircraft in 2006. In 2002, out of 584 naval aviation crews only 156 were combat ready, and 77 ready for night flying. Average annual flying time was 21.7 hours, compared to 24 hours in 1999.

Training and readiness also suffered severely. In 1995, only two missile submarines at a time were being maintained on station, from the Northern and Pacific Fleets. The decline culminated in the loss of the Oscar II-class submarine Kursk during the Northern Fleet summer exercise that was intended to back up the publication of a new naval doctrine.

As of February 2008, the Russian Navy had 44 nuclear submarines with 24 operational; 19 diesel-electric submarines, 16 operational; and 56 first and second rank surface combatants, 37 operational. Despite this improvement, the November 2008 accident on board the Akula-class submarine attack boat Nerpa during sea trials before lease to India represented a concern for the future.

The strength and quality of the Russian Navy started to improve during the 2010s. From 2010-2014 Russian officials negotiated the purchase of four Mistral-class landing helicopter docks. On 3 September 2014, French President announced that due to Russia's "recent actions in Ukraine", the two ships would not be delivered. In November 2014, François Hollande placed a hold on the delivery of the first Mistral to Russia in view of the conflict in east Ukraine. Hollande set two conditions for delivery: the observation of a ceasefire in Ukraine and a political agreement between Moscow and Kiev. On 5 August 2015 it was announced that France was to pay back Russia's partial payments and keep the two ships initially produced for Russia. The ships eventually were sold to Egypt.

In 2012, as part of an ambitious rebuilding effort, President Vladimir Putin announced a plan to build 51 modern ships and 24 submarines by 2020. Of the 24 submarines, 16 were to be nuclear-powered. On 10 January 2013, the Russian Navy finally accepted its first new Borei-class SSBN (Yury Dolgorukiy) for service. A second Borei (Aleksandr Nevskiy) was undergoing sea trials and entered service on 21 December 2013.

A third Borei-class boat (Vladimir Monomakh) was launched and began trials in early 2013, and was commissioned in late 2014. As of early 2025, eight Borei-class boats are in service, along with five Yasen-class nuclear attack/cruise missile submarines. More vessels of these classes are building along with additional Lada and Improved-Kilo-class conventional attack submarines. The surface fleet is also being modernized, principally by introducing at least six new classes of corvette/offshore patrol vessels, a new class of frigate (the Admiral Gorshkov class), as well as new classes of amphibious ships and support vessels. In 2019, total tonnage of the Russian Navy stood at 1,216,547 tonnes.

On 31 July 2022 during Russian Navy Day, Putin approved a new maritime doctrine for Russia. The new doctrine suggests an increased state focus on the Arctic and the Northern Sea Route, as well as an increased naval presence in the Mediterranean and Red Seas, both using already-established bases and establishing new bases on other territories in the area. Plans for the development of shipbuilding industries in Crimea were also mentioned, as well as the development of new LNG terminals and shipbuilding industries in the Far East. With the US and Allies identified as the major maritime threat, cooperation with India and Middle Eastern allies was also emphasised, as well as the necessity for increased foreign port visits by Russian Navy vessels. In 2023, Russian state media claimed that the Russian Navy received 3 submarines, 7 surface ships (including a modernized one), 33 multipurpose, raid and support vessels, 11 aircraft and helicopters, and also over 7,700 cruise, anti-ship and anti-submarine missiles.

=== Invasion of Ukraine and losses ===
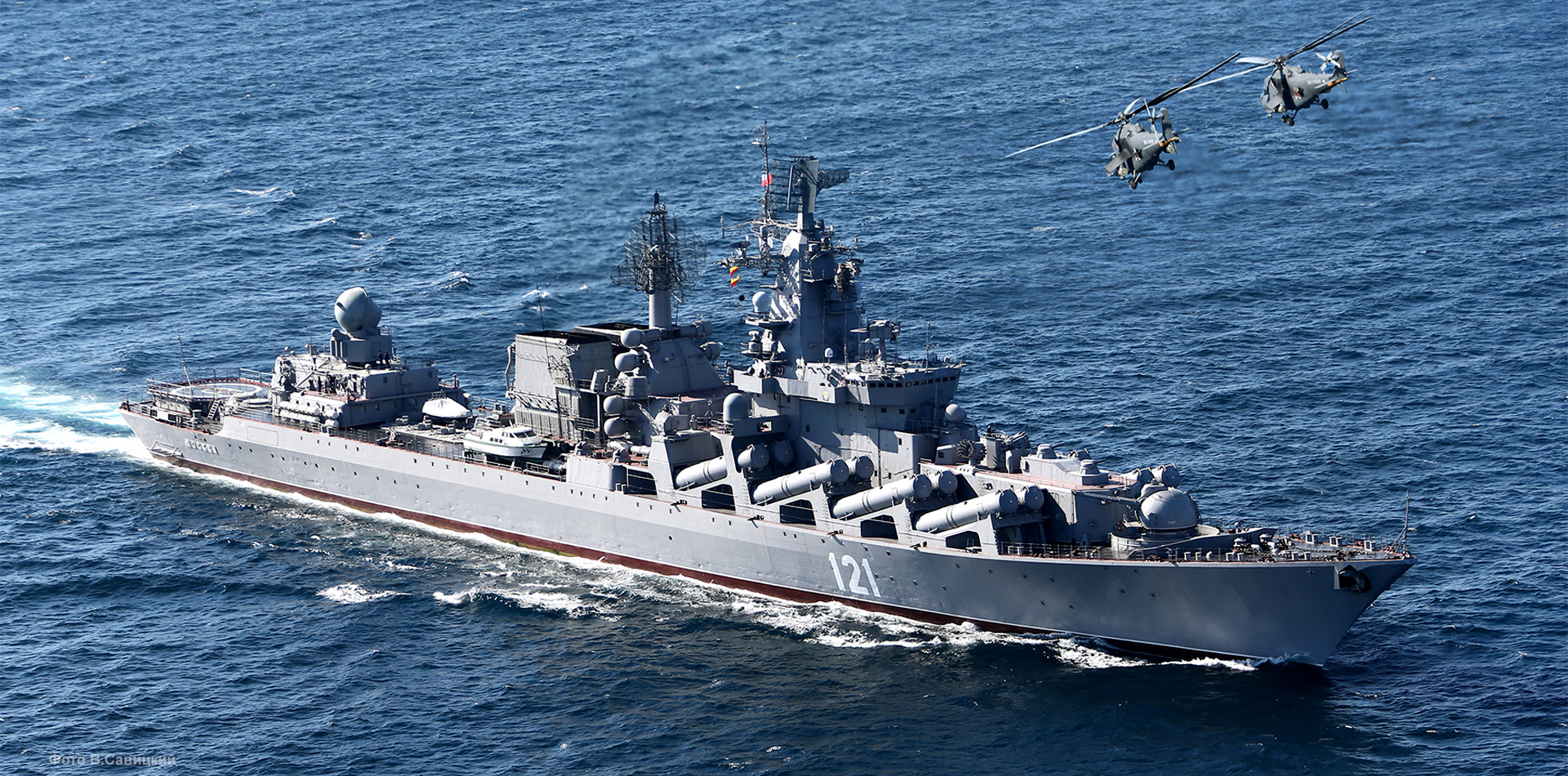
Slava-class cruiser Moskva, sunk in the Russian invasion of Ukraine

In 2022, the Russian Navy took part in the Russian invasion of Ukraine, starting with the attack on Snake Island at the beginning of the war, at which the Ukrainian defenders told the Russian cruiser Moskva, flagship of the Black Sea; "Russian warship, go fuck yourself", before subsequently being captured by Russian forces. Moskva sank on 14 April 2022 after a fire broke out and forced the crew to evacuate. The Ukrainian military reported that they hit the ship with Neptune anti-ship missiles, however the Russian military did not confirm this. The ship subsequently capsized and sank while the Russian Navy was attempting to tow her into port. The sinking of Moskva is the most significant Russian naval loss in action since World War II. In December 2023, the Russian landing ship Novocherkassk was also destroyed after being hit by Ukrainian cruise missiles.

On 31 January 2024, Ukrainian sea drones struck the Russian Tarantul-class corvette Ivanovets in the Black Sea, causing the ship to sink. Two weeks later on 14 February, the same type of Ukrainian sea drones struck and sank the Russian Landing ship Tsezar Kunikov. On 5 March, the patrol boat Sergei Kotov was also lost to sea drones. While precise information on Russian ship losses during the war are not available, the fleet has lost at least four major warships (with others damaged), three major amphibious ships (with others damaged) and one submarine (Rostov-na-Donu), which was either seriously damaged or possibly destroyed while in dry dock. The fleet has continued to operate and attempted to adjust to Ukrainian tactics by integrating new defensive systems in ships and by redeploying vessels to the eastern Black Sea, or out of the region entirely, until sufficiently upgraded. By early 2026, it was reported that, despite no longer having a navy, Ukraine's surface, sub-surface and aerial drone capabilities had effectively driven the Russian fleet from open waters, forcing it to seek shelter in ports on the eastern Black Sea that themselves were no longer fully secure.

== Structure ==
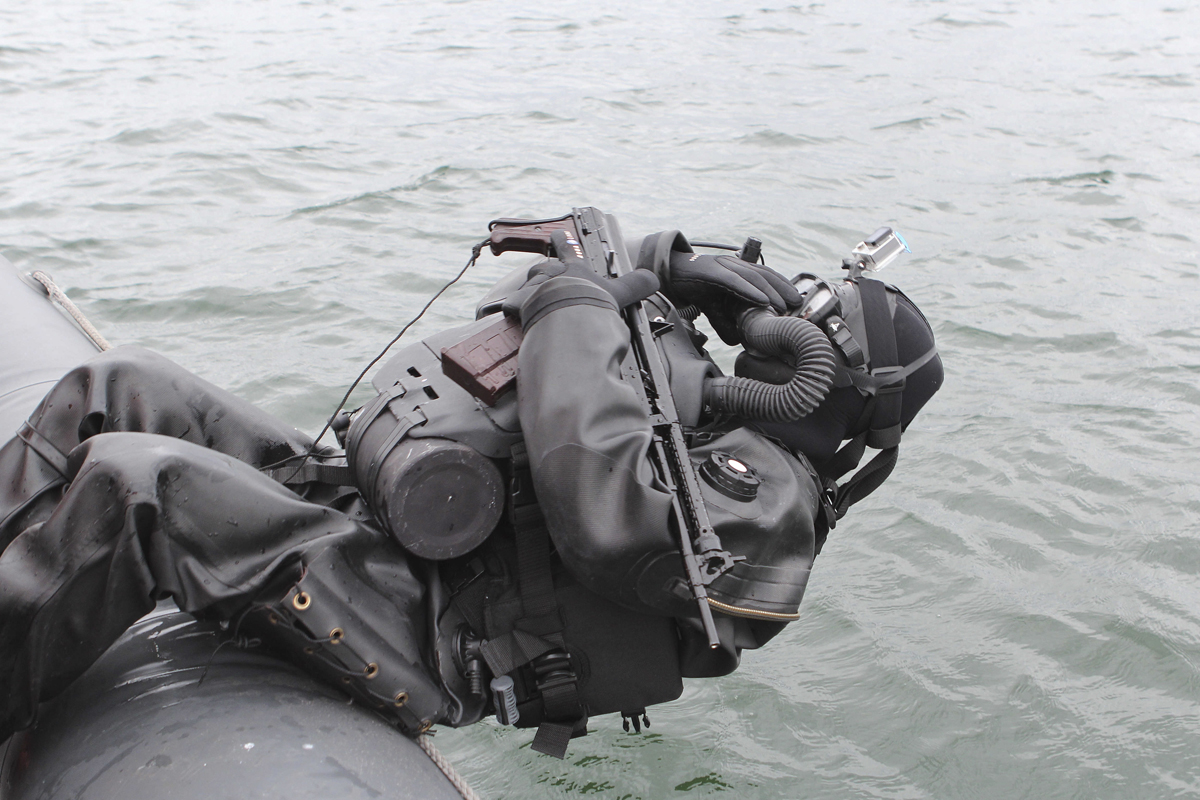
A Naval Spetsnaz frogman

Since 2012 the headquarters of the Russian Navy (Russian Navy Main Staff) is once again located in The Admiralty in Saint Petersburg. Russian naval manpower is a mixture of conscripts serving one-year terms and volunteers (Officers and Ratings). In 2006 the IISS assessed there were 142,000 personnel in the Russian Navy. This personnel number includes the Naval Infantry (Marines) and the Coastal Missile and Artillery Troops. As of 2008 the conscription term was reduced to one year and a major downsizing and reorganization were underway. In 2008, plans were announced to move the headquarters to the Admiralty building in St. Petersburg, the historic location of the headquarters of the Imperial Russian Navy. The Navy Staff finally relocated there in November 2012.

The Russian Navy is organised into four combat services - the Surface Forces, the Submarine Forces, the Naval Aviation and the Coastal Troops. Additionally the navy also includes support units afloat and ashore. It does not include special forces. The Naval Spetsnaz brigades are part of the Main Intelligence Directorate attached to the respective fleets and the Counter-Diversionary Forces and Assets (ПДСС) (which are units, protecting the Navy from incursions of enemy special forces) fall within the Coastal Forces.

During the Cold War the Soviet Armed Forces made the distinction between the various naval commands. The main fleets were the Northern and the Pacific Fleet. They were tasked with independent operations on the high seas and for that reason included strategic surface, submarine and air forces, including the country's naval nuclear deterrent. Due to the limited geography of the Baltic and the Black Seas the respective Baltic and Black Sea Fleets were given a more circumscribed role in support of adjacent ground formation (the Main Command of the Troops of the Western Direction in Legnica (Poland) and the Main Command of the Troops of the South-Western Direction in Chișinău).

These two fleets were armed with shorter-range weapon systems than the main fleets (diesel-electric submarines, Sukhoi Su-24 fighter-bombers and a larger quantity of frigates and corvettes). Due to the closed nature of the Caspian Sea (still connected to the Baltic and Black Seas through the Volga River and the system of rivers and canals and navigable for ships of corvette size) its Caspian Flotilla had an even more limited role than the Fleets and played a defensive role supporting the Main Command of the Troops of the Southern Direction in Baku.

With the end of the Cold War a significant reduction in forces followed. Before the 2008 Russian military reform, the four fleets were ranked as equal in status to the six Military Districts. With the reform measures going into force the number of Military Districts was reduced and became new Joint Strategic Commands and the four fleets and one flotilla were subordinated to them with status equal to the Ground Forces and the Air Forces armies. Due to Russia's increased interests in the Arctic region and the importance of Russia's western/northwestern maritime defence the Northern Fleet, originally part of the Joint Strategic Command West (Western Military District), on 12 December 2014 became the basis for the newly formed fifth Northern Fleet Joint Strategic Command.

In 2024, amid increasing tensions with NATO, and owing to a significantly weakened position for Russia in northern Europe, resulting from the Swedish and Finnish entry into NATO, both the Northern and Baltic Fleets were subordinated to the higher command of the Russian Navy while land forces (formerly subordinate to the fleets) were brought under their respective ground force military districts. The same reorganization presumably impacted the Russian Black Sea Fleet, the Caspian Flotilla and the Pacific Fleet.

=== Submarine and surface forces ===
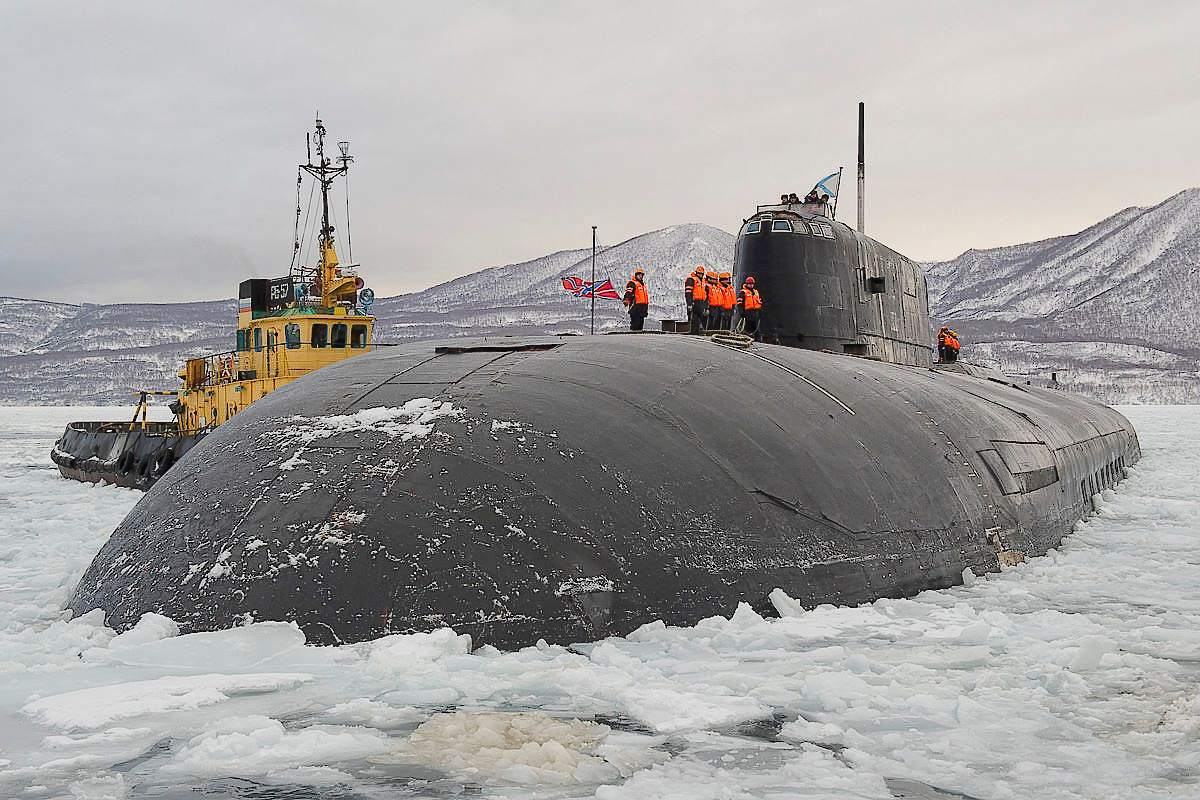
Oscar II class cruise missile submarine Tomsk

The submarine and surface forces form the backbone of the Navy. Submarines can form part of dedicated submarine squadrons and flotillas or, alternatively, they can operate as part of squadrons and flotillas of mixed composition together with major and/or minor surface combatants.

Over the past two decades there has been an attempt to modernize and update the fleet by emphasizing the production and introduction of modern light units to begin to replace large numbers of obsolescent corvettes, missile boats and mine counter-measures ships from the Soviet-era. In addition, there has been significant emphasis on submarine production with the introduction of nuclear-powered ballistic missile, nuclear-powered cruise missile as well as new classes of conventionally-powered attack submarines. This trend is continuing through the 2020s, particularly in relation to the submarine component of Russia's nuclear deterrent forces.

Russian Navy organisation
Part of	Fleet unit	Officer commanding	Ground and air forces equivalent	Officer commanding	Notes
General Staff of the Armed Forces of the Russian Federation	Commander-in-Chief of the Navy (Главнокомандующий Военно-морским флотом Российской Федерации)	Admiral	Commander-in-Chief of the Land Forces (Главнокомандующий Сухопутными войсками Российской Федерации) Commander-in-Chief of the Aerospace Forces (Главнокомандующий Воздушно-космическими силами Российской Федерации)	Colonel general	
General Staff of the Armed Forces of the Russian Federation	Chief of Staff and First Deputy Commander of the Navy (Начальник штаба — первый заместитель Главнокомандующего ВМФ)	Vice admiral	Chief of the Main Staff and First Deputy Commander of the Land Forces (Начальник Главного штаба Сухопутных войск — первый заместитель главнокомандующего Сухопутными войсками) Chief of the Main Staff and First Deputy Commander of the Aerospace Forces (Начальник Главного штаба — первый заместитель Главнокомандующего Воздушно-космическими силами)	Lieutenant general	
General Staff of the Armed Forces of the Russian Federation	Deputy Commander of the Navy (Заместитель Главнокомандующего ВМФ)	Vice admiral / Lieutenant general (Marines and Naval Aviation)	Deputy Commander of the Land Forces (Заместитель Главнокомандующего СВ) Deputy Commander of the Aerospace Forces (Заместитель Главнокомандующего ВКС)	Lieutenant general	
Russian Navy	Commander of the Northern Fleet (Командующий Северным флотом)	Admiral	Military District	Colonel general	
Russian Navy	Commander of the Pacific Fleet (Командующий Тихоокеанским флотом)	Admiral	Military District	Colonel general	
Russian Navy	Commander of the Baltic Fleet (Командующий Балтийским флотом)	Vice admiral	Army; Air Army	Lieutenant general	
Russian Navy	Commander of the Black Sea Fleet (Командующий Черноморским флотом)	Vice admiral	Army; Air Army	Lieutenant general	
Russian Navy	Commander of the Caspian Flotilla (Командующий Каспийской флотилией)	Kontradmiral	Army Corps	Major general	
Fleet (Флот)	Flotilla (Флотилия)	Kontradmiral	Used to correspond to a ground forces or air forces Army.: Army Corps; Air Force of a (specific) Fleet	Major general	Could be separate Flotilla or one forming part of a Fleet. For example, the modern day Primorskaya Mixed Forces Formation (formerly Mixed Forces Flotilla) of the Pacific Fleet.
Fleet (Флот)	Operational Squadron (Оперативная эскадра)	Kontradmiral	Army Corps; Air Force of a (specific) Fleet	Major general	Naval Task Force. For example, the Permanent task force of the Russian Navy in the Mediterranean Sea.
Fleet (Флот)	Squadron (ships) (Эскадра)	Kontradmiral	Army Corps; Air Force of a (specific) Fleet	Major general	A permanent formation, combining several divisions and brigades. Equal to an Army Corps.
Squadron (ships)	Division of major ships (Дивизия кораблей)	Kontradmiral	Division	Major general	For example, the Black Sea Fleet's 30th Surface Ships Division or the Northern Fleet's 7th Submarine Division.
Fleet (Флот)	Naval Base (Военно-морская база)	Kontradmiral	Division	Major general	A Naval Base is a command of divisional level, which is subordinated to a Fleet or Flotilla. It provides berthing, supply and repair to the Fleet's main forces, as well as defence against conventional and asymmetric threats. For that reason it includes a Brigade of ships of at least one missile corvette division and one minesweeper division. The base also deploys counter-diversion combat divers and possibly a coastal defence ground formation of marines and coastal artillery. The Naval Base could include a main base location and one or more secondary locations, in which case the secondary locations would deploy a mixed division of corvettes/ fast attack craft and minesweepers.
Squadron (ships) / Naval Base	Brigade of ships (Бригада кораблей)	Kontradmiral / Captain 1st rank	Brigade	Major general / Colonel	Submarine Boats Brigade (Бригада подводных лодок) includes diesel-electric submarines and is directly subordinated to a Fleet.; Landing Ships Brigade (Бригада десантных кораблей) includes large landing ships and is directly subordinated to a Fleet.; Waterborne Area Defence Ships Brigade (Бригада кораблей охраны водного района) normally includes an ASW corvette division and a minesweepers division and is subordinated to a Naval Base.; Brigade of Ships in Construction or Repair (Бригада строящихся и ремонтирующихся кораблей) subordinated to a Naval Base.
Division of major ships (Дивизия кораблей)	Division of warships of 2nd rank (Дивизион кораблей 2-го ранга)	Captain 1st Rank	Regiment / Air Regiment	Colonel	Increasingly out of use as in modern days warships 2nd class form ships brigades and ships divisions.
Division of major ships (Дивизия кораблей) / Brigade of ships (Бригада кораблей)	Division of warships of 3rd rank (Дивизион кораблей 3-го ранга)	Captain 2nd rank	Separate Battalion / Air Squadron	Lieutenant colonel	Division of corvettes.
Brigade of ships (Бригада кораблей) / Naval Base (Военно-морская база)	Division of warships of 4th rank (Дивизион кораблей 4-го ранга)	Captain 3rd rank	Separate Battalion / Air Squadron	Major	Division fast craft or minesweepers.
Brigade of ships (Бригада кораблей) / Naval Base (Военно-морская база)	Division of warships of 4th rank (Дивизион кораблей 4-го ранга)	Captain 3rd rank / Captain lieutenant	Separate Company / Separate Battery / Air Flight	Captain	In case of a division of small support craft of a naval base, such as tug boats, fire boats, courier launches etc.
Individual ships
Division of major ships (Дивизия кораблей) / Brigade of ships (Бригада кораблей)	Warship 1st rank	Captain 1st Rank	Regiment / Air Regiment: The departments of the Ship's Company are called Combat Units (Боевая часть (БЧ) and correspond to battalions)	Colonel	ballistic missile submarine (submarine nuclear missile cruiser of strategic purpose (РПКСН)); attack submarine (nuclear submarine boat (АПЛ)); aircraft carrier (heavy aviation-carrying cruiser (ТАВКР)); nuclear battlecruiser (heavy nuclear missile cruiser (ТАРКР - not operational as of 2025); missile cruiser (РК); large destroyer (guided missile destroyer 1st rank (Эсм. УРО 1-го ранга)); large ASW destroyer (БПК)
Brigade of ships (Бригада кораблей) / Division of small ships (Дивизион кораблей)	Warship 2nd rank	Captain 2nd rank	Separate Battalion / Air Squadron: The departments of the Ship's Company are called Combat Units (Боевая часть (БЧ) and correspond to companies)	Lieutenant colonel	diesel-electric submarine (ДЭПЛ); small destroyer (guided missile destroyer 2nd rank (Эсм. УРО 2-го ранга)); missile frigate (guard ship (СКР)); ASW frigate (large ASW ship 2nd rank (БПК 2-го ранга)); offshore patrol vessel; large landing ship (БДК)
Division of ships 3rd rank (Дивизион кораблей 3-го ранга)	Warship 3rd rank	Captain 3rd rank	Separate Battalion / Air Squadron: The departments of the Ship's Company are called Combat Units (Боевая часть (БЧ) and correspond to platoons)	Major	missile corvette (small missile ship (МРК)); ASW corvette (small ASW ship (МПК)); coastal patrol vessel (small artillery ship (МАК)); seagoing minesweeper (МТ); medium landing ship (СДК); small air cushion landing ship (МДКВП)
Division of ships 4th rank (Дивизион кораблей 4-го ранга)	Warship 4th rank	Captain lieutenant / Senior lieutenant / Lieutenant	Platoon	Captain / Senior lieutenant / Lieutenant	missile fast attack craft (missile cutter (РКА)); gun fast attack craft (artillery cruiser (АКА)); torpedo fast attack craft (torpedo cutter (ТКА)); anti-submarine craft (guard cutter (СКА)); coastal minesweeper (base minesweeper (БТ)); minesweeping boat (roadstead minesweeper (РТ)); landing craft (landing cutter (ДКА))

=== Coastal troops ===
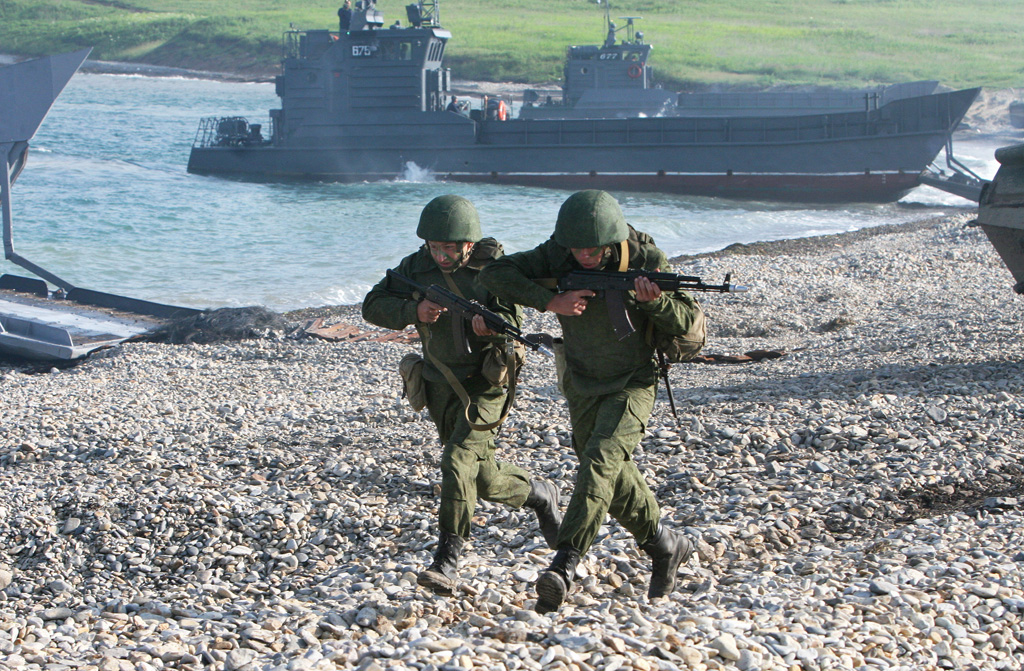
Russian Naval Infantry during the Vostok Strategic Exercise in the Vladivostok area, 2010

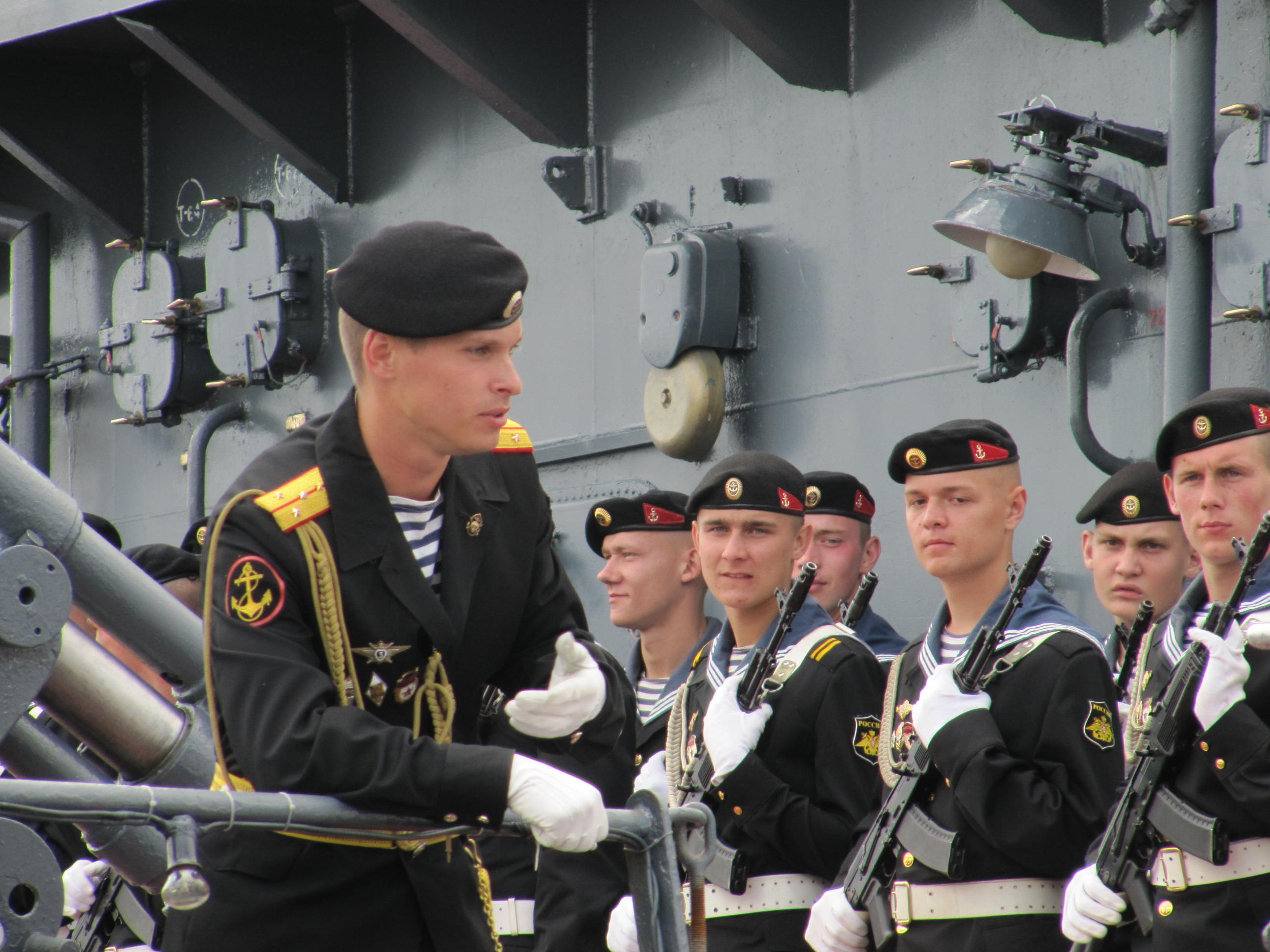
Russian Naval Infantrymen

Coastal Troops include the Naval Infantry and the Coastal Missile and Artillery Troops.

The Russian Naval Infantry are the amphibious force of the Russian Navy and can trace their origins back to 1705, when Peter the Great issued a decree for an infantry regiment "of naval equipage". Since its formation it has seen action in the Napoleonic Wars, the Crimean War, the Russo-Japanese War, the First and Second World Wars, and the Chechen and Georgian conflicts. Under the leadership of Admiral Gorshkov during the Cold War, the Soviet Navy expanded the reach of the Naval Infantry and deployed it worldwide on numerous occasions, but since the dissolution of the Soviet Union its role has been greatly reduced.

The Soviet Naval Infantry and their Russian successors have a reputation as elite shock troops. For their black uniforms and ferocious performance in combat in the Black Sea and Baltic Sea regions during World War II they received the nickname "The Black Death" (German: der schwarze Tod). The Russian Naval Infantry is a mechanised force, organised in brigades, independent regiments and independent battalions. The 55th Naval Infantry Division of the Pacific Fleet has been disbanded in 2009 and replaced by two separate brigades. Each brigade has a tank battalion, a self-propelled artillery battalion, a self-propelled air defence battalion, mechanised marine infantry battalions, other support units and one Airborne Assault Naval Infantry Battalion (десантно-штурмовой батальон морской пехоты), parachute and air assault qualified, with the mission to spearhead amphibious landings.

The coastal defence troops of the Russian Navy are conventional mechanised brigades with the main task to prevent enemy amphibious landings. An example of coastal defence troops are those of the Baltic Fleet. With Estonia, Latvia and Lithuania declaring independence at the end of the Soviet Union the Baltic Military District practically disintegrated. The massive ground forces formations left landlocked in the Kaliningrad Oblast were transferred from the ground forces to naval command and control. The integration of naval infantry and coastal defence troops is a relatively new tendency from the 2010s in order to simplify the naval command structure and the new Arctic infantry brigades in formation under the Northern Fleet fall within that process.

As of 2022, there appeared to be a longer-term intent to expand all Russian naval infantry brigades into division-sized formations, coupled with the planned acquisition of both the new Ivan Rogov-class helicopter assault ships as well as upgraded Ivan Gren-class landing ships. However, full implementation of such a plan would likely have to await the conclusion of the Russo-Ukraine War.

The coastal artillery troops also play a very important role for the Navy. The geography of the Barents Sea, the Baltic Sea, the Black Sea and the Sea of Okhotsk as well as the Caspian Sea makes the deployment of shore-based, anti-ship systems in an area-denying role very effective. They deploy K-300P Bastion-P supersonic ASCM, 3M-54 Kalibr cruise subsonic ASCM and A-222E Bereg-E 130mm coastal mobile artillery system as well as self-propelled surface-to-air missile systems.

The Naval Infantry and Coastal Troops are led by the Deputy Commander for Naval Infantry/Commandant of the Naval Infantry of the Russian Navy, Lieutenant General (NI) Aleksandr Kolpatsenko. Their motto is: "Where We Are, There is Victory!"

=== Naval aviation ===
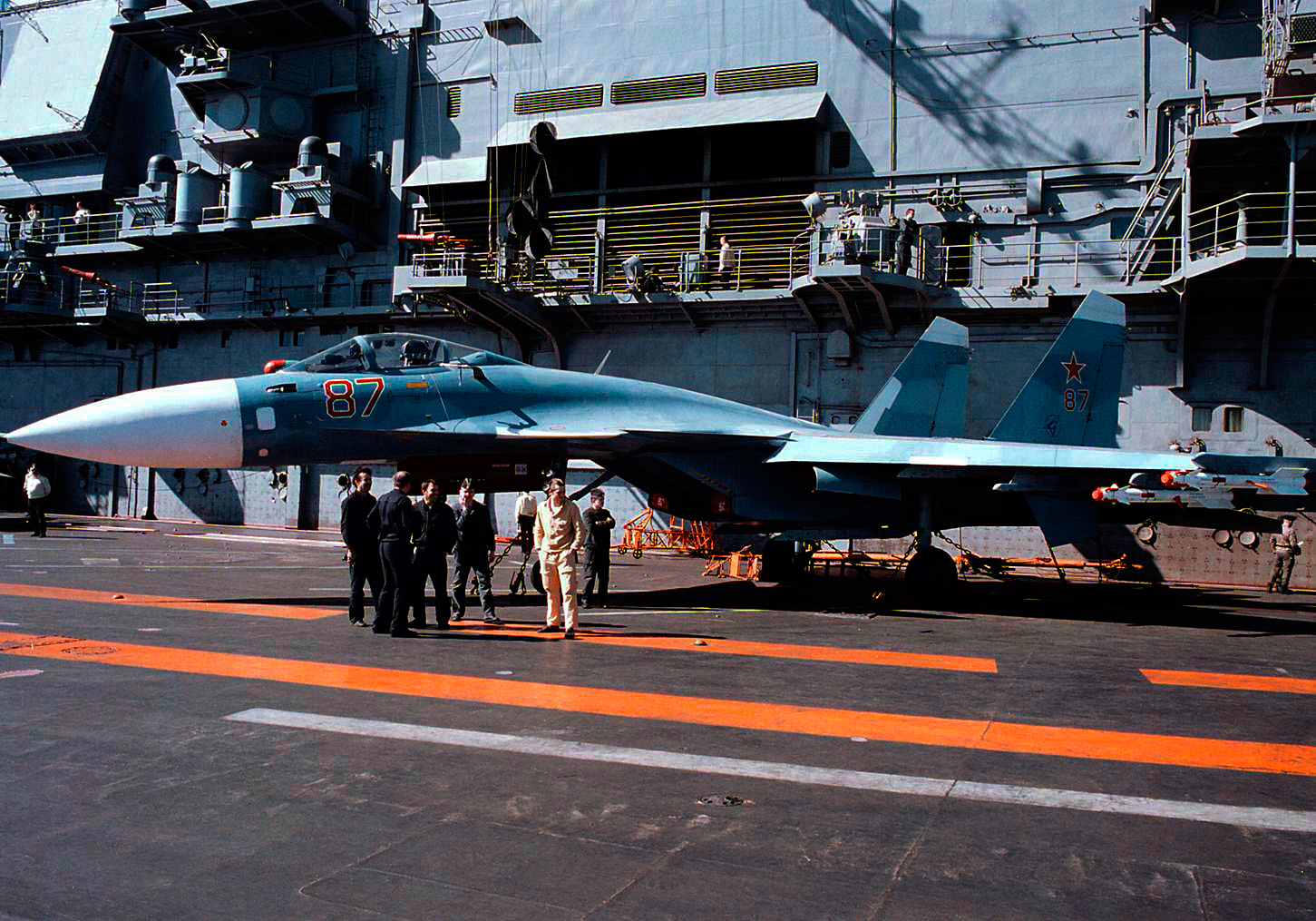
A Sukhoi Su-33 from the 279th Shipborne Fighter Aviation Regiment on Admiral Kuznetsov's flight deck

Since the fall of the Soviet Union Russia's naval aviation has been significantly reduced in size. The Tu-22Ms have been transferred to the Aerospace Forces and since then the combat arm of the Naval Aviation is built around Sukhoi Su-33s, Mikoyan MiG-29Ks, with Sukhoi Su-30s and Sukhoi Su-34s replacing the obsolete Sukhoi Su-24s. Russia's sole aircraft carrier, Admiral Flota Sovetskogo Soyuza Kuznetsov (063), has also been inactive since 2017 and, as of 2025, has been reported as unlikely to return to operational service. The carrier's fixed-wing aircraft were then re-deployed to a land-based role.

As of 2025, the Russian Naval Aviation consists of the following components:

- Naval missile-carrying aviation
- Shore-based ASW aviation
- Attack (Shturmovik) aviation
- Shore-based fighter aviation
- Reconnaissance aviation
- Shipborne aviation (principally ASW helicopters)
- Auxiliary air units

As of 2025, aircraft losses during the Russo-Ukraine War, for both the Russian Aerospace Forces and shore-based Russian naval aviation, have included at least seven Sukhoi Su-30SMs and between 10 and 20 of the older Su-24MRs. Russia's total inventory of approximately 110 Su-30s, and reserve stocks of at least 100 Su-24s, may allow for some of these losses to be absorbed but they have not been insignificant.

== Ranks, rates and insignia ==
=== Commissioned officer ranks ===
The rank insignia of commissioned officers.

Rank group	General / flag officers				Senior officers			Junior officers
Russian Navy
Russian Navy	Адмирал флота Admiral flota	Адмирал; Admiral	Вице-адмирал; Vitse-admiral	Контр-адмирал; Contre-admiral	Капитан 1-го ранга Kapitan 1-go ranga	Капитан 2-го ранга Kapitan 2-go ranga	Капитан 3-го ранга Kapitan 3-go ranga	Капитан-лейтенант; Kapitan-leytenant	Старший лейтенант Starshiy leytenant	Лейтенант; Leytenant	Младший лейтенант Mladshiy leytenant

=== Other ranks ===
The rank insignia of non-commissioned officers and enlisted personnel.

Rank group	Under-officers		NCOs				Enlisted
Russian Navy
Russian Navy	Старший мичман Starshy michman	Мичман; Michman	Главный корабельный старшина Glavny korabelny starshina	Главный старшина Glavny starshina	Старшина 1 статьи Starshina 1 statji	Старшина 2 статьи Starshina 2 statji	Старший матрос Starshy matros	Матрос; Matros

== Equipment ==
=== Bastion concept, sensor and radar systems ===
Historically, the Russian navy has emphasized the creation of submarine bastions, both to protect the security of its submarine-based nuclear forces and to secure the Arctic and Pacific approaches to Russian territory. In order to strengthen its submarine bastion in the Barents Sea, in 2025 it was reported that Russia has likely deployed a network of sonar systems in that region in order to detect submarines. The network, known as "Harmony", is reported to be composed of detection devices arrayed in an arc stretching from Murmansk, via Novaya Zemlja to Franz Josef Land.

The Russian Navy uses Podsolnukh over-the-horizon surface wave radar for detection of ships. As of 2019, four radars have been delivered to the coasts of Caspian Sea, Okhotsk Sea, Sea of Japan and Baltic Sea.

== Fleets ==
The Russian Navy consists of four fleets and one flotilla under the command of the Russian Navy's general command structure.

=== Northern Fleet ===
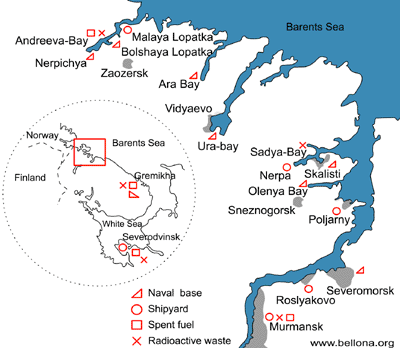
Major bases and headquarters of the Northern Fleet

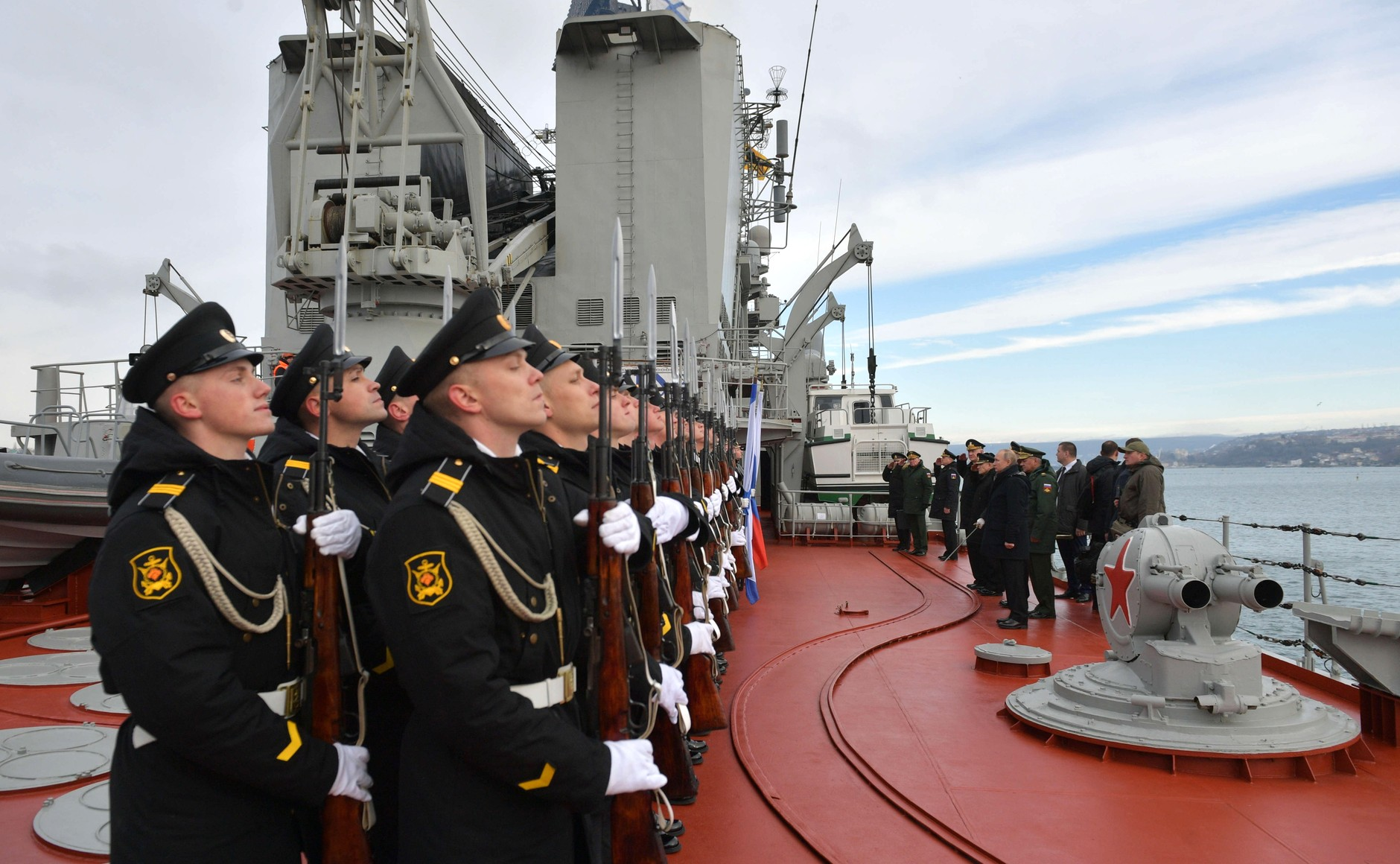
Russian Navy sailors onboard the cruiser Marshal Ustinov in a joint exercise of the Northern and Black Sea fleets

The Russian Northern Fleet, dating to 1733 but established as a modern formation in 1933, is headquartered at Severomorsk and spread around various bases in the greater Murmansk area. It is the main fleet of the Russian Navy. Since 2024, the fleet has been subordinate to the general command of the Russian Navy.

=== Baltic Fleet ===
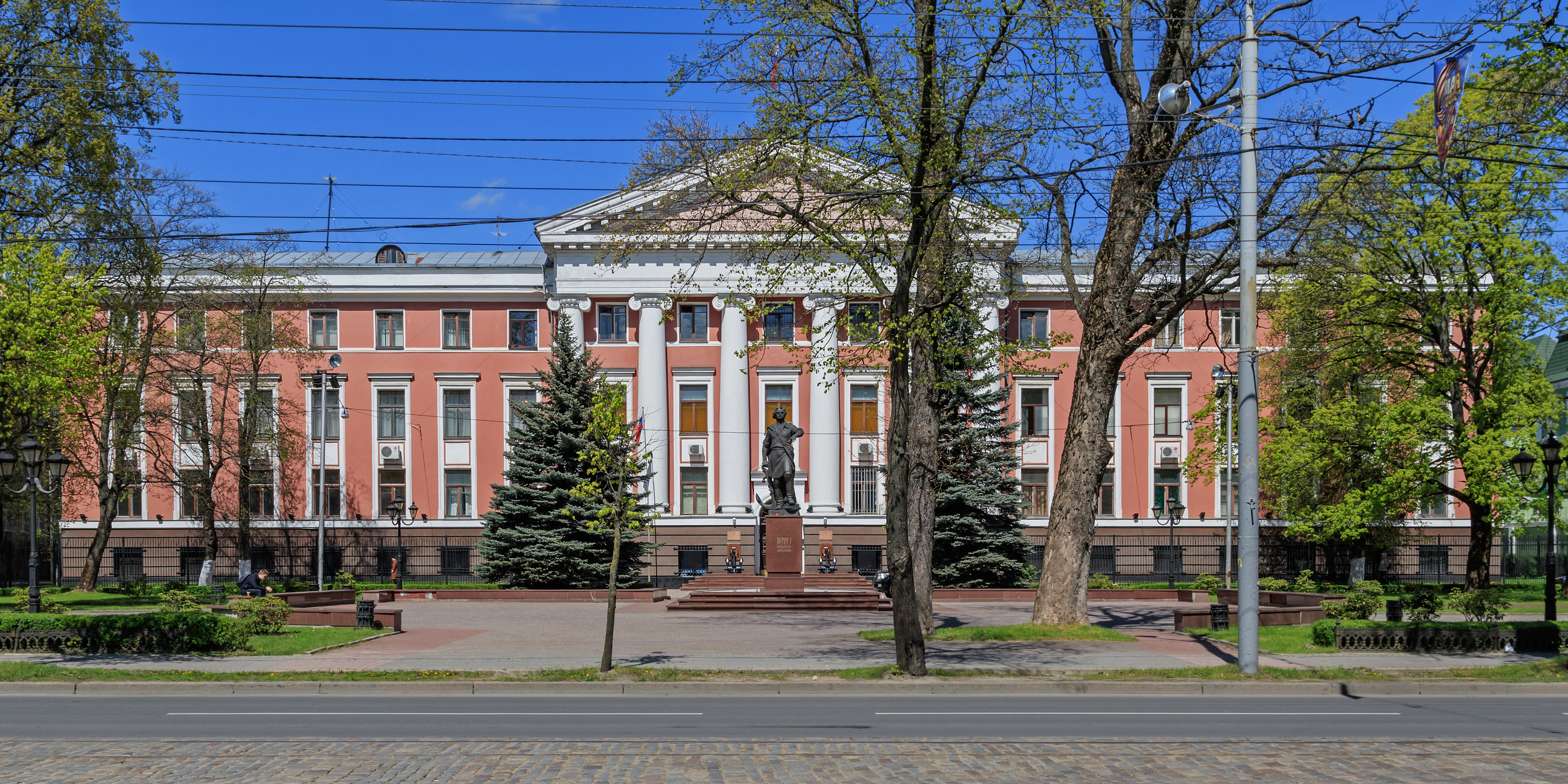
Headquarters of the Baltic Fleet in Kaliningrad

The Baltic Fleet, established on 18 May 1703, is based in Baltiysk and Kronshtadt, with its headquarters in the city of Kaliningrad, Kaliningrad Oblast. Since 2024, the fleet has been subordinate to the Russian Navy general command.

=== Black Sea Fleet ===
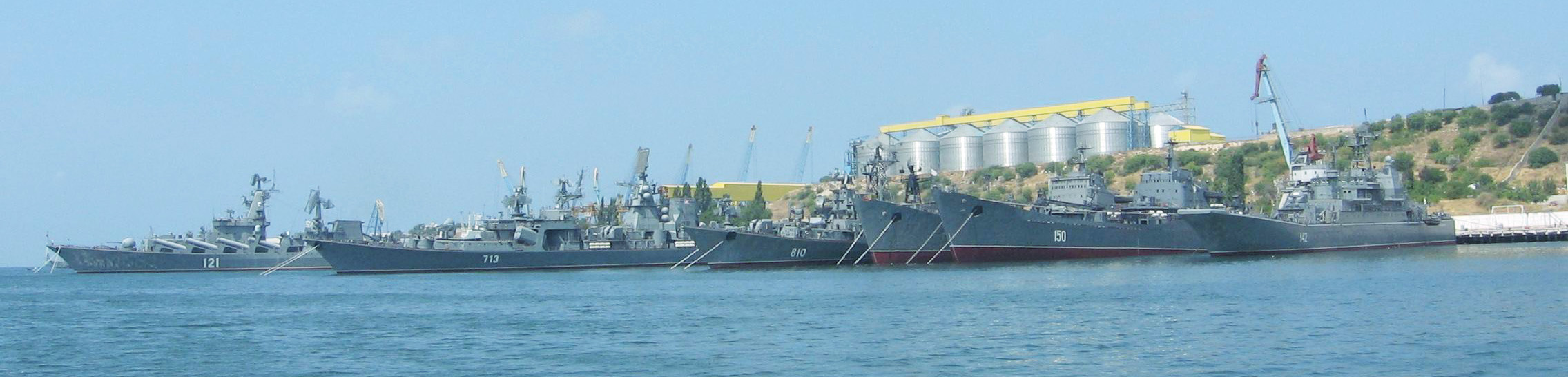
Some major ships of the Black Sea Fleet, including the Moskva (far left) and the Saratov (second right), in Sevastopol, August 2007

The Black Sea Fleet, established on 2 May 1783, is based at the Sevastopol, Karantinnaya, and Streletskaya Bays in Sevastopol which is also the location of its headquarters, and at Novorossiysk in Krasnodar Kray. The fleet also has various other facilities on the Crimean Peninsula and facilities in Krasnodar Kray.

Since the start of the Russo-Ukraine War, the Black Sea Fleet has experienced serious losses in ships and materiel. In the initial stages of the war, the fleet's flagship, the cruiser Moskva, was sunk on 14 April 2022 during the 2022 Russian invasion of Ukraine. Other losses, including the Tapir-class landing ship Saratov followed. For a broader list of Russian and Ukrainian ship losses in the war see:

While the fleet has attempted to continue operations, information on its precise order of battle is necessarily imprecise and Ukrainian surface, sub-surface and aerial drone capabilities have increasingly driven the fleet from open waters.

=== Operational Command South - Tartus ===
The Russian Navy has maintained a base under the command of the Southern Military District in Syria at Tartus. The Mediterranean squadron was disestablished soon after the collapse of the Soviet Union, but a small naval logistics support facility remained there. In January 2017 Russia and Syria signed an agreement, to be valid for 49 years, to expand the Tartus facility with a view to improving the support at Tartus.

On 4 February 2022, naval detachments from the Northern Fleet and Baltic Fleet arrived at Tartus. Large amphibious assault ships Pyotr Morgunov, Georgy Pobedonosets, Olenegorsky Gornyak, Korolyov, Minsk and Kaliningrad were under the direction of Russian Navy Commander-in-Chief Admiral Nikolay Yevmenov. In April 2022 there were around 20 Russian naval ships in the Mediterranean Sea. On 11 May it was reported that the flotilla had remained without change since early February. There were 13 ships and 5 support vessels of the four Russian fleets, including 9 attack missile ships. The formation of a "Mediterranean Squadron" of the Russian Navy in February 2022, using the Northern, Baltic, and Pacific Fleets' ships allowed the Russian Black Sea Fleet to return a large number of ships to the Black Sea some time prior to Russia’s attack on Ukraine. On 27 February three days after the commencement of the Russian invasion of Ukraine Turkey (who acts as guarantor of the Montreux Convention) decided to ban the passage through the straits of any warships whose homeport is not in the Black Sea.

As of mid-2025, the loss of regular use of the Russian base at the port of Tartus in Syria, as a result of the Fall of the Assad regime in late 2024, has significantly impacted the ability of the Russian navy to maintain an effective presence in the Mediterranean region. As of mid-2025, Russia and Syria were reportedly engaged in negotiations about the future of Russian naval and air facilities in the country though it remained unclear how extensive Russia's military presence in Syria would be going forward. As of March 2026, the Russian navy appeared to be using the naval facility intermittently though more regularized use going forward seemed probable.

In mid-2026 it was reported that there were no major Russian warships currently in the Mediterranean. Nevertheless, in August 2026 it was announced that an agreement had been signed between Russia and Syria governing future Russian use of the bases although Russia also seemed increasingly to be looking at the ports of Tobruk in Libya as well as Algiers as more consistent ports of call.

=== Caspian Flotilla ===
The Caspian Flotilla, established on 4 November 1722, is based in Astrakhan and Makhachkala with its headquarters in Astrakhan.

=== Pacific Fleet ===
The Pacific Fleet, originally established as the Okhotsk Military Flotilla in 1731, is headquartered in Vladivostok, based around Vladivostok and Petropavlovsk-Kamchatskiy.

== Future and modernization ==
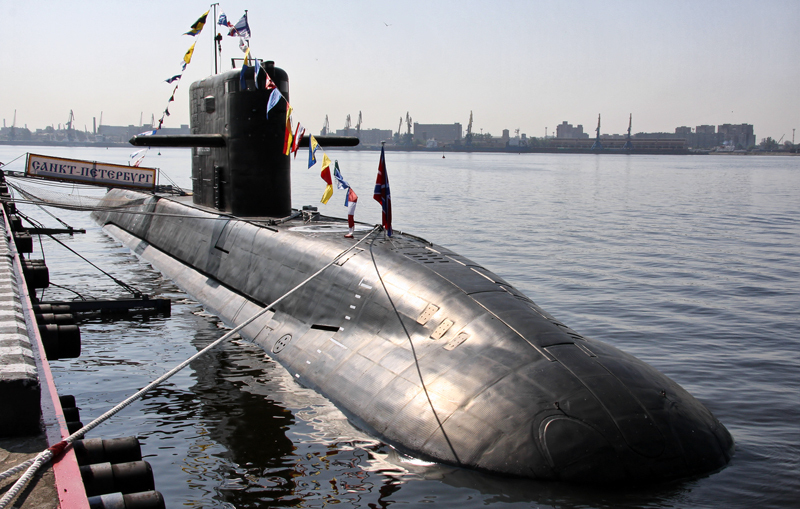
Lada-class diesel-electric submarine Sankt Petersburg

Russia's military budget expanded from 1998 until 2015, but economic problems including a sharp decline in oil prices led to budget cuts in 2016. Higher expenditure led to an increase in numbers of ships under construction, initially focusing on submarines, such as the conventional Petersburg (Lada)-class and nuclear Severodvinsk (Yasen)-class. Some older vessels have been refitted as well.

According to the Russian Defence Ministry, share of modern armament in the Navy has reached more than 50% in 2014. A report from December 2019 estimated the figure at 68%. However, in September 2020 it was reported that the defence budget was to be cut by 5% as part of a shift to social spending and in response the financial impacts of the COVID-19 pandemic. The resulting impact of such a cut on Russian Navy modernization plans was not immediately apparent.

Likely more significant is the impact of sanctions imposed on the Russian Federation after 2022 Russian invasion of Ukraine. In 2021, Russian Security Council Secretary Nikolai Patrushev reportedly acknowledged that the Russian defence industry “is still dependent on foreign technologies.” The impact of international sanctions on naval procurement projects, given both reduced access to foreign technologies and significant pressure on the defence budget, had yet to be determined.

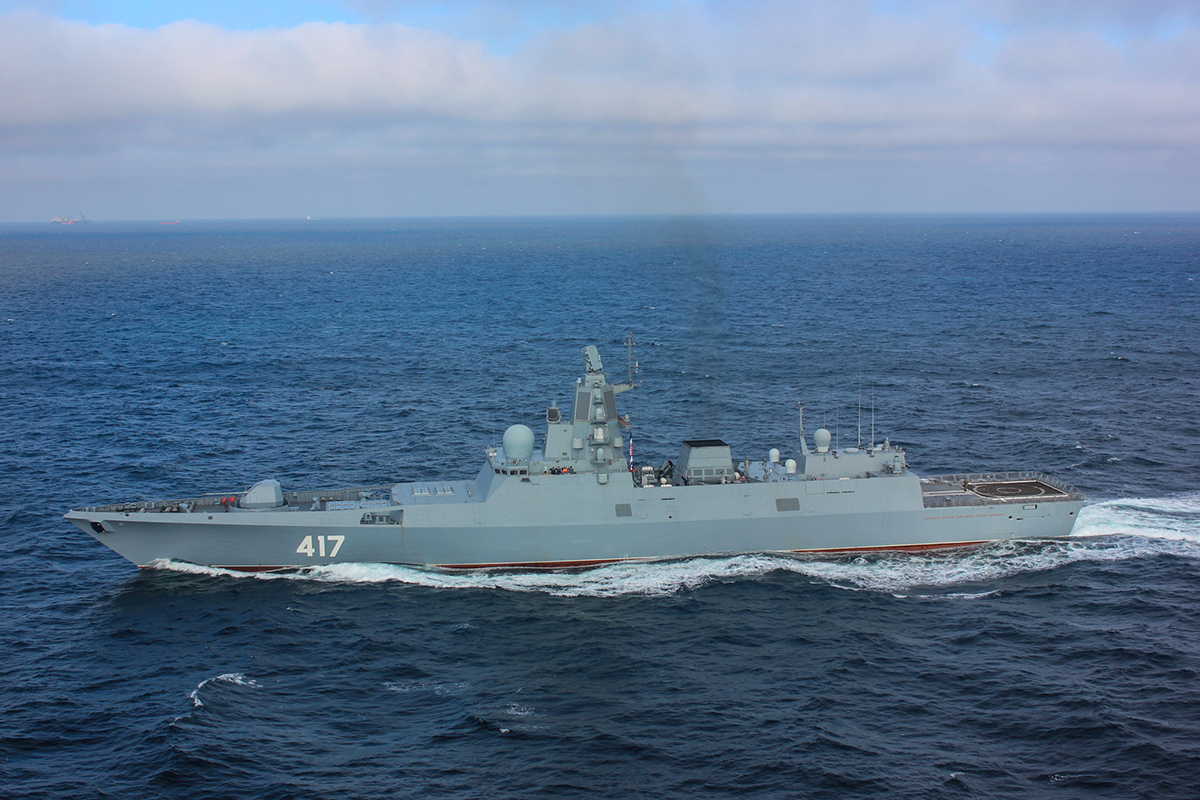
Admiral Gorshkov-class guided missile frigate Admiral Gorshkov, commissioned in 2018

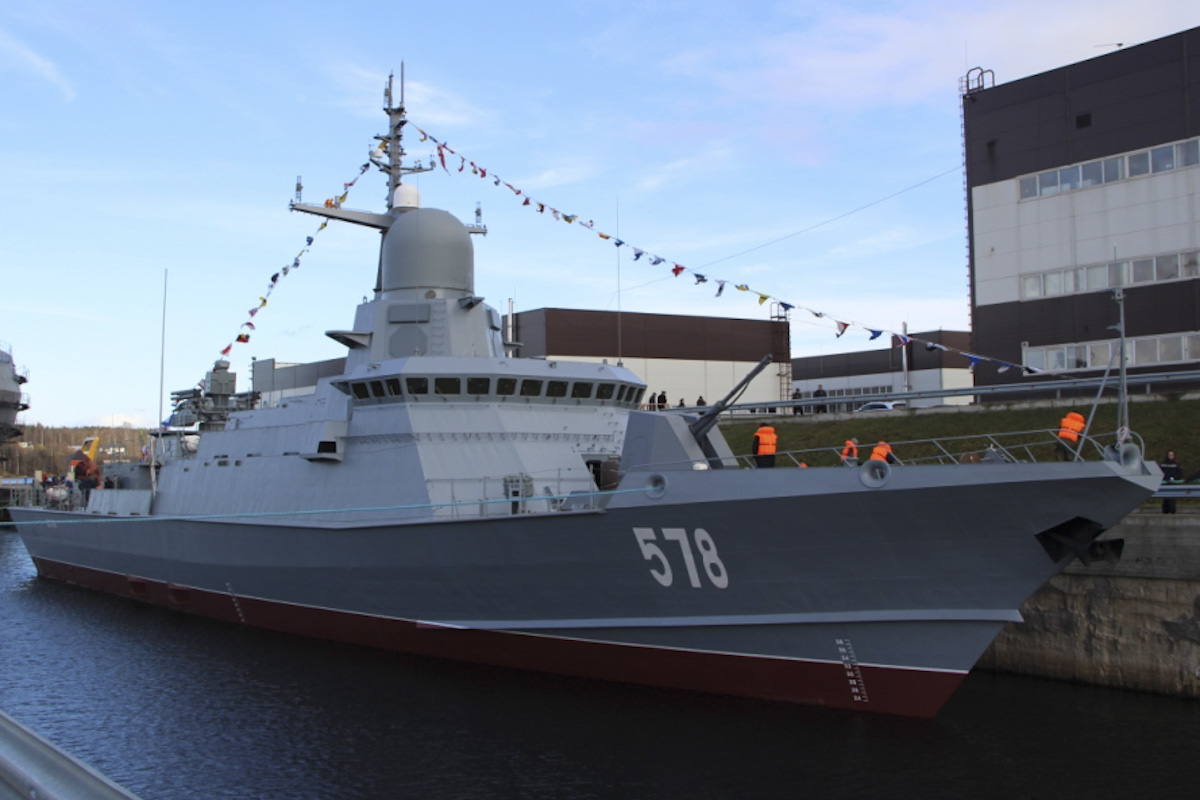
A Karakurt-class guided-missile corvette, capable of launching Kalibr or Oniks supersonic cruise missiles

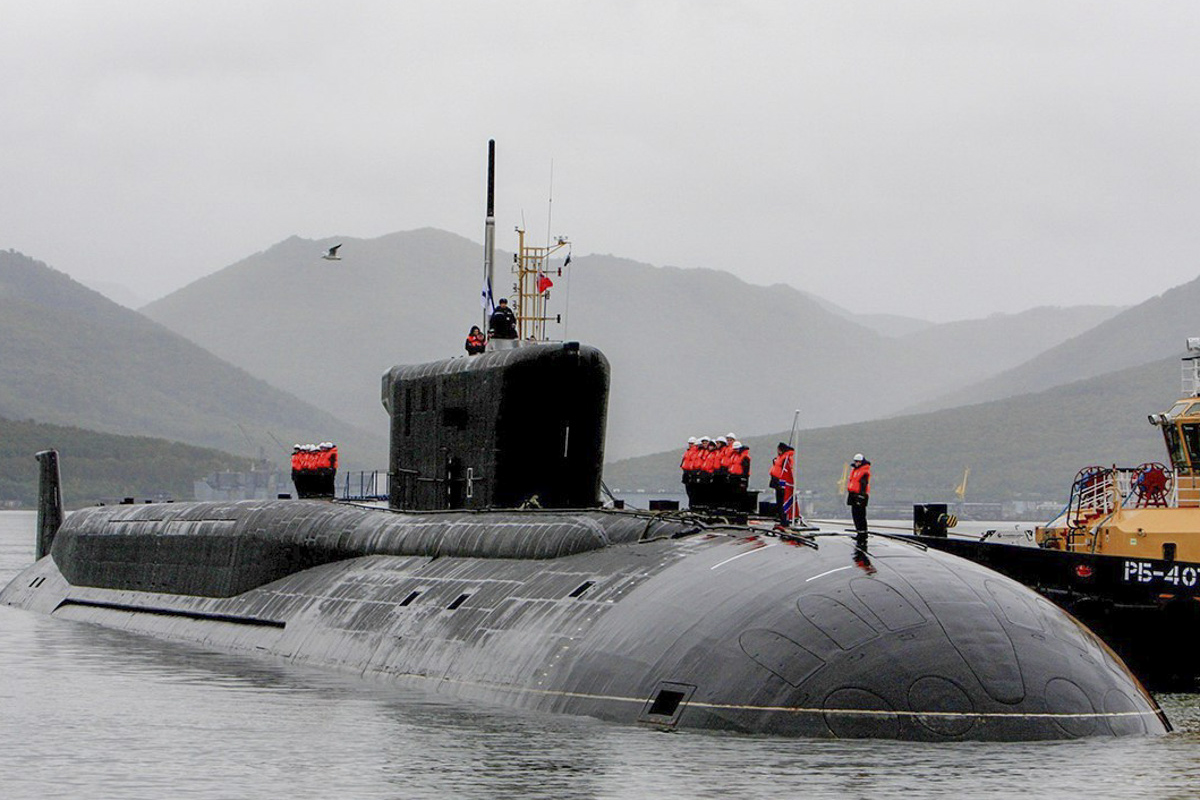
Borei-class nuclear ballistic missile submarine Alexander Nevsky

Since the 2010s, the primary focus of production for the Russian navy has been on new classes of lighter units such as corvettes and frigates as well as on the procurement of several classes of new nuclear and conventionally-powered submarines. In addition, the new Admiral Gorshkov-class frigates have begun to enter service and the large Priboy-class helicopter assault ships have also started construction. These programs are expected to continue through the 2020s and, depending on available funding, projects to acquire larger frigates (the Super-Gorshkov - Project 22350M) and destroyers/cruisers (Lider-class destroyer) may also be initiated. However, until the arrival of such heavier units, older classes of Soviet-era cruisers and destroyers are being modernized. As of 2026, the Russian Navy has not been able to start construction on large surface combatants such as destroyers. The Russian shipbuilding industry also currently does not have the ability to build an aircraft carrier.

=== Submarine projects as of 2026 ===
==== Borei SSBN ====
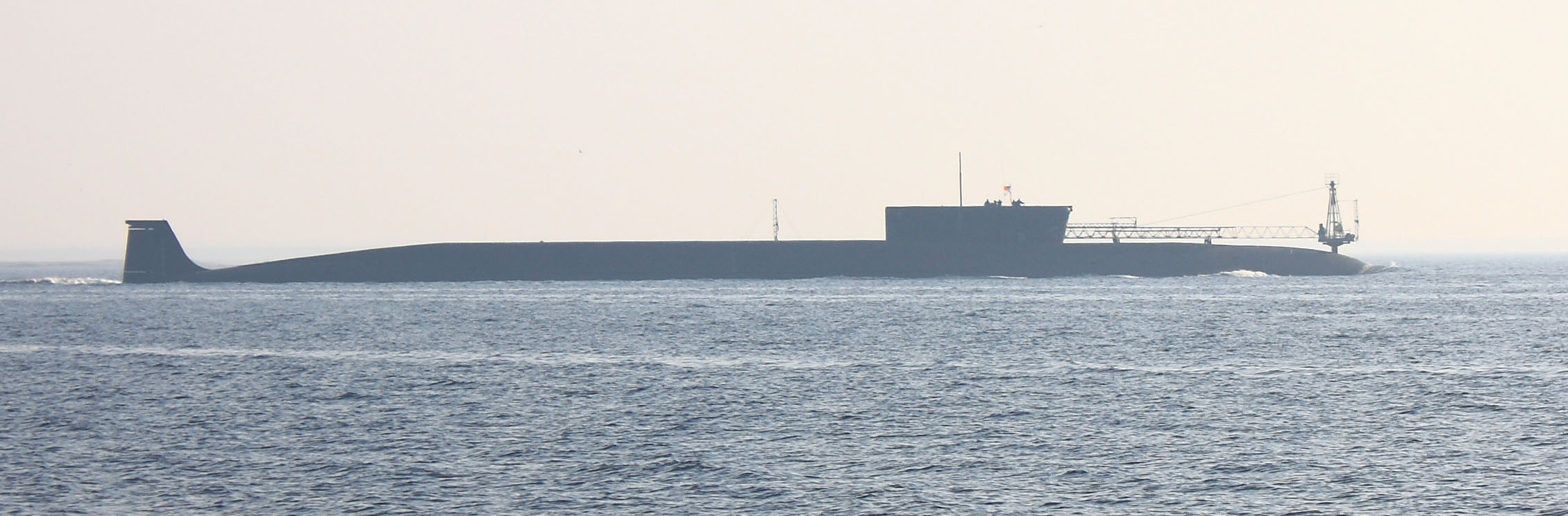
Yury Dolgorukiy is a Borei-class submarine, one of the two nuclear submarine classes (the other being the Yasen-class attack submarine) the Russian Navy has ordered.

Before 2012 there were only about ten nuclear submarine patrols a year, each lasting three months at most and usually a lot less.

However, since that time considerable emphasis has been placed on strengthening the submarine component of Russia's nuclear forces. In 2013, the first unit of the Borei-class ballistic missile submarine entered service. Three Borei-class boats were initially built. The lead boat, Yuriy Dolgorukiy, was launched in April 2007, began sea trials in June 2009 and was commissioned as a part of the Northern Fleet in 2012.

As of the end of 2025, there are eight units of the Borei-class in active service and an additional two boats are under construction. Two further vessels are planned for construction and they are to be in service by the early 2030s. In order to strengthen its submarine bastion in the Barents Sea, in 2025 it was reported that Russia has likely deployed a network of sonar systems in the region in order to detect submarines. The network, known as "Harmony", is reported to be composed of detection devices arrayed in an arc stretching from Murmansk, via Novaya Zemlja to Franz Josef Land.

==== Yasen SSGN ====
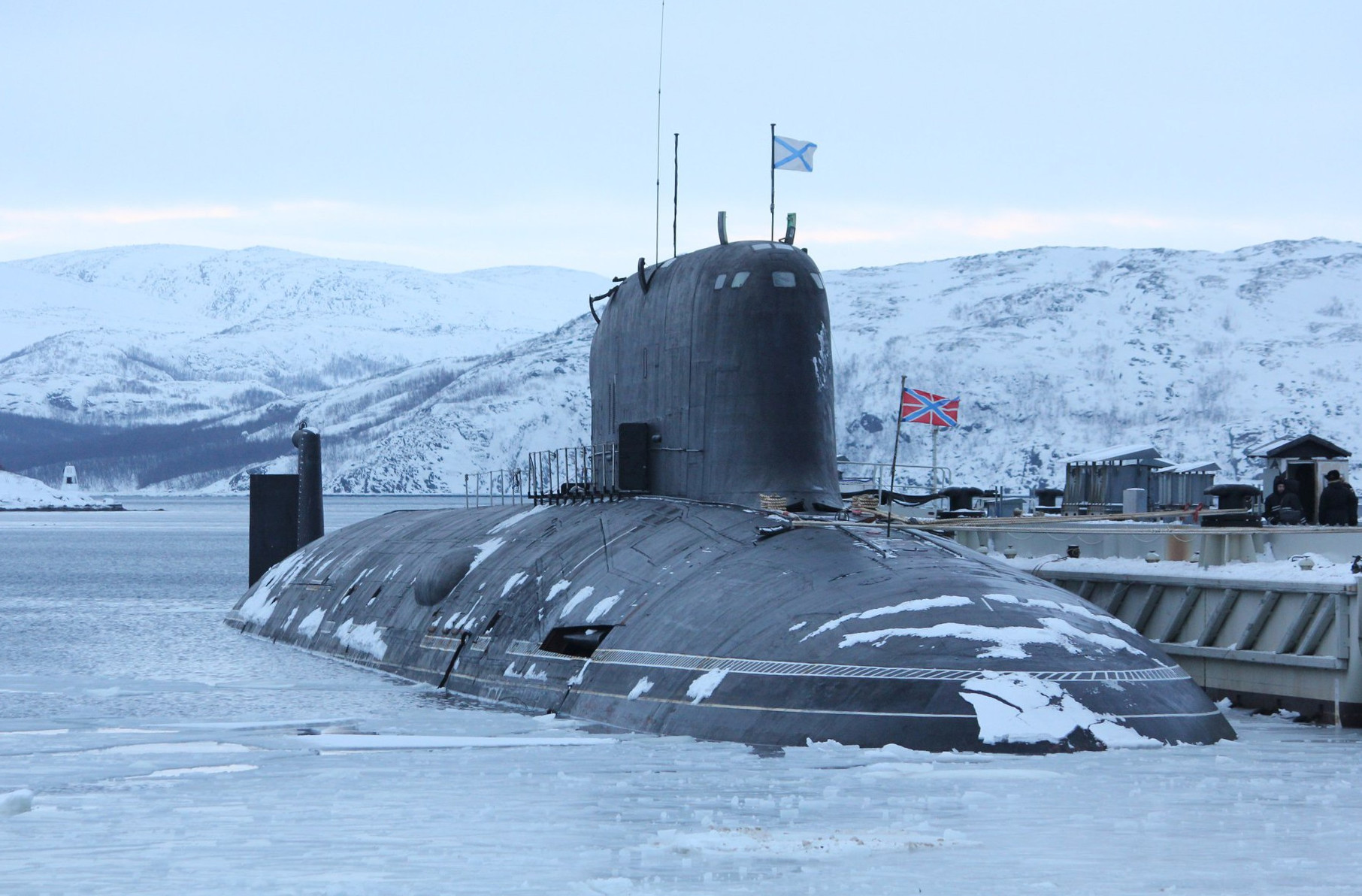
K-560 Severodvinsk

12 Yasen-class nuclear attack cruise missile-armed submarines are planned for delivery to the Russian Navy. Severodvinsk (keel laid down on 21 December 1993), was the first boat of the class slated for launch in 1998 delayed due to problems in financing. In 1996 work on the submarine appeared to have stopped completely. In 2003, the project received additional funding and the work of finishing the submarine continued. In 2004 it was reported that the work on the submarine was moving forward, but due to the priority given to the Borei-class submarines, Severodvinsk, the lead unit of the Yasen-class, would not be ready before 2010. In July 2006 the deputy chairman of the Military-Industrial Commission, Vladislav Putilin, stated that two Yasen-class submarines were to join the Russian Navy before 2015. On 24 July 2009 the work on a second Yasen submarine, named Kazan, was started. Initial sea trials for the first boat of the class (Severodvinsk) took place in the fall of 2011.

As of the end of 2025, Severodvinsk, Kazan, Novosibirsk, Krasnoyarsk and Arkhangelsk are operational while Perm began sea trials in mid-2025. There were four more submarines of the class under construction as of mid-2026, with more planned. In 2026, the Commander-in-Chief of the Russian Navy, Admiral Alexander Moiseyev, stated that the Russian navy aims to replace all of its Project 971, 945, and 949 submarines with between 12 and 14 Yasen-class vessels by 2035. Since this would result in a less than one-for-one replacement of older vessels, it remained unclear whether a further class of submarine, notably the Laika-class, would be built on a sufficiently timely basis as well.

==== Improved Kilo SSK ====
Following on from the success of the Kilo-class submarines, improved design Project 636.3 units are being built for the Russian Navy. As of 2025, six Improved Kilo-class submarines have been built for the Black Sea Fleet, six for the Pacific Fleet, and further units are on order for either the Northern or Baltic Fleets.

In an interview on 15 August 2022, the head of United Shipbuilding Corporation Alexei Rakhmanov stated that the company is currently producing one Project 636.3 submarine per year, however this can be increased to two per year with more funding. He also stated that a few modernisation proposals are being considered, including the ability to carry more Kalibr cruise missiles.

==== Lada and Amur SSK ====
The Lada-class submarine (Project 677) began construction in the latter 1990s. The class experienced significant problems and delays, resulting in a halt to series production and a redesign of the vessels. Series production resumed in the mid-2010s and as of 2025 two vessels are in service and three more are under construction or ordered; up to nine may be planned. In 2023, the lead (prototype) unit (Sankt Peterburg) was decommissioned owing to several years of developmental problems which appear never to have been successfully rectified.

On 18 May 2013 Russian Navy Commander-in-Chief Admiral Viktor Chirkov announced that the Lada-class would receive an air-independent propulsion system by 2016–2017. However, in 2019, Alexander Buzakov, the head of the Admiralty Shipyard, indicated that there were no plans to equip the Lada class with an air-independent propulsion system. The Amur class is advertised as an export version of the Lada class.

==== Haski (Husky) SSN ====
The Laika class, Russian designation Project 545 Laika (Russian: Лайка), also referred to as Husky class (Russian: Хаски, lit. 'husky'), is a series of nuclear-powered fifth-generation multi-purpose submarines currently under development by Malakhit Marine Engineering Bureau for the Russian Navy.

In an interview on 15 August 2022, the head of United Shipbuilding Corporation Alexei Rakhmanov confirmed that the development of fifth-generation submarines is continuing according to schedule. It is unknown if he was referring to the Laika-class submarine, or an as-of-yet (August 2022) unannounced project.

Khabarovsk (Project 09851) & Ulyanovsk (Project 09853) Special Operations Submarines

Following on the delivery of the Belgorod special operations submarine to the Russian Navy in July 2022, the Khabarovsk class is a new submarine class based on the Borei class but with missile tubes removed. She was launched in November 2025 and is to be armed with Status-6 Oceanic Multipurpose System.

Another submarine, Ulyanovsk, which had previously been identified as a separate class but is a variant of the Yasen-class, was launched in July 2026.

=== Surface Warship Projects ===
==== Amphibious operation vessels ====
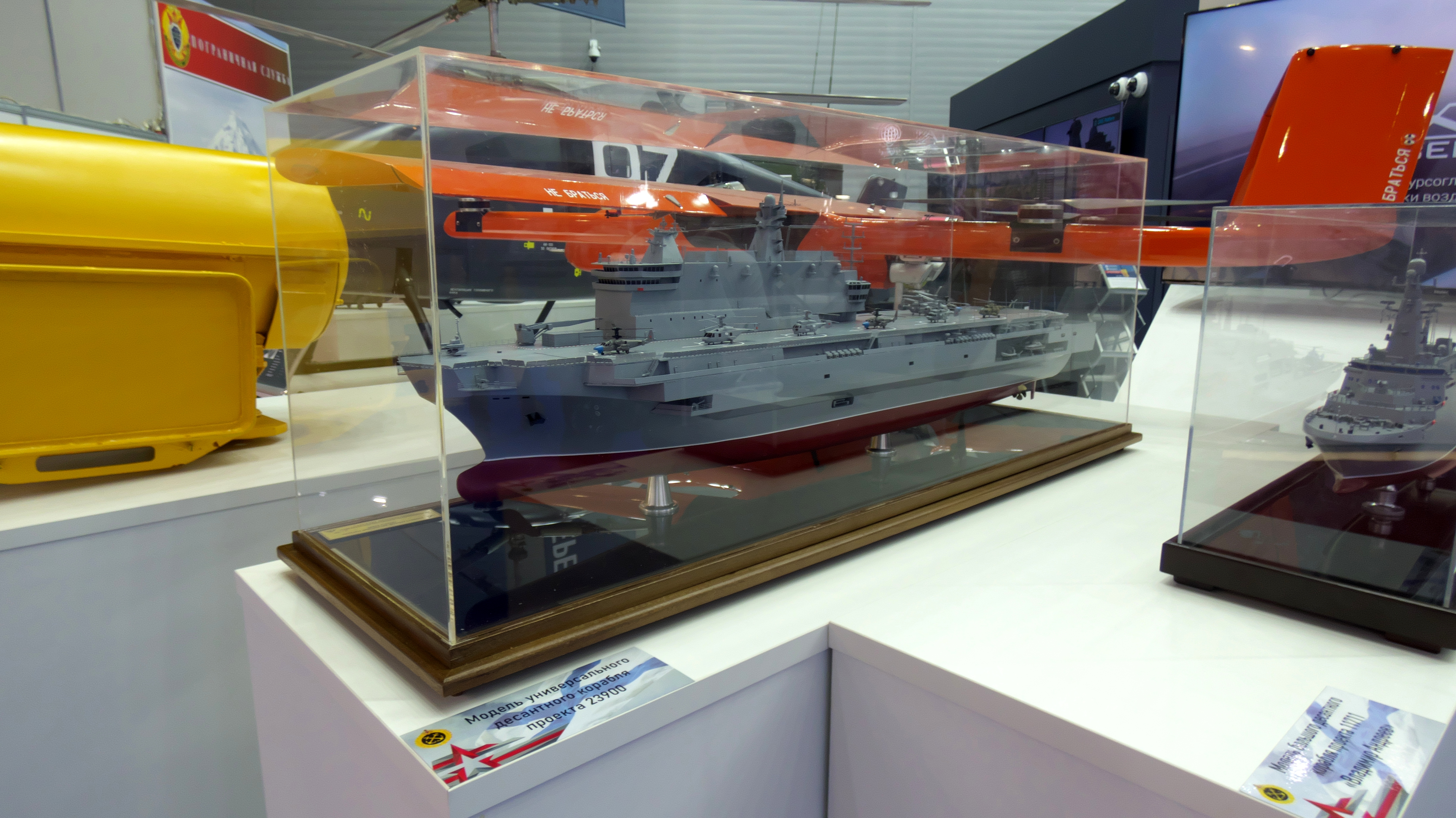
Official model of the Ivan Rogov-class amphibious assault ship

From 2010 to 2014 Russian officials negotiated the purchase of four Mistral-class amphibious assault ships. On 3 September 2014, French President announced that due to Russia's "recent actions in Ukraine", the two ships would not be delivered. In November 2014, François Hollande placed a hold on the delivery of the first Mistral to Russia in view of the conflict in east Ukraine. Hollande set two conditions for delivery: the observation of a ceasefire in Ukraine and a political agreement between Moscow and Kiev. On 5 August 2015 it was announced that France was to pay back Russia's partial payments and keep the two ships initially produced for Russia. The ships eventually were sold to Egypt.

In June 2017, the construction of two future amphibious assault ships for the Russian Navy was included in Russia's new state armament programme for 2018–2025. The cost for one ship is to be about 40 billion RUB ($675 million). The new class of vessel is the Project 23900 Ivan Rogov-class and as of 2025 is under construction at the Zalyv Shipbuilding yard in Crimea. The design calls for a ship of more than 30,000 tons with the delivery of both units anticipated in the latter 2020s/early 2030s.

In January 2018, it was reported the construction of the ships would take place at the Severnaya Verf in Saint Petersburg. However, in July 2020 two units of the class were laid down at the Zalyv Shipbuilding yard, which made them potentially vulnerable to attack following the outbreak of the Russo-Ukraine War.

The Russian navy has suffered serious losses of amphibious vessels in the Russo-Ukraine War. At least three Black Sea Fleet vessels, the Alligator-class landing ship Saratov and the Ropucha-class landing ships Tsezar Kunikov and Novocherkassk, have been confirmed as sunk: Sartov in March 2022 attack at Berdyansk, Novocherkassk in a cruise missile strike in December 2023, and Tsezar Kunikov in February 2024 attack off Crimea. In addition at least one Project 02510 BK-16 assault boat is claimed to have been destroyed by a Bayraktar TB2 drone at Snake Island in 2022. Another BK-16 was reported to have been attacked and destroyed or damaged in August 2025. Russia may be attempting to replace these losses by increasing the production and deployment of additional BK-16s as well as Project 02450 BK-10s.

As of 2025, additional and upgraded amphibious landing ships of the Project 11711 Ivan Gren-class (in addition to two already in service) were also reported to be under construction.

==== Frigates ====
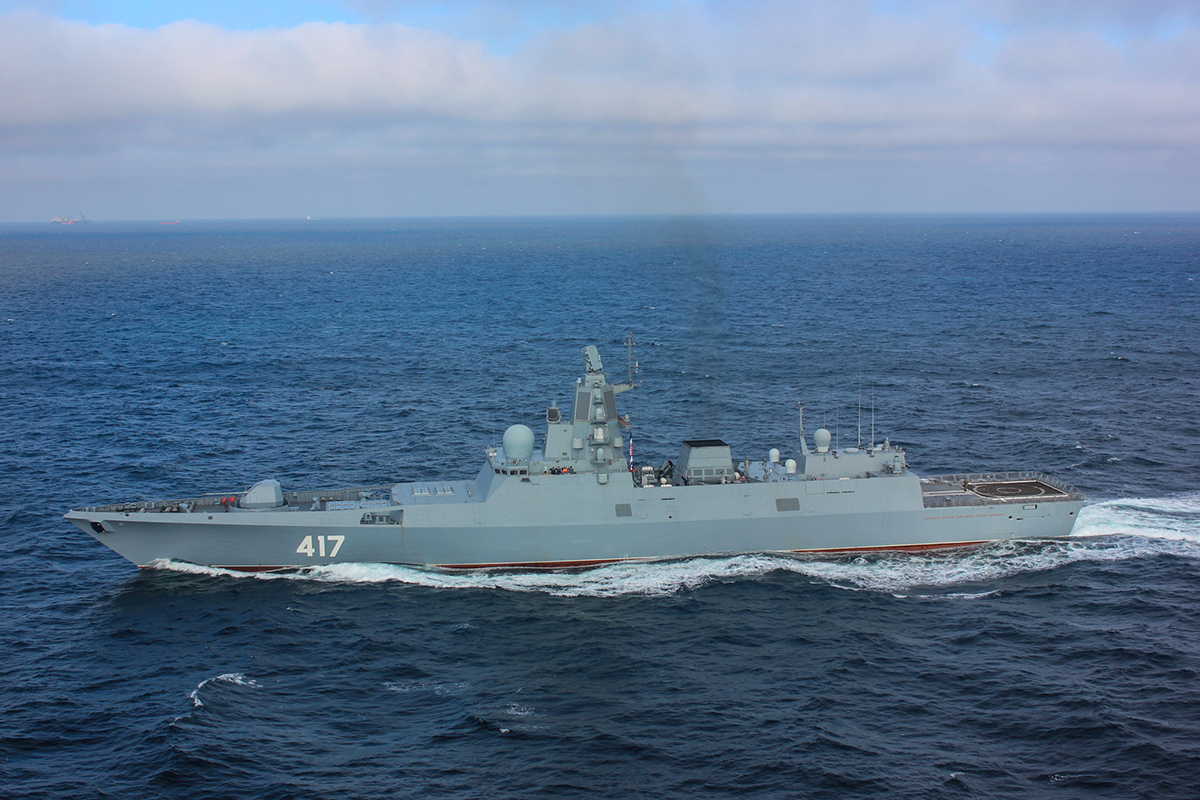
Admiral Gorshkov-class frigate

The Russian Navy has been developing the Project 22350 (Gorshkov-class) frigate for a considerable period of time, together with a larger variant identified as the Project 22350M (Super Gorshkov) frigate. Three Gorshkov-class frigates are in commission and active as of 2025, all with the Northern Fleet. Additionally, three frigates of the Project 11356R Admiral Grigorovich-class were also built for the Black Sea Fleet with the other vessels of the class being sold abroad. Two other vessel classes (the Project 20380 Steregushchiy-class and the Project 20385 Gremyashchiy-class corvettes) are identified as "frigates" by NATO due to their size, armament and role though the Russian Navy classifies them as corvettes. As of 2025, three classes of frigates/corvettes (the Project 22350, Project 20380 & Project 20385 classes) are in production for the Russian Navy, though the larger Project 22350M variant of the Gorshkov-class, remains in development. Production of the Project 11356 frigates has been completed.

Since the start of the Russo-Ukraine War, the production of both the Gorshkov and Gremyashchiy-classes has been impeded by western sanctions since both classes have been dependent on the supply of German and Ukrainian engines. Projects 20385 (as well as the Project 21631 (the Buyan-class corvette)) used German diesel engines, while the 22350 and 11356 used Ukrainian-assembled turbines. Given the sanctions and standoff over the Russo-Ukrainian War, these components were not available after 2015. As a result, two more Steregushchiy-class corvettes, the seventh and eighth of the class, were laid down in February 2015 since this class of vessel uses Russian-built Kolomna engines. Similarly, the power plant in units of the Admiral Gorshkov class (following on the first two) were adapted to use a CODAG diesel and gas turbine engine of Russian manufacture (UEC-Saturn). In November 2020 it was announced that United Engine Corporation had initiated delivery of the DGTA M55R diesel-gas power plant which would be installed on frigates of the 22350-class beginning with Admiral Isakov. Admiral Isakov is the fourth vessel of the Gorshkov-class and is reported "fitting out" for the Russian Pacific Fleet as of 2025.

==== Corvettes ====
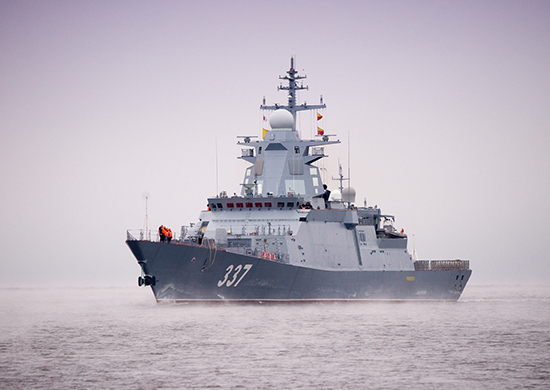
Gremyashchiy-class corvette

With respect to corvettes/large patrol ships, as of 2025 six separate classes were in production to replace Soviet-era vessels. They ranged in size from the small 800-860-ton Karakurt class (Project 22800) up to the 3,400-ton Project 20386 corvette/light frigate. The first of the 2,500-ton Gremyashchiy class (Project 20385) entered service in December 2020. As of 2025, production of the Project 21630 and 21631 Buyan-class corvette and Buyan-M class had been completed. Construction of two additional variants of the Project 1241 Tarantul-class (the Project 12418 "Tarantul IV") was being completed, though it was reported that the total build was likely to remain limited to just two vessels. In addition to the updated Tarantuls, corvette classes in production as of 2025 include:

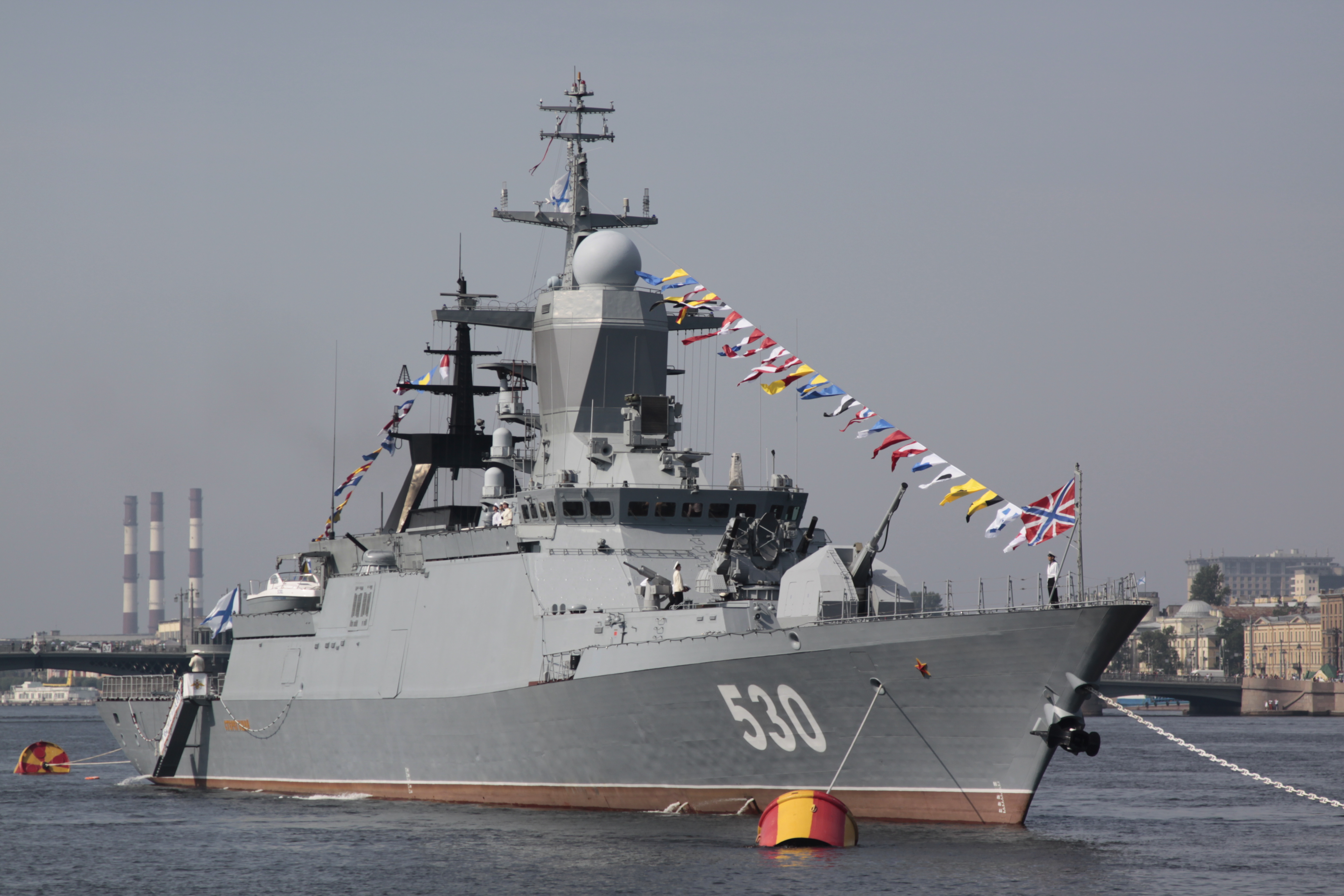
Russian corvette Steregushchiy

- Project 22800 Karakurt-class corvette (800-860 tons)
- Project 22160 Vasily Bykov-class corvette/offshore patrol ship (1,700 tons)
- Project 20380 Steregushchiy-class corvette/light frigate (2,200 tons)
- Project 20385 Gremyashchiy-class corvette/light frigate (2,500 tons)
- Project 20386 Derzky-class corvette/light frigate (3,400 tons) (reportedly being limited to the production of only one vessel)

==== Minor surface combatants ====
Additional patrol vessels under construction include:

- Project 23550 icebreaking patrol ship
- Raptor-class patrol boat
- Grachonok-class anti-saboteur ship

==== Mine-countermeasure vessels ====
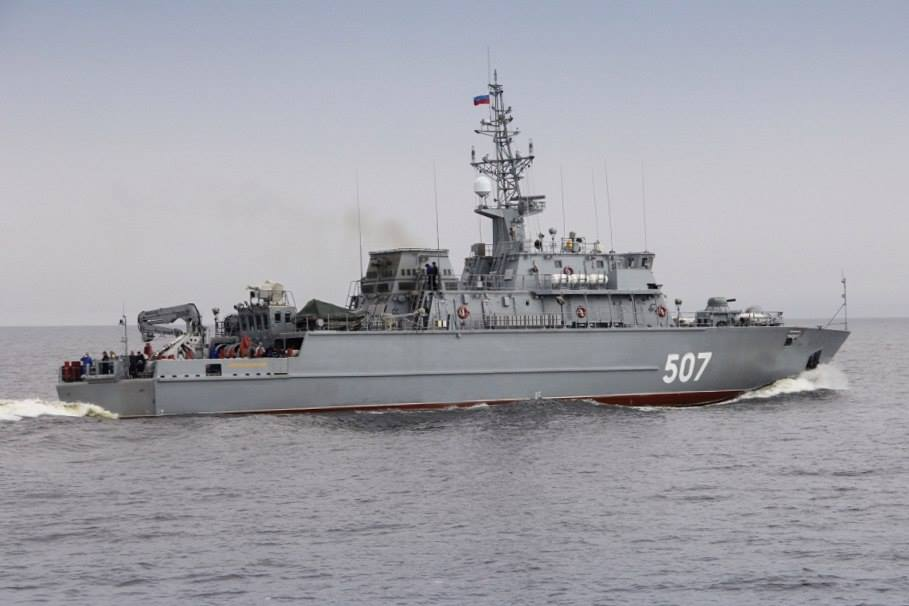
Alexandrit-class minesweeper Aleksandr Obukhov underway

Up to thirty Alexandrit-class minesweepers are planned by 2035. As of 2026, ten are active and additional units are under construction or ordered. In January 2018 Deputy Chief of the Naval Shipbuilding Directorate Captain Mikhail Krasnopeyev said that the Russian Navy is planning to acquire 10 new Alexandrit-class (Project 12700) minesweepers by 2027 and 30 by 2035. In 2019, the Commander-in-Chief of the Navy, Admiral Vladimir Korolyov, significantly enhanced that objective stating that the aim was to have 40 Alexandrit-class mine warfare vessels in service by 2030.

==== Auxiliary ships ====
A wide range of auxiliary ships are in production for the Russian Navy. For a broader list of active auxiliary vessels, and those under construction, see: List of active Russian Navy auxiliary ships.

A new ship class to replace the Ob-class hospital ships can be constructed at Severnaya Verf or Baltic Shipyard.

In the new naval doctrine approved on 31 July 2022, the necessity to construction new modern fully-armed hospital ships was mentioned.

== Main Naval Parade in St. Petersburg ==
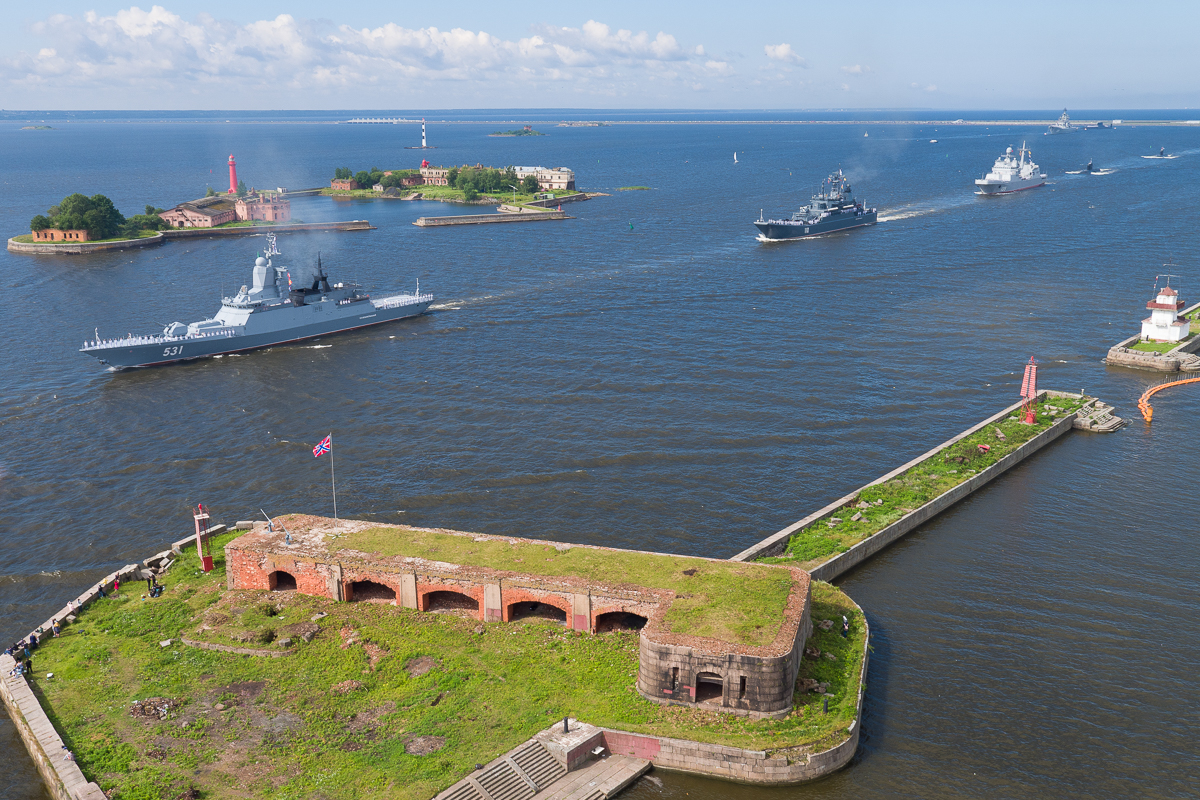
Passage of warships to Kronstadt

Since 2017, by the decree of the President of Russia dated 27 July 2017, the tradition of holding the "Main Naval Parade" in St. Petersburg on the Navy Day has been restored. Prior to 2017, in Soviet and Russian Federation times the previously held annual St. Petersburg Navy Day parade was not so specifically named. The parade is composed of ships and sailors representing the several fleets and the Caspian Flotilla with small ships and submarines in the Neva River and the larger ones arrayed off Kronshtadt in the Gulf of St. Petersburg. It is celebrated annually on the last Sunday of July during the Navy Day holiday.

== Deployments from 2018 ==
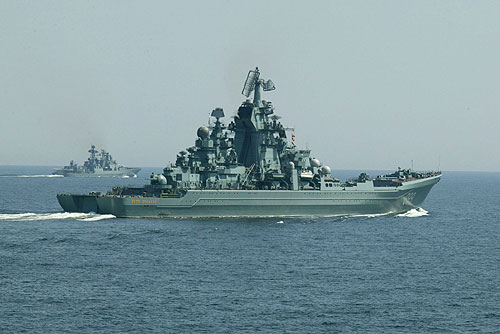
The nuclear-powered missile cruiser Peter the Great during a naval exercise

=== Ocean Shield ===
In the years 2018–2021, the Russian Navy has been organizing central annual naval exercise called Ocean Shield.

Between 1–8 September 2018, Ocean Shield exercise was held for the first time. Unlike 2019 and 2020 exercises, conducted in the Baltic Sea, the first exercise took place in the Mediterranean Sea. 26 ships, 2 submarines and 34 aircraft were included. Among participants were cruiser Marshal Ustinov, destroyers Smetlivy and Severomorsk, frigates Admiral Grigorovich, Admiral Essen, Admiral Makarov, Pytlivy and Yaroslav Mudry, corvettes Vishny Volochyok, Grad Sviyazhsk and Veliky Ustyug and conventional submarines Kolpino and Velikiy Novgorod.

The aircraft present included Tu-160 bombers, Tu-142 and Il-38 anti-submarine aircraft and Su-33 and MiG-29K maritime fighters. This was the largest Russian naval exercise in the Mediterranean Sea of the post-Cold War era and the largest Russian post-Cold War naval exercise in the far sea zone. In terms of distant location and number of capital ships participating it's comparable only to June 2021 exercises of the Pacific Fleet off the Hawaii islands.

Organized between 1–9 August 2019, the second Ocean Shield exercise was the exercise with the largest number of participating ships (69 ships, including 49 warships and 20 support ships) in the independent Russia and took place in the Baltic Sea. The 22 known ships of the exercise "Ocean Shield 2019" include cruiser Marshal Ustinov, destroyer Severomorsk and frigate Admiral Gorshkov of the Northern Fleet, as well as Baltic Fleet's frigate Yaroslav Mudry, corvettes Steregushchy, Soobrazitelny, Stoykiy, Boikiy, Passat, Geyzer, Serpukhov, Mitishchi, Chuvashiya, Morshansk, Liven, Urengoy, R-257 and LSTs Aleksandr Shabalin, Kaliningrad, Minsk and Korolyov, as well as nuclear submarine Smolensk. Other possible participants include ships, participating in the July Naval Parade in St. Petersburg, i.e. frigate Admiral Kasatonov, corvettes Gremyashchy and Sovetsk, submarine Kronshtadt and minesweepers Ivan Antonov, Aleksandr Obukhov and Pavel Khenov.

On 3 August 2020, third Ocean Shield exercise started in the Baltic Sea and included Northern Fleet's destroyer Vice-Admiral Kulakov and LST Pyotr Morgunov and Baltic Fleet's corvettes Steregushchy, Boikiy and Stoikiy.

=== Combined-fleet exercises ===
==== June 2021 ====
In 2021, no usual Ocean Shield exercise was conducted in August or September in the Baltic Sea. However, in June, the Pacific, Northern and Black Sea fleets conducted large-scale exercises. In mid June, four Russian cruisers and four destroyers were simultaneously at sea, or all operational large surface combatants except destroyer Severomorsk, which was probably the first time in the post-Cold war era. A complex large-scale exercise took place in the central Pacific Ocean, where the Russian Navy conducted possibly the strongest exercise of the post-Soviet era.

It took place prior to the 2021 Putin-Biden summit, similarly to Aport and Atrina exercises that were held in 1985 and 1987 prior to the Geneva and Washington summits of Gorbachev and Reagan to improve Soviet negotiation position. Officially, however, it was stated that the exercise is an answer to the exercise Agile Dagger 2021 of the US Pacific Fleet, employing one third of the operational submarines of the US Pacific Fleet.

In the Barents Sea, cruisers Marshal Ustinov and Pyotr Veliky, destroyer Vice-admiral Kulakov and submarines Kaluga, Gepard and Dmitry Donskoy were active.

The location of the exercise in the Pacific Ocean in the vicinity of 23°, -170°

Between 7 and 24 June, a large-scale exercise was conducted by the Pacific Fleet in the central Pacific Ocean, being the first post-Cold war Russian naval exercise in that area (minor exceptions being destroyer Admiral Panteleev taking part in RIMPAC-2012 exercise and frigate Admiral Gorshkov sailing near Hawaii in 2019). It included cruiser Varyag, destroyers Marshal Shaposhnikov and Admiral Panteleyev, corvettes Sovershenny, Gromky and Aldar Tsydenzhapov, (a) nuclear submarine(s) (likely Omsk and Kuzbass) and intelligence ship Kareliya.

The exercise started in the central Pacific Ocean on 10 June, and on 21 June the ships 2500 nautical miles southeast of the Kuril islands simulated an attack on the enemy carrier strike group. Prior to that, the ships operated in two groups, sailing at 300 nautical miles from each other, one of them playing the role of enemy. The largest auxiliary ship of the Russian Navy Marshal Krylov also took part in the exercise and acted as a command ship for the commander of the exercise, rear admiral Konstantin Kabantsev, commander of Primorskaya Flotilla, as well as hospital ship Irtysh and MiG-31 interceptors and Il-38 and Tu-142 anti-submarine aircraft.

On 24 June, the final day of the exercise, three Tu-95 bombers, several Tu-22M bombers, escorted by interceptors MiG-31BM and two Il-78 tankers flew to the central Pacific Ocean as well. The Tu-95s delivered conditional strikes against enemy's critical infrastructure and Tu-22M delivered strikes against enemy's conditional carrier strike group together with Varyag and Marshal Shaposhnikov.

An additional destroyer Admiral Tributs was deployed to the South China Sea, accompanying nuclear submarine Nerpa.

On 18 June 2021, the Black Sea Fleet deployed cruiser Moskva to the Mediterranean Sea, which, amid deployment of Queen Elizabeth to the Eastern Mediterranean, took part in an unprecedented anti-ship exercise with bombers Tu-22M and interceptors MiG-31K both deployed to Syria for the first time in May and June. A MiG-31K reportedly fired a Kinzhal missile against a ground target in Syria, while a newest air defence system S-500 was reportedly tested at Khmeymim airbase and obtained a lock on F-35 fighter from Queen Elizabeth. The exercise included rocket fire 30 km away from Queen Elizabeth.

==== January–February 2022 ====
In January–February 2022 large-scale exercise of all Russian fleets took place with some 140 warships and support ships.

In the Northern Fleet it included two task groups. First, cruiser Marshal Ustinov, destroyer Vice-Admiral Kulakov and frigate Admiral Kasatonov, as well as tanker Vyazma and tug SB-406 were deployed to the southwest of Ireland, conducting first Russian post-Cold war naval exercise west of British isles. Second, destroyer Severomorsk, frigate Admiral Gorshkov, LST Ivan Gren, nuclear submarine Severodvinsk, diesel-electric submarine Kaluga, corvettes Snezhnogorsk and Brest, as well as support ships operated in the Barents Sea. Additionally, three LSTs were deploying to the Black Sea (Olenogorsky Gornyak, Georgiy Pobedonosets and Pyotr Morgunov).

In the Pacific Fleet, cruiser Varyag, destroyer Admiral Tributs and tanker Boris Butoma were deployed to the Indian Ocean, participating in the third Russo-Sino-Iranian naval exercise, first Russo-Chinese naval exercise away from Russian/Chinese coast that took place in the western Indian Ocean and will finally strengthen Mediterranean squadron. Additionally, submarine Volkhov fired a Kalibr missile in the Sea of Japan and two Tu-142 performed flight above the Okhotsk Sea.

In the Baltic Fleet, corvettes Soobrazitelny and Stoykiy were deployed to the Northern Sea, while Zeleny Dol, Mytishchi, Odintsovo, Aleksin, Kabardino-Balkariya were active in the Baltic Sea. Additionally, three LSTs were deploying to the Black Sea: Korolyov, Minsk and Kaliningrad and intelligence ship Vasily Tatishchev to the Mediterranean Sea, where it will monitor three-carrier exercise with CVN Harry Truman, Cavour and Charles de Gaulle in February 2022.

In the Black Sea Fleet, an exercise was conducted by frigates Admiral Essen, Ladnyy, corvettes Ingushetiya, Grayvoron, Naberezhnye Chelny, R-60, Yeysk, Suzdalets and other ships, totally around 20 ships.

=== Annual exercise ===
Russia organises a central military exercise for September each year.

During Zapad 2021, in Northern Fleet two surface groups were active: Admiral Ushakov and Admiral Kasatonov in the Barents Sea (along with coastal systems Bal and Bastion-P) and Severomorsk in the Arctic (along with LST Georgiy Pobedonosets, tug Pamir and tanker Sergey Osipov), as well as submarines Orel and Verkhoturye (along with minesweepers Yelnya, Soloyevetskiy, Yunga, Yadrin and Kotelnich in two groups). In the Baltic Fleet, frigate Yaroslav Mudry, corvettes Steregushchy and Stoykiy and submarine Dmitrov were active (along with coastal system Bal).

=== Barents Sea ===
On 22 February 2021, the Northern Fleet conducted an exercise in which cruiser Marshal Ustinov sailed in Varanger Fjord in the area of the Russia–Norway maritime border, becoming the first Russian warship to do so in the post-Cold War era. Sailing was speculated to be response to the US bombers (B-1B) landing in Norway on the same day for the first time.

Other ships active in the area in January–February 2021 included destroyer Severomorsk, frigate Admiral Gorshkov with the tug Altay, nuclear submarine Severodvinsk (that launched a Kalibr missile), corvettes Aysberg, Snezhnogorsk, Yunga and Brest, and salvage vessel Georgiy Titov with deep-submergence rescue vehicle AS-34.

=== Atlantic ===
South of Gibraltar, in September–October 2021 Russian Navy deployed destroyer Vice-Admiral Kulakov (along tanker Akademik Pashin and tug Altai) that visited Praia, Capo Verde and performed anti-piracy exercise in the Gulf of Guinea. It was the first deployment of a Russian warship south of Gibraltar since Admiral Gorshkov's 2019 world circumnavigation.

=== North Atlantic and Mediterranean Sea ===
In February 2008 a Russian Northern Fleet naval task force completed a two-month deployment in the Mediterranean Sea and the North Atlantic which started on 4 December 2007. The operation was the first large-scale Russian Navy deployment to the Atlantic and the Mediterranean in 15 years. The task force included the Admiral Kuznetsov-class aircraft carrier Admiral Kuznetsov, the Udaloy-class destroyers Admiral Levchenko and Admiral Chabanenko, and the Slava-class guided missile cruiser Moskva, as well as auxiliary vessels. During the operation the navy practiced rescue and counter-terror operations, reconnaissance, and missile and bomb strikes on the (theoretical) enemy's naval task force. Over 40 Russian Air Force aircraft took part in joint exercises with the navy as well.

- In October 2008, a naval task group from the Northern Fleet, comprising the nuclear-powered missile cruiser Pyotr Velikiy, the large ASW ship Admiral Chabanenko, and support ships, left their homeport of Severomorsk in northern Russia on 22 September and sailed into the northern Atlantic, having covered a distance of 1,000 nautical miles (1,900 km) in a week. Russian warships were scheduled to participate in joint naval exercises with the Venezuelan Navy in the Caribbean on 10–14 November, in line with the 2008 training program, and in order to expand military cooperation with foreign navies. These exercises actually took place on 1 December.
- 11 October 2008, Russian warships bound for Venezuela, including the nuclear-powered cruiser Pyotr Velikiy, put in at the Libyan port of Tripoli for resupply.
- From Venezuela Petr Velikiy proceeded alone to a port call in Cape Town, South Africa, then participated in the INDRA-2009 exercise off western India, briefly engaged in counter-piracy operations in the Gulf of Aden, and returned to its homeport of Severomorsk in March 2009. The other ships in company returned to their home base in the Northern Fleet.
- A group of Pacific Fleet ships arrived in the Mediterranean Sea on 15 May 2013 having sailed from Vladivostok on 19 March 2013. Admiral Panteleyev, the Ropucha-class landing ships Peresvet and Admiral Nevelskoy, the tanker Pechenga and the rescue tug Fotiy Krylov augmented the Russian Navy's grouping there, and carried out tasks in the Black Sea and Mediterranean Sea. The Pacific Fleet ships practiced activities jointly with forces from other Russian navy fleets and made a number of business calls at ports in the region, including a call at Limassol, Cyprus on 17 May 2013.
- The Baltic Fleet Ropucha-class landing ships Kaliningrad, Aleksandr Shabalin and Azov arrived at Novorossiysk naval base on 14 May 2013 having completed their duties in the Mediterranean. The Baltic Fleet ships spent several weeks at Novorossiysk undergoing checks and maintenance and replenishing supplies before resuming their duties in the Mediterranean.
- The Northern Fleet's Udaloy-class destroyer Vice-Admiral Kulakov was reported to be heading for the Atlantic on 20 May 2013 after completing a visit to Norway. The ship had been taking part in the Russian-Norwegian Pomor-2013 exercise and is expected to take on supplies from the tanker Vyazma while at anchor in the North Sea before undertaking a lengthy voyage in the north eastern regions of the Atlantic Ocean.
- On 1 June 2013, Navy Commander Adm Viktor Chirkov said that the aircraft carrier Admiral Kuznetsov is "expected to put out and perform a number of missions in an offshore oceanic zone as part of a group. Northern Fleet naval pilots will perform a number of missions on board this cruiser during the long-range mission." He also stated that the ship's deployment might be as part of a permanent operational group in the Mediterranean. In preparing for the deployment the ships' airwing would not be using the NITKA pilot training facility located in Crimea, Ukraine.
- On 17 February 2017, the Russian Navy surveillance vessel SSV-175 Viktor Leonov was cruising international waters off the East Coast of the United States. Viktor Leonov is outfitted with a variety of high-tech spying equipment designed to intercept signals intelligence. It first appeared off Delaware and, then moved south of the US submarine base at Groton, Connecticut collecting electronic signals.

=== Syria ===
- Sequentially having lost naval support facility access in Albania, Yugoslavia, and Egypt, in 1971 the Soviet Navy began operating from a leased facility in Tartus, Syria.
- In September 2008, it was reported that Russia and Syria conducted talks about permitting Russia to develop and enlarge its naval base in Syria in order to establish a stronger naval presence in the Mediterranean, and amidst the deteriorating Russia relations with the west in conjunction with the 2008 South Ossetia war and the plans to deploy US missile defence shield in Poland, it has even been asserted that President Assad has agreed to Tartus port's conversion into a permanent Middle East base for Russia's nuclear-armed warships. Moscow and Damascus additionally announced that it would be renovating the port, although there was no mention in the Syrian press.
- On 22 September 2008, Russian Navy spokesman Igor Dygalo said the nuclear-powered Pyotr Velikiy cruiser, accompanied by three other ships, sailed from the Northern Fleet's base of Severomorsk. The ships will cover about 15,000 nautical miles (28,000 km) to conduct joint maneuvers with the Venezuelan navy. Dygalo refused to comment on Monday's report in the daily Izvestia claiming that the ships were to make a stopover in the Syrian port of Tartus on their way to Venezuela. Russian officials said the Soviet-era base there was being renovated to serve as a foothold for a permanent Russian navy presence in the Mediterranean.
- In late November 2011, Pravda and Reuters wrote that a naval flotilla led by the aircraft carrier Admiral Kuznetsov would sail to its naval base in Tartus as a show of support for the al-Assad regime. Such a visit is not possible because the lengths of all of Russia's current modern warships exceed the size of the two 100 meter piers located at the Russian leasehold in Tartus. (see next paragraph)
- On 29 November 2011, Army General Nikolay Makarov, Chief of the Russian General Staff, said that sending ships of the Russian Navy to the Mediterranean Sea is linked to exercises and not to the situation in Syria. "In the event of necessity, namely to carry out repairs, to take water and food on board and to allow rest for the crews, Russian ships may visit Tartus but in this case this has not been included in the plan of the trip," the Interfax source said. He also noted that the size of Admiral Kuznetsov does not allow it to moor in Tartus because the port does not have suitable infrastructure, i.e., large enough mooring.

=== Sudan ===
- On 23 July 2019, Russia and Sudan signed an agreement on establishment of a Russian naval base in Port Sudan in Khartoum and, on 1 December 2020, in Moscow. On 25 June 2021, Russian prime minister Mishustin submitted the agreement for ratification. On 12 July, Sudan was preparing for ratification too.
- Between 28 February and 2 May 2021, a number of Russian ships called at Port Sudan, beginning with frigate Admiral Grigorovich in what was the first visit of a Russian warship to Sudan in the modern history. This was followed by corvette Stoikiy and tug Kola on 19 March, signals intelligence ship Ivan Khurs on 10 April, signals intelligence ship Vasily Tatishchev and its accompanying repair ship PM-138 on 2 May.

=== Algeria ===
Russia and Algeria hold annual naval exercise at the end of the year.

- Between 16 and 17 November 2021, Russo-Algerian naval exercise was conducted. Russian Black Sea Fleet's frigate Admiral Grigorovich, patrol ship Vasily Bykov and seagoing tug SB-742 took part, as well as Algerian frigate Harrad, training vessel La Sammam and rescue vessel El Munjid.

=== Egypt ===
Russia and Egypt have held an annual naval exercise at the end of the year since 2015. Usually, the exercise is conducted in the Eastern Mediterranean Sea, an exception being 2020, when the exercise took place in the Black Sea. From 3–10 December 2021, another Russo-Egyptian naval exercise, Bridge of Friendship, took place in the Eastern Mediterranean Sea. The Russian task force comprised frigate Admiral Grigorovich, patrol ship Dmitry Rogachev and sea-going tug SB-742.

=== Caribbean Sea ===
On 8 September 2008, it was announced that the Pyotr Velikiy would sail to the Caribbean Sea in order to participate in naval exercises with the Venezuelan Navy. This represented the first major Russian show of force in that sea since the end of the Cold War. On 22 September the Kirov-class nuclear missile cruiser Pyotr Velikiy and the Udaloy class large anti-submarine ship Admiral Chabanenko, accompanied by support vessels, left their home port of Severomorsk for naval exercises with Venezuela scheduled for early November 2008. On 25 November 2008, a group of warships from Russia's Northern Fleet arrived at the Venezuelan port of La Guaira.

=== East Africa: Somali Coast ===
- On 24 September 2008, the Russian frigate Neustrashimy left its home base at Baltiysk, Kaliningrad Oblast, Russia, for counter-piracy operations near the Somali coast. (Note: The Ukrainian merchant vessel Faina was seized by Somali pirates on 25 September. The deployment of the Neustrashimy was not in response to the seizure of the Faina.)
- From 11 January to 17 March 2009, the Admiral Vinogradov took up the counter-piracy mission from the Neustrashimy and upon completion took a course home to Vladivostok by way of a port visit to Jakarta, Indonesia 24–28 March 2009.
- From 26 April to 7 June 2009, the Pacific Fleet destroyer Admiral Panteleyev took up counter-piracy duties in the Gulf of Aden, having left Vladivostok at the end of March 2009 to relieve the Admiral Vinogradov. It returned to Vladivostok on 1 July.

=== Indian Ocean and Arabian Sea ===
Main article: Cam Ranh Air Base

- On 11 January 2009, Army General Nikolai Makarov, Chief of the Russian General Staff, announced that the Kirov-class nuclear-powered cruiser Pyotr Velikiy and five other ships would take part in exercises with the Indian Navy in late January 2009.
- In 2021, Black Sea Fleet's intelligence ship Kildin entered port Oman on 1 November. Besides, in summer, the newly built frigate Gremyashchy and Kilo (Varshavanka) class diesel-electric submarines Petropavlovsk-Kamchatsky and Volkhov transited Indian Ocean on their way from the Baltic Sea to the Pacific Ocean.

=== East Asia ===
Since 2012, Russia and China have conducted an annual naval exercise. In even years, they take place off Chinese coast (usually in the Yellow Sea), and in odd years off Russian coast (usually in the Sea of Japan). In 2015 and 2017, in addition to the exercises in the Sea of Japan, additional exercises in the Mediterranean and Baltic Sea, respectively, were held. In 2021, for the first time the exercise surpassed the defensive character as Russian and Chinese warships passed through the Tsugaru Strait between Japanese islands Hokkaido and Honshu.

- On 23 October 2021, Russian and Chinese Navies conducted first ever joint patrol. Five warships of each navy participated, including two destroyers, two corvettes and a command ship. Russian Navy was represented by destroyers Admiral Panteleyev and Admiral Tributs, corvettes Gromky and Geroy Rossiyskoy federatsii Aldar Tsydenzhapov and tracking ship Marshal Krylov. The patrol group passed through the Tsugaru Strait. Joint Russo-Chinese operations imply readiness of both superpowers to cooperate to limit the power of the American-led order in the Asia-Pacific region.
- From 1–3 December 2021, the first naval exercise between Russia and ASEAN occurred in the Indonesian territorial waters. Russia was represented by destroyer Admiral Panteleyev, Vietnam by frigate Ly Thai To, Indonesia by frigate Raden Eddy Martadinata, Malaysia by frigate Lekiu, Singapore by corvette Vigour, Brunei by off-shore patrol vessel Daruttaqwa, Thailand by frigate Kraburi and Myanmar by frigate Kyansittha, while Philippines joined as an observer.

== See also ==
- List of active Russian Navy ships
- Russian Armed Forces
- Future of the United States Navy
- Future of the Royal Navy
- Future of the French Navy
- Future of the Spanish Navy
- Future of the Royal Australian Navy
- Future of the Brazilian Navy
- Future of the Indian Navy
- Future of the Royal Netherlands Navy

== See also ==
- History of the Russian Navy
- Future of the Russian Navy
- Russian Naval Academy
- List of ships of the line of Russia
- List of aircraft carriers of Russia and the Soviet Union
- List of Russian Navy cruisers
- List of Russian Navy equipment
- List of ships of Russia by project number
- List of Soviet and Russian submarine classes
- List of active Russian Navy ships for current Order of Battle of the Russian Navy
- Russian Hydrographic Service
- Russian torpedoes
