= List of equipment in the Russian Navy =

This is a list of Russian Navy equipment:

Class	Image	Individual ships	Notes
Aircraft carrier
Kuznetsov		Admiral Kuznetsov	
Battlecruiser
Kirov		Admiral Nakhimov	
Kirov		Pyotr Velikiy	

- Submarine
  - Delta-class nuclear ballistic missile submarine
  - Typhoon-class nuclear ballistic missile submarine
  - Borey (Dolgorukiy)-class nuclear ballistic missile submarine
  - Oscar-class nuclear cruise missile submarine
  - Sierra-class nuclear attack submarine
  - Victor-class nuclear attack submarine
  - Akula-class nuclear attack submarine
  - Yasen (Severodvinsk)-class nuclear attack submarine
  - Kilo-class diesel-electric submarine
  - Improved Kilo-class diesel-electric submarine
  - Lada (Petersburg)-class diesel-electric submarine
- Cruiser
  - Kara-class cruiser
  - Slava-class cruiser
- Destroyer
  - Kashin-class destroyer
  - Sovremennyy-class destroyer
  - Udaloy-class destroyer
- Frigate
  - Burevestnik (Krivak)-class frigate
  - Neustrashimy-class frigate
  - Tatarstan/Gepard-class frigate
  - Admiral Gorshkov-class frigate
- Corvette
  - Steregushchiy-class corvette
  - Parchim-class corvette
  - Nanuchka-class corvette
  - Tarantul-class corvette
  - Grisha-class corvette
  - Buyan class corvette
  - Buyan-M-class corvette
- Hovercraft
  - Bora-class guided missile hovercraft
  - Zubr-class LCAC
- Landing ship
  - Alligator-class landing ship
  - Ropucha-class landing ship
  - Polnocny-class landing ship
  - Ivan Gren-class landing ship
  - Dyugon-class landing craft

== Current naval aircraft ==
Aircraft	Origin	Type	Versions	In service	Notes
Su-27S	Soviet Union	Patrol fighter		From 1985 to present	
MiG-29K	Russia	Carrier fighter		From 2013 to present	
Su-33	Russia	Carrier fighter		From 1998 to present	
Su-25UTG	Soviet Union	Carrier trainer		From 1988 to present	

== Current naval helicopters ==
Aircraft	Origin	Type	Versions	In service	Notes
Ka-27PL	Soviet Union	Helix anti-submarine helicopter		From 1982 to present	
Ka-27PS	Soviet Union	Helix search and rescue helicopter		From 1982 to present	
Ka-28	Soviet Union	Helix anti-submarine helicopter		From 1982 to present	Export version of Ka-27
Ka-29	Soviet Union	Assault transport helicopter		From 1987 to present	
Ka-31	Russia	AEW helicopter		From 1995 to present	
Ka-35	Russia	AEW Helicopter		From 2015 to present	
Mi-14	Soviet Union	Anti-submarine helicopter (medium transport helicopter)		Former operator	

== Vehicles (naval infantry) ==
- T-72B
- T-80B
- BTR-80(A) and BTR-82AM
- 2S1 Gvozdika
- BMP-3F
- MT-LB

== See also ==
- List of battlecruisers of Russia
