= Choe Hyon-class destroyer =

Class of North Korean destroyers

Class overview
- Builders: Nampo Shipyard; Hambuk Shipyard
- Operators: Korean People's Navy
- Built: 2024–present
- In commission: 2026–present
- Planned: 4
- Building: 2
- Completed: 2
- Active: 2

General characteristics
- Type: Guided-missile destroyer
- Displacement: 5,000 t (4,900 long tons)
- Length: ~144–145 metres (472 ft 5 in – 475 ft 9 in)
- Beam: ~16 m (52 ft 6 in)
- Sensors & processing systems: Phased array radars; Type 362 air/surface search radar; 3 × fire-control radars; 2 × navigation radars; Hull-mounted sonar; IFF system
- Electronic warfare & decoys: 4 × countermeasures dispensers; R-ESM; R-ECM
- Armament: 1 × 127 mm (5.0 in) or 130 mm (5.1 in) naval gun; 1 × Pantsir-ME CIWS; 2 × 30? mm CIWS; 8 x 1 14.5mm KPV heavy machine gun; 88 × VLS cells of various sizes for guided missiles; 4 × 4 anti-ship missile launchers; 2 × 2 533 mm (21.0 in) DTA-53 torpedo launchers
- Aircraft carried: 1 × helicopter or UAV
- Aviation facilities: Flight deck
- Notes: References

The Choe Hyon-class destroyer (Korean: 《최현》급다목적구축함) is a class of guided-missile destroyers of the Korean People's Navy (KPN). The first vessel, the Choe Hyon, was unveiled by the Korean People's Army on 30 December 2024. The second ship, Kang Kon, capsized during launch but was eventually restored to upright position and relaunched on 12 June 2025.

== History ==
During Kim Jong Un's visit to the Nampo Shipyard in February 2024, the North Korean leader said that increasing the country's naval power is the most important issue in defending its seas, and pushed ahead with the planned warships building, completing them by the end of current Five-Year Plan in January 2026. The Choe Hyon class is likely part of the warship building program.

On 25 April 2025, the first ship, Choe Hyon was launched. The second ship, Kang Kon, was unsuccessfully launched on 21 May. On 12 June, it was successful in the relaunch attempt, and Kim Jong Un approved a plan to build two more 5,000-ton destroyers in 2026. A month later, on 21 July, workers of Nampo Shipyard began construction of the third ship, planned for completion on the 81st Party Foundation Day in October 2026.

On 12 April 2026, Kim Jong Un claimed that construction of a fourth ship has begun.

At the Choe Hyon's commissioning ceremony on 23 June 2026, Kim Jong Un revealed North Korea's five-year plan to build two Choe Hyon-class destroyer each year, alongside a 10,000-ton cruiser.

On 6 September 2026, the commissioning ceremony of Kang Kon took place.

== Development ==
=== Name ===
The lead ship was named after Choe Hyon, a North Korean general who served as a general in the Northeast Counter-Japanese United Army and later became the Minister of the People's Armed Forces of North Korea. The second ship was named after Korean War general Kang Kon.

=== Design ===
It is the first surface vessel in the Korean People's Navy to be equipped with a phased array radar and a vertical launching system.

It is reportedly equipped with the Russian anti-submarine complex 91RE1 Otvet. It is launched from 533mm torpedo tubes on the Choe Hyon-class, while the Otvet is launched on Russian surface ships from VLS and on submarines from torpedo tubes.

== Ships in the class ==
Name	Hull no.	Builder	Laid down	Launched	Commissioned	Status
Choe Hyon	51	Nampo Shipyard, Nampo	May 2024	25 April 2025	23 June 2026	Active
Kang Kon	52	Hambuk Shipyard, Chongjin	May 2024	12 June 2025	6 September 2026	Active
Unnamed		Nampo Shipyard, Nampo	21 July 2025			Under construction
Unnamed						Under construction

== See also ==
- List of destroyer classes in service

Equivalent destroyers of the same era

- Visakhapatnam class
- Hobart class
- Asahi class
- Type 052D
