= List of battlecruisers of Russia =

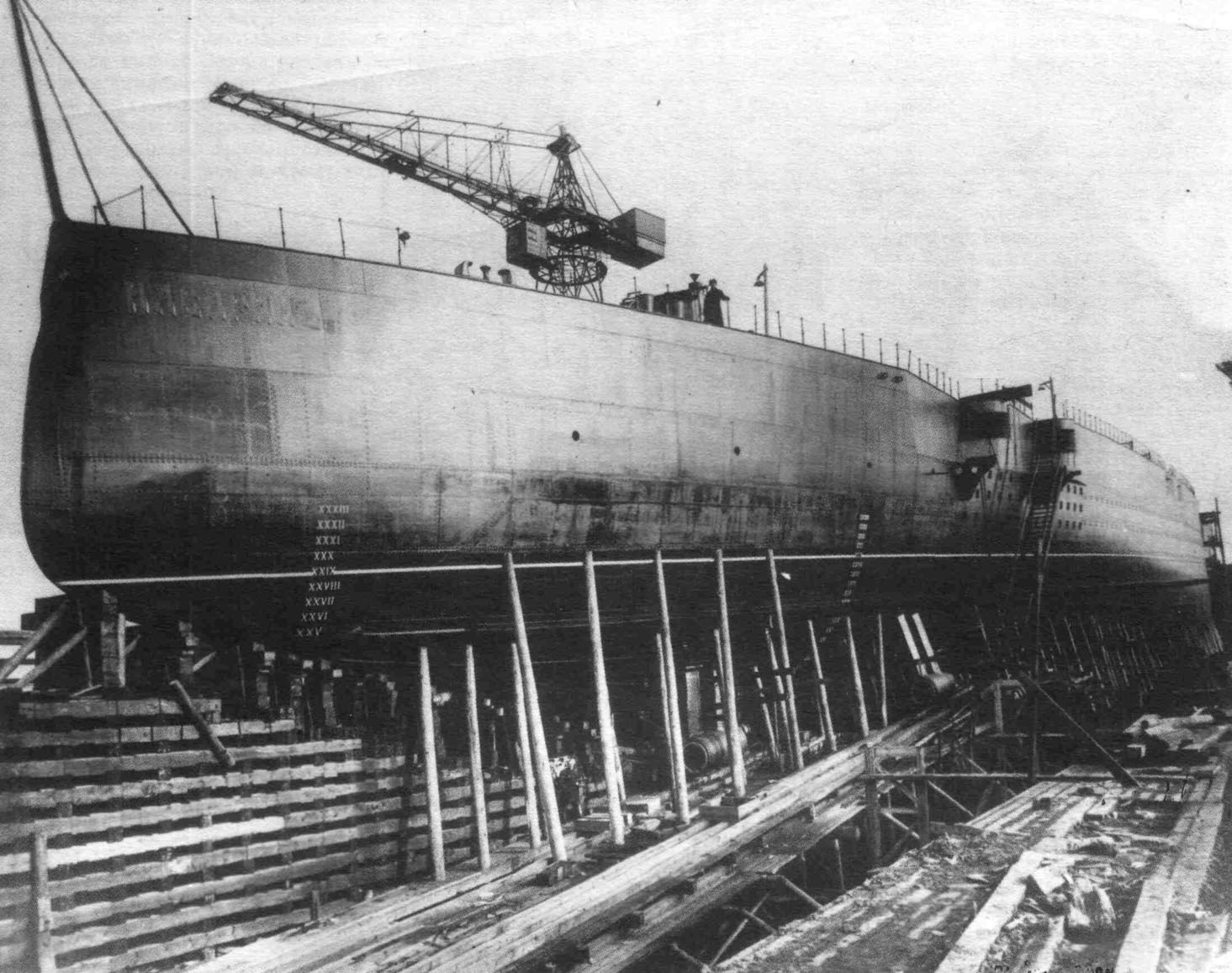
Borodino-class vessel under construction in Saint Petersburg in 1916

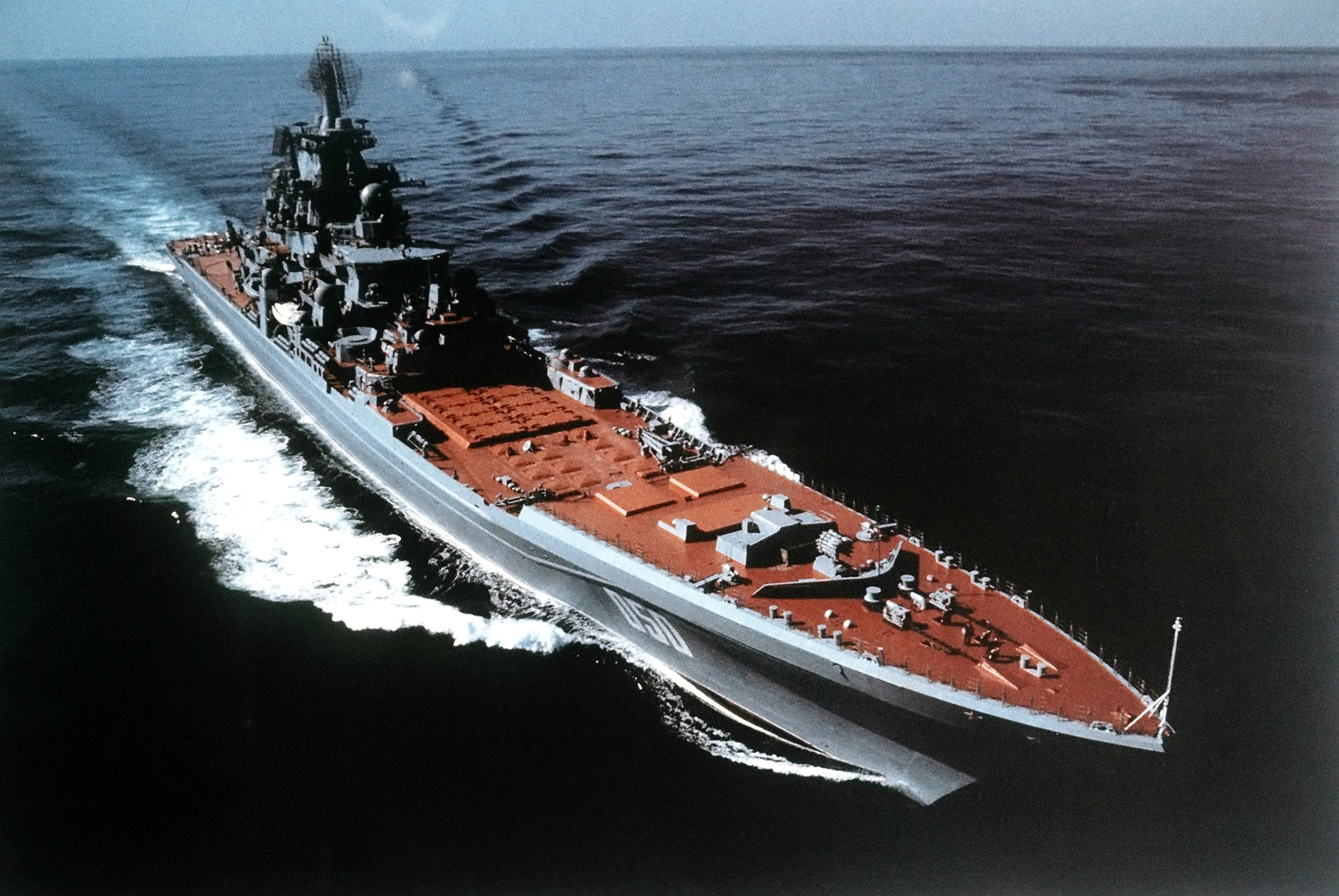
Kirov-class missile cruiser at sea in 1986

After the end of the Russo-Japanese War of 1905, the Russian Naval General Staff decided that it needed a squadron of fast "armored cruisers" (Броненосный крейсер; bronenosnyy kreyser) (Note: The Borodino-class ships were formally known as armored cruisers until they were redesignated as battlecruisers (линейный крейсер; lineinyi kreiser) by an order of 29 July 1915.) that could use their speed to maneuver into position to engage the head of the enemy's battle line, much as Admiral Tōgō had done during the Battle of Tsushima against the Russian fleet. This concept was very different from the primary roles for the battlecruiser envisioned by the British Royal Navy and the Imperial German High Seas Fleet, which consisted of scouting for the main battle fleet and attacking enemy reconnaissance forces. The Royal Navy came to the same conclusion and developed the Queen Elizabeth-class fast battleships that could force battle on an enemy fleet and had enough protection to attack any type of ship. However, World War I and the Russian Civil War interrupted the construction of the Russian Borodino-class ships and all were scrapped.

Twenty years later the Soviet Navy issued a requirement for a ship capable of dealing with enemy cruisers, but the design began to grow as it was modified to allow for combat with German pocket battleships on even terms, and later modified to gain parity with the Scharnhorst-class battleships. Two ships were laid down in 1939, but development of their new guns lagged significantly behind their construction and six 38-centimeter (15 in) twin-gun turrets were ordered from Germany in 1940. The working drawings for the turrets and guns had not even been received when Operation Barbarossa began in June 1941. The incomplete hulls of both ships were ordered scrapped in 1947.

The Navy revived its requirement for a "cruiser-killer" during the war, but the design process was quite lengthy as questions as to its armament, speed and size were debated. Joseph Stalin was the key supporter of these ships and made many of the important decisions himself, overriding the desires of the Navy. Thus, after his death in 1953, little time was wasted in cancelling the three ships that had been laid down. The hull of the most advanced ship was used as a target and the other two were scrapped on their slipways.

In the 1970s, the Navy initiated a project to construct a nuclear-powered ship capable of accommodating anti-aircraft, anti-ship and anti-submarine guided missiles in a single hull. This type, classed as a "heavy nuclear-powered missile cruiser" by the Soviets, eventually emerged as the largest non-aircraft carrying surface warship built since the end of the Second World War, and was termed in the West as a battlecruiser.

== Key ==
Definitions
Main guns^{α}	The number and type of the main battery guns
Armor	Waterline belt thickness
Displacement	Ship displacement at full load
Propulsion	Number of shafts, type of propulsion system, and top speed generated
Service	The dates work began and finished on the ship and its ultimate fate
Laid down	The date the keel began to be assembled
Launched	The date the ship was launched

^α The Kirov class was fitted with a primarily missile-based main armament; this is reflected in the table with "Main armament" given instead of "Main guns".

== Borodino class ==
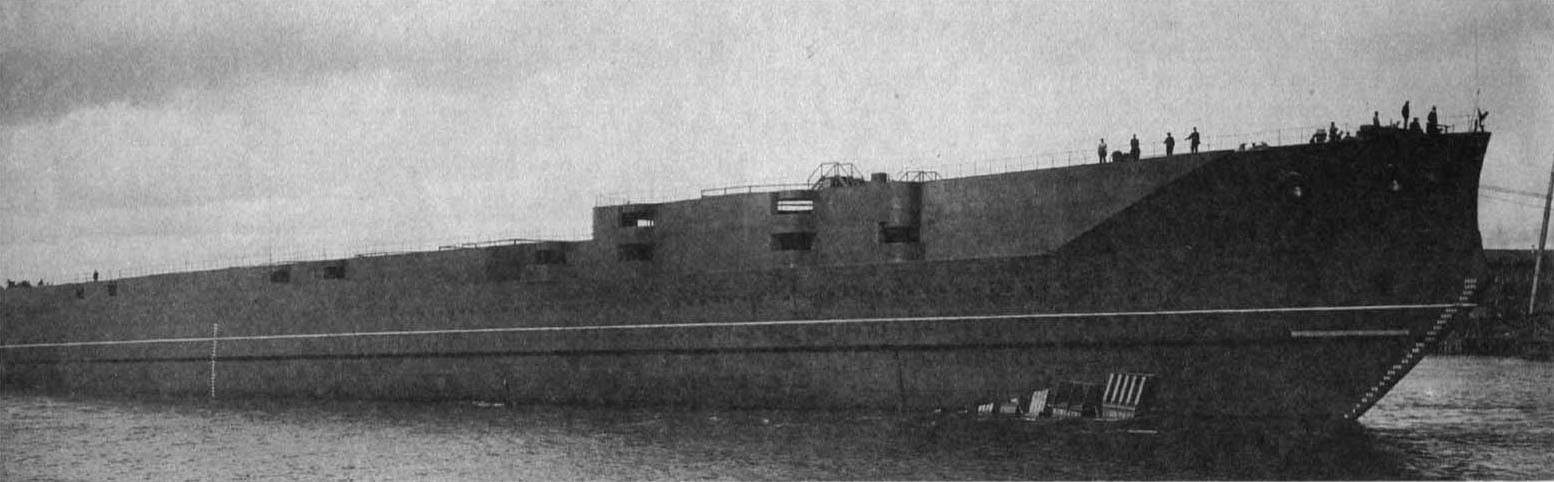
Borodino under construction in 1915

The four Borodino-class battlecruisers (also referred to as Izmail class) of the Imperial Russian Navy were all laid down in December 1912 (Note: All dates used in this article are New Style.) at Saint Petersburg for service with the Baltic Fleet. Construction of the ships was delayed as many domestic factories were already overloaded with orders and some components had to be ordered from abroad. The start of World War I slowed their construction still further as the foreign orders were often not delivered and domestic production was diverted into things more immediately useful for the war effort. The ships were launched in 1915–1916, but the outbreak of the Russian Revolution in 1917 put a stop to their construction, which never resumed. The Soviet Navy gave consideration to completing the ships; initially, Izmail and Borodino were looked at, with a view to finishing one or both to their original design, but the lack of available 12-inch (305 mm) guns, combined with the complexity of the originally designed electrical system, led to the idea being dropped. Subsequently, plans were raised to complete Kinburn and Navarin to a modified design with 16-inch (406 mm) guns, which again failed due to the difficulty in either obtaining guns from overseas, or manufacturing them domestically. Subsequent ideas included converting some of the hulls for cargo or passenger use, which again failed. The Navy made a serious proposal in 1925 to convert Izmail, the ship closest to completion, to an aircraft carrier, but this plan was later cancelled as a result of political maneuvering on the part of the Red Army. Eventually, all four hulls were broken up for scrap; the second, third and fourth were sold to a German company in 1923, while Izmail was broken up in Leningrad in 1931.

Specifications, construction and service data
Ship	Builder	Main guns	Armor	Displacement	Propulsion	Service		
Ship	Builder	Main guns	Armor	Displacement	Propulsion	Laid down	Launched	Fate
Izmail (Russian: Измаил)	Baltic Shipyard, Saint Petersburg	12 × 35.6 cm (14 in)	237.5 mm (9.4 in)	36,646 long tons (37,234 t)	4 screws, 4 geared steam turbines 26.5 knots (49.1 km/h; 30.5 mph)	19 December 1912	22 June 1915	Scrapped, 1931
Borodino (Russian: Бородино)	Admiralty Shipyard, Saint Petersburg	12 × 35.6 cm (14 in)	237.5 mm (9.4 in)	36,646 long tons (37,234 t)	4 screws, 4 geared steam turbines 26.5 knots (49.1 km/h; 30.5 mph)	19 December 1912	31 July 1915	Sold for scrap, 21 August 1923
Kinburn (Russian: Кинбурн)	Baltic Shipyard, Saint Petersburg	12 × 35.6 cm (14 in)	237.5 mm (9.4 in)	36,646 long tons (37,234 t)	4 screws, 4 geared steam turbines 26.5 knots (49.1 km/h; 30.5 mph)	19 December 1912	30 October 1915	Sold for scrap, 21 August 1923
Navarin (Russian: Наварин)	Admiralty Shipyard, Saint Petersburg	12 × 35.6 cm (14 in)	237.5 mm (9.4 in)	36,646 long tons (37,234 t)	4 screws, 4 geared steam turbines 26.5 knots (49.1 km/h; 30.5 mph)	19 December 1912	9 November 1916	Sold for scrap, 21 August 1923

== Kronshtadt class ==
Right elevation of Kronshtadt class

In the 1930s the Soviets began development of a large cruiser (Russian: большой крейсер; bol'shoy kreyser) capable of destroying 10,000-long-ton (10,160 t) cruisers built to the limits imposed by the Washington Naval Treaty, which the Soviets had not signed. Several designs were proposed, but rejected by the Navy before the concept was merged with the small battleship (Battleship 'B') then being designed for service with the Baltic and Black Sea Fleets after the Soviets agreed to follow the terms of the Second London Naval Treaty in 1937. The new design was significantly larger and was also tasked with dealing with Germany's so-called "pocket battleships". Four were ordered shortly afterward, but the beginning of the Great Purge in August 1937 hindered the completion of the design process and the project was cancelled in early 1938 after being criticized as too weak in comparison to foreign ships.

Kronshtadt under construction in 1941

The Navy, however, still had a requirement for a ship capable of defeating enemy cruisers and the original concept was revived as Project 69. The proposed size of the ship continually escalated as the requirement was revised to allow it to fight larger ships like the German Scharnhorst-class battleships. The preliminary design was finally approved in January 1939 and two ships were laid down in November 1939, before the detailed design had even been approved.

The Project 69 ships were intended to use a newly designed 305-millimeter (12 in) gun in a new triple turret, but they were both well behind schedule when Joseph Stalin asked the Germans in February 1940 if any triple 283-millimeter (11.1 in) turrets were available for purchase under the German–Soviet Commercial Agreement. When they said no, he then asked if any twin 380-millimeter (15 in) turrets were available instead. Krupp had six incomplete 380mm SK C/34 turrets available that had originally been ordered before the war to rearm the two vessels of the Scharnhorst-class, but which were not used when the plan was cancelled after the start of World War II. A preliminary purchase agreement was made to buy 12 guns and six turrets later that month, well before any studies were made to see if the substitution was even possible. It was later determined that they could be used, so the agreement was finalized in November 1940 with the deliveries scheduled from October 1941 to 28 March 1943.

"Project 69-I" ("Importnyi" – Imported) modified the two ships to use the German guns, even though they still lacked data for the turrets and their barbettes. The detailed design was supposed to be completed by 15 October 1941, but it was rendered moot when the Germans invaded the Soviet Union in June. Neither ship had progressed very far at that time and both had been damaged during the war, so they were ordered scrapped on 24 March 1947 after some thought had been given to completing Kronshtadt as either an aircraft carrier or a mother ship for whalers.

Specifications, construction and service data
Ship	Builder	Main guns	Armor	Displacement	Propulsion	Service		
Ship	Builder	Main guns	Armor	Displacement	Propulsion	Laid down	Launched	Fate
Kronshtadt (Russian: Кронштадт)	Shipyard No. 194, Leningrad	6 × 38 cm (15 in)	230 mm (9.1 in)	42,831 t (42,155 long tons)	3 screws, 3 geared steam turbines, 32 kn (59 km/h; 37 mph)	30 November 1939	—	Ordered scrapped, 24 March 1947
Sevastopol (Russian: Севастополь)	Shipyard No. 200, Nikolaev	6 × 38 cm (15 in)	230 mm (9.1 in)	42,831 t (42,155 long tons)	3 screws, 3 geared steam turbines, 32 kn (59 km/h; 37 mph)	5 November 1939	—	Ordered scrapped, 24 March 1947

== Stalingrad class ==
Side and plan views of the Stalingrad class

The Navy reissued its requirements for a large cruiser to destroy enemy light cruisers in 1943, but none of the designs submitted were acceptable. The requirement was reissued in 1944 for a larger ship and the concept was approved by the Politburo in 1945. However, the Navy and the Shipbuilding Commissariat disagreed about the feasibility of laying down any ships of new design before 1950, so a committee was appointed under the chairmanship of Lavrentiy Beria to resolve the issue. It mostly sided with the Shipbuilding Commissariat, but a program of seven large cruisers was approved later that year. Preliminary design work was not completed until 1948 and the size of the ship ballooned to 40,000 tonnes (39,368 long tons). Stalin intervened several times during the design process and ordered the ship's displacement reduced to 36,500 metric tons (35,924 long tons) and speed increased to 35 knots (65 km/h; 40 mph) as well as specifying its armament as 305 mm guns, rather than the 220 mm (8.7 in) guns preferred by the Navy. All of these changes delayed approval of the detailed design until 1951.

The first ship was begun in November 1951 and the other two followed in 1952; a fourth was apparently ordered from the Severodvinsk shipyard, but was cancelled before being laid down. By this time Stalin's support was the main impetus behind the ships and little time was wasted cancelling them after his death on 5 March 1953. Stalingrad's hull was ordered to be used for weapons tests while the two other ships were scrapped where they lay. The hull was launched in 1954 after it was modified to suit its new role. It was towed from Nikolayev to Sevastopol in 1955, but it grounded at the entrance to Sevastopol Bay. Initial attempts to pull it off the rocks by brute force failed, and the capsizing of the battleship Novorossiysk further delayed salvage work, so that she was not freed until mid-1956. She served as a target for the first generation of Soviet anti-ship missiles and a wide variety of armor-piercing weapons before she was scrapped in the early 1960s, probably 1962.

Specifications, construction and service data
Ship	Builder	Main guns	Armor	Displacement	Propulsion	Service		
Ship	Builder	Main guns	Armor	Displacement	Propulsion	Laid down	Launched	Fate
Stalingrad (Russian: Сталинград)	Shipyard No. 198, Nikolaev	9 × 305 mm (12 in)	180 mm (7.1 in)	42,300 t (41,632 long tons)	4 screws, 4 × geared steam turbines, 35.5 kn (65.7 km/h; 40.9 mph)	November 1951	16 March 1954	Hulk used as target and later scrapped
Moskva (Russian: Москва)	Shipyard No. 189, Leningrad	9 × 305 mm (12 in)	180 mm (7.1 in)	42,300 t (41,632 long tons)	4 screws, 4 × geared steam turbines, 35.5 kn (65.7 km/h; 40.9 mph)	September 1952	—	Scrapped, 1953
Kronshtadt (Russian: Кронштадт) (Note: No name was officially assigned to the third hull, with Soviet sources referring to the ship either as Kronshtadt or Arkhangelsk)	Shipyard No. 402, Severodvinsk	9 × 305 mm (12 in)	180 mm (7.1 in)	42,300 t (41,632 long tons)	4 screws, 4 × geared steam turbines, 35.5 kn (65.7 km/h; 40.9 mph)	October 1952	—	Scrapped, 1953

== Kirov class ==
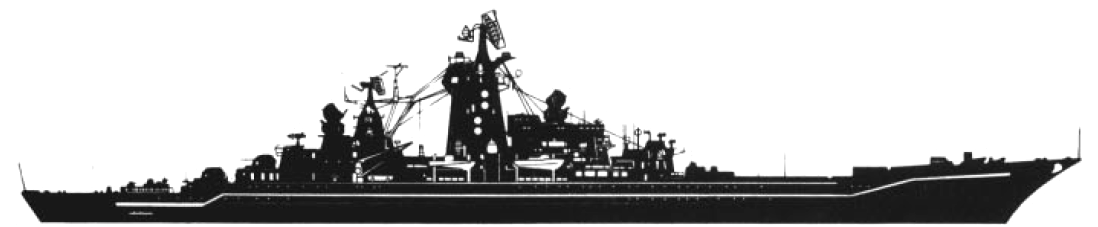
Right elevation of Kirov class

In the 1960s, the Soviet Union originated Project 1144 Orlan, a project intended to design and build a large, nuclear powered anti-submarine vessel. At the time, the Soviets did not envisage that arming surface ships with anti-ship missiles was required, as then current doctrine had it that submarines were the main platform for attacking enemy shipping. However, the sinking of the Israeli destroyer INS Eilat in 1967 by anti-ship missiles fired from an Egyptian missile boat led to a re-think of the use of surface ships in the role. The threat of US Navy surface ships, which were increasingly capable of a range of different missions, led to the idea of a single ship combining anti-aircraft, anti-ship and anti-submarine capabilities crystallising.

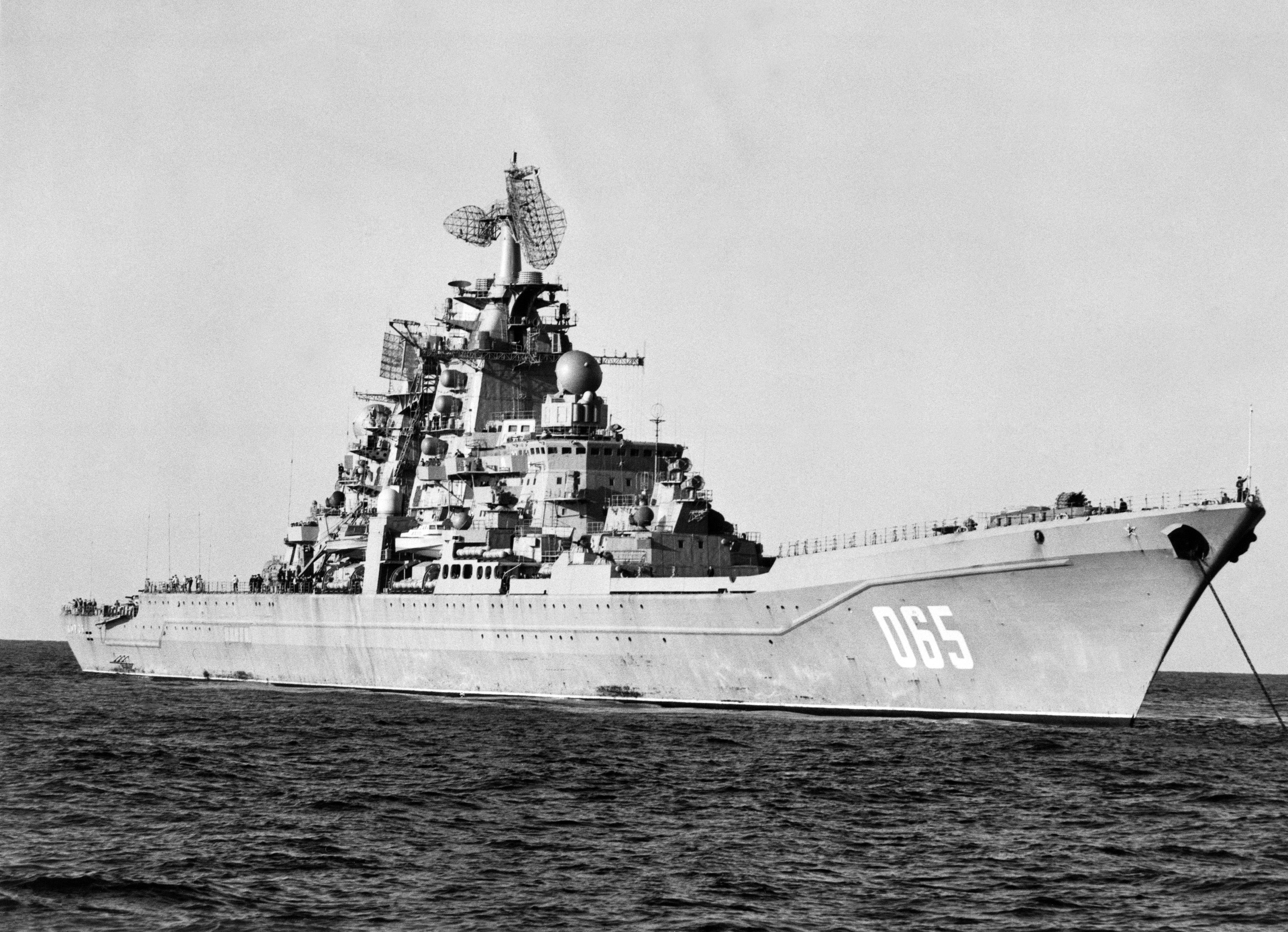
Kirov (later Admiral Ushakov) in 1985

Under the original specifications laid out in 1969, the new ship was originally classified as "nuclear antisubmarine cruiser" (Russian: атомный противолодочный крейсер; atomnyy protivolodochnyy kreyser). The first hull was laid down at the Baltiysky Zavod in Leningrad in March 1974 under the name Kirov. By the time the ship was launched in December 1977, she had been reclassified as a "heavy nuclear-powered guided missile cruiser" (Russian: тяжёлый атомный ракетный крейсер; tyazholyy atomnyy raketnyy kreyser), built around a primary armament of 20 SS-N-19 Shipwreck anti-ship missiles. Following the appearance of Kirov, two more units, Frunze and Kalinin, were commissioned at four-year intervals. When Frunze was commissioned in 1984, it was seen to have a different weapons fit to Kirov, with the pair of single 100 mm guns swapped for a twin 130-millimetre (5.1 in) turret, and the SS-N-14 Silex ASW missile system deleted in favour of adding eight SA-N-9 Gauntlet SAM launchers. In the event, none of the four ships of the class received a completely identical armament fit. Additionally, the hull and propulsion machinery of the Kirov-class was used for the Soviet Navy's C^{3} vessel Ural.

The size of the Kirov class was approximately 28,000-long-ton (28,000 t) full load. This was around the same size as a First World War super-dreadnought battleship, and significantly bigger than any contemporary cruiser design, leading to commentators in the west describing them as "battlecruisers". Their appearance was a major factor in the US Navy reactivating its four Iowa-class battleships in the early 1980s. The fourth unit, Yuri Andropov, was launched in April 1989, with plans advanced for a fifth ship, to be named Kuznetsov. (Note: Kuznetsov was initially named as Dzerzhinsky, then Oktyabrskaya Revolutsiya) However, the fall of the Soviet Union saw funding for the Navy collapse—the fourth ship, renamed as Pyotr Velikiy (Peter the Great), was not commissioned until 1998, while the fifth hull was cancelled, and the remaining three laid up in varying states of disrepair. Although the first ship, Kirov (Note: Kirov was renamed as Admiral Ushakov in 1992, but was restored to its original name in 2004, after having been laid up out of use. The name Admiral Ushakov was transferred to the Sovremenny-class destroyer Besstrashnyy) began a planned overhaul in 1999, this was halted in 2001, with the decision taken to dismantle the ship instead. Kalinin (renamed as Admiral Nakhimov in 1992), considered to be in better condition, was scheduled to undergo a major overhaul to return her to active service by 2021. However, problems in completing the work saw the ships' delivery date pushed back to 2023. Once Admiral Nakhimov has rejoined the fleet, it was planned that Pyotr Velikiy would undergo a similar modernization. Then, in 2023, a report emerged that, owing to the spiralling cost of both its planned major refit, plus the increasing general maintenance costs, Pytor Velikiy would not undergo its planned modernisation and would instead be decommissioned once Admiral Nakhimov was returned to service. However, this remained unconfirmed at the time, with instead it simply being noted that the ship was continuing to undertake operations while an assessment of its condition was being undertaken. The fate of Frunze, renamed as Admiral Lazarev, was less clear, as the intention was to carry out an inspection of the ship to determine its overall condition once work on Admiral Nakhimov was completed. However, in April 2019 it was announced that both Kirov, having already been defuelled, and Admiral Lazarev were to be finally withdrawn and broken up. Admiral Lazarev was sold for scrapping in February 2021, with the contract specifying that the work should be completed by the end of November 2025. In August 2025, following the completion of the ship's major refit, Admiral Nakhimov put to sea for the first time since 1997 to undergo sea trials.

Specifications, construction and service data
Ship		Builder	Main armament		Displacement	Propulsion	Service			
Soviet Navy name	Russian Navy name	Builder	Anti-ship missiles	Guns	Displacement	Propulsion	Laid down	Launched	Commissioned	Fate
Kirov (Russian: Киров)	Admiral Ushakov (Russian: Адмирал Ушаков)	Shipyard No. 189, Leningrad	20 × SS-N-19 Shipwreck (Note: The SS-N-19 missile is intended to be replaced by a mix of SS-N-26 Strobile, SS-N-27 Sizzler and SS-N-33 missiles in Admiral Nakhimov and Pytor Velikiy)	2 × AK-100 100 mm (3.9 in)	28,000 t (27,558 long tons)	2 shaft CONAS; 2 × nuclear reactors and 2 × steam turbines, 32 kn (59 km/h; 37 mph)	27 March 1974	26 December 1977	30 December 1980	Laid up
Frunze (Russian: Фрунзе)	Admiral Lazarev (Russian: Адмирал Лазарев)	Shipyard No. 189, Leningrad	20 × SS-N-19 Shipwreck	1 × twin AK-130 130 mm (5.1 in)	28,000 t (27,558 long tons)	2 shaft CONAS; 2 × nuclear reactors and 2 × steam turbines, 32 kn (59 km/h; 37 mph)	27 July 1978	26 May 1981	31 October 1984	Sold for scrapping, February 2021
Kalinin (Russian: Калинин)	Admiral Nakhimov (Russian: Адмирал Нахимов)	Shipyard No. 189, Leningrad	20 × SS-N-19 Shipwreck	1 × twin AK-130 130 mm (5.1 in)	28,000 t (27,558 long tons)	2 shaft CONAS; 2 × nuclear reactors and 2 × steam turbines, 32 kn (59 km/h; 37 mph)	17 May 1983	25 April 1986	30 December 1988	Sea trials
Yuri Andropov (Russian: Юрий Андропов)	Pyotr Velikiy (Russian: Пётр Великий)	Shipyard No. 189, Leningrad	20 × SS-N-19 Shipwreck	1 × twin AK-130 130 mm (5.1 in)	28,000 t (27,558 long tons)	2 shaft CONAS; 2 × nuclear reactors and 2 × steam turbines, 32 kn (59 km/h; 37 mph)	11 March 1986	29 April 1989	9 April 1998	In service
Kuznetsov (Russian: Кузнецо́в)		Shipyard No. 189, Leningrad	20 × SS-N-19 Shipwreck	1 × twin AK-130 130 mm (5.1 in)	28,000 t (27,558 long tons)	2 shaft CONAS; 2 × nuclear reactors and 2 × steam turbines, 32 kn (59 km/h; 37 mph)	Mid-1989	—N/a		Cancelled, 4 October 1990; Scrapped in place
