= North Korean destroyer Kang Kon =

North Korean Navy destroyer

History

North Korea
- Name: Kang Kon; (강건)
- Namesake: Kang Kon
- Builder: Hambuk Shipyard, Chongjin
- Laid down: May 2024
- Launched: 12 June 2025
- Commissioned: 6 September 2026
- Identification: Hull number: 52
- Status: Active

General characteristics
- Type: Choe Hyon-class destroyer
- Displacement: 5,000 t (4,900 long tons)
- Length: ~140–145 m (459 ft 4 in – 475 ft 9 in)
- Beam: ~16 m (52 ft 6 in)
- Sensors & processing systems: Phased array radars
- Electronic warfare & decoys: 4 × countermeasures dispensers
- Armament: 1 × ~127 mm (5 in)-type naval gun; 1 × Pantsir-ME CIWS; 2 × 30 mm AK-630 CIWS; 74 × VLS cells of various sizes for guided missiles; Anti-ship cruise missile launchers; 4 × 4 small launchers
- Aircraft carried: 1 × helicopter
- Aviation facilities: Flight deck

Kang Kon (Korean: 강건) is the second ship of Choe Hyon-class destroyers to be operated by the Korean People's Navy. The ship is among the first destroyers operated by the North Korean navy.

== Design and description ==
According to the press release by the North Korean state-run news agency Korean Central News Agency, the class is classified as a multipurpose destroyer with a 5,000-tonne (4,900-long-ton) displacement. Based on satellite imagery analysis, the destroyer has a length of around 140 to 145 metres (459 ft 4 in to 475 ft 9 in) and beam of around 16 metres (52 ft 6 in).

Based on footage released by the North Korean state media during the first ship's construction in December 2024 and satellite imagery of the second ship, the vessels would be armed with one main gun and numerous vertical launching system (VLS) cells for guided missiles, located at the bow, just behind the main gun, and at the stern. The ship would also feature fixed-panel phased array radars integrated into the superstructures.

Based on the photos of Choe Hyon during its launch ceremony, the ship is armed with a main gun of ~127-millimetre (5.0 in) type, a Pantsir-ME and two 30 mm (1.2 in) AK-630 close-in weapon systems (CIWS), and 74 VLS cells of various sizes for guided missiles. The ship's VLS cells consist of 32 small cells, 12 medium-sized cells, 20 large cells and 10 very large cells. The larger cells likely accommodate cruise missiles and ballistic missiles. The destroyer also has four turreted four-cell launchers, capable of firing short-range guided missiles, anti-submarine charges, or loitering munitions. An enclosure for what appears to be anti-ship cruise missile launchers is located amidship.

Kang Kon's countermeasure systems consists of four countermeasures dispensers, with two on each side of the ship located at the edge of the superstructure. The vessel is equipped with four phased array radars located above the bridge, with other various sensors and communication systems located on the main mast. The ship has a flight deck at stern for helicopter.

Citing Kim Jong Un's speech during the launch ceremony of Choe Hyon, the ship is claimed to have "anti-aircraft, anti-ship, anti-submarine and anti-ballistic missile capabilities", and also able to carry nuclear-armed strategic cruise missiles and tactical ballistic missiles.

== Construction and launch ==
Construction of the second ship of the class may have started in May 2024, with the erection of rows of pillars on both sides of a slipway at Hambuk Shipyard, Chongjin, on the country's east coast. Over the next few months, protective screen walls with a mesh netting rooftop were added to the slipway. The structure was likely built to cover the ship during its construction.

On 12 June 2025, the ship was officially launched, and was named Kang Kon (강건), after the first Chief of the General Staff of the Korean People's Army who was killed in action during the Korean War, and was given the hull number 52. Kim Jong Un and his daughter Kim Ju Ae attended. As of March 2026, Kang Kon was reported to have been berthed at Chongjin Port for an extended period, and appeared incapable of maneuvering by itself. However, three months later, North Korean state media reported that the navigation test of Kang Kon occurred on 4 June.

On 5 July 2026, North Korean state media reported that Kim Jong Un observed a test of the ship's nuclear-capable cruise missile and other weapons from the shore; Kim also ordered the Kang Kon's trials to be completed and the ship put in active service within two months. The ship returned to Rajin Port on 16 July 2026.

On 7 September 2026, North Korea announced that the commission ceremony of Kang Kon took place on 6 September at Wonsan Port. Kim Jong Un attended the event with his daughter Kim Ju Ae and wife, Ri Sol-ju.

=== Launch accident ===
On 21 May 2025, the first attempt of launching the ship took place at Chongjin, however, a "serious accident" occurred, damaging the hull in the process. The vessel overturned after its stern suddenly slipped into the water while the bow remained on shore, causing extensive hull damage and possibly compromising internal equipment. Kim Jong Un declared this to be a "criminal act" and that it had "lowered the dignity and self-respect of our state in a moment". He stated that the ship must be restored by the next plenary of the party in June. He also called for those designing the ship to be held responsible. Satellite imagery taken on 2 June showed that the ship had been restored to an upright position. The ship was successfully launched on 5 June and it was reported that it was sent to Rajin Dockyard. The warship docked at the drydock in Rajin on 8 June.

The incident happened during the public unveiling of the new warship. According to satellite imagery and KCNA reports, the destroyer tilted sharply to one side after sustaining damage to its underside. Images also showed the vessel partially covered with a blue tarpaulin and a portion of it resting on land.

While there were no confirmed reports of casualties or injuries, initial reports had suggested that the hull was punctured. However, KCNA later contradicted this, stating, "There was no hole in the bottom of the ship, though the right side was scraped and some sea water entered the rear." Overall, the ship's damage was assessed as "not serious".

Following repairs and refloating, the vessel was announced to have been launched on 5 June 2025. A week later, after further repairs, a launching ceremony for the vessel was held on 12 June at Rajin Port, with Kim Jong Un in attendance according to KCNA.

==== Aftermath ====
On 23 May, North Korea launched a full-scale investigation into the accident. Afterward, the shipyard's manager, Hong Kil-ho, was summoned by law enforcement for questioning. Kim Jong Un described the incident as a "criminal act" and condemned it as a consequence of "extreme carelessness, irresponsibility, and unscientific practices". He announced that disciplinary measures would be addressed at the upcoming plenary session of the ruling party. Law enforcement also arrested the chief engineer, the construction head and an administrative manager. Ri Hyong-son, a deputy at the WPK Munitions Industry Department, was also detained and deemed to be "largely responsible for the serious accident" according to North Korea's state news agency, KCNA. KCNA reported that these individuals were deemed "responsible" for the incident.

== See also ==
- Najin-class frigate
