= Kang Kon =

Korean military leader (1918–1950)

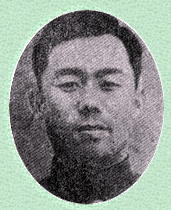

Chief of the General Staff
- In office February 1948 – September 1950
- Leader: Kim Il Sung
- Preceded by: Position established
- Succeeded by: Nam Il

Personal details
- Born: 23 June 1918 Sangju, Keishōhoku Province, Korea, Empire of Japan
- Died: 8 September 1950 (aged 32) Near Kŭm River, Korean Peninsula
- Citizenship: North Korean

Military service
- Allegiance: Korean People's Army
- Years of service: 1945–1950
- Commands: Chief of the General Staff (Note: Considered equivalent to Lieutenant General)
- Battles/wars: Korean independence movement: Pacification of Manchukuo; Chinese Civil War; World War II: Pacific War; Korean War: Operation Pokpung †

Kang Kon (Korean: 강건; Hanja: 姜健; born Kang Shin-tae; 23 June 1918 – 8 September 1950) was a Korean military leader active in Manchuria and the Korean Peninsula as well as a politician during the years leading up to the Korean War and during the first stages of the war in 1950. Kang led the North Korean Army offensive during the opening stages of the war as Chief of Staff until he was killed by a land mine on September 8, 1950.

== Early life ==
Kang was born in Sangju, Keishōhoku Province, Korea, Empire of Japan (now North Gyeongsang Province, South Korea), on 23 June 1918, and at the young age of 16 began his involvement in national liberation and military ventures. He moved to Jilin Province in Manchuria as a child and grew up there. As a teenager, he was actively involved in recruiting anti-Japanese guerrillas for his long-time friend, Kim Il Sung, and is remembered as being unusually tall and often towering over others. Before his leadership roles in the Korean War, Kang joined the anti-Japanese struggle in Manchuria in 1932, and later fled into Soviet territory in the early 1940s, where, by the end of World War II he was an officer in the 88th Independent Brigade in the Red Army, consisting of both Korean and Chinese soldiers.

== Pre-Korean War ==
Like many of the others who served in high ranking positions under Kim Il Sung, Kang had served with Kim in Manchuria fighting against the Japanese. While in Manchuria he organized and commanded the Jilin Peace Preservation Army. Even though Kang (and other Koreans fighting in Manchuria) had better military credentials than Kim, Kim was encouraged to take the reins of the new communist country because of his ability to cultivate the Russians.

In the summer of 1946, Kang returned from Soviet Russia to North Korea to help establish the Korean People's Army and by 1948 he was appointed the Chief of the General Staff Department, and was an important figure in the planning of the South Korean invasion with the help of Russian war strategists and was selected to lead the invasion. According to the CIA, as of late 1947, Kang commanded a force of approximately 21,000 troops, composed of units such as the 17th Column, the 5th and 6th Independent Divisions and the 1st and 2nd Peace Preservation Brigades in Yanji. He was a member of the Central Committee of the Workers' Party of Korea and a member of the Supreme People's Assembly.

Kang was known as a ruthless soldier, as was reflected in the armies he commanded; they were aggressive, insensitive to risk, and eager for a victory by August 15, as Kim Il Sung demanded.

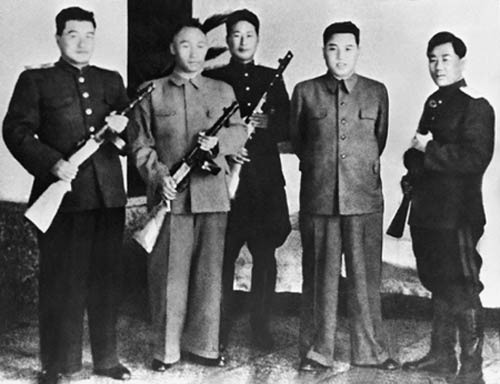
Choe Yong-gon, Kim Chaek, Kim Il, and Kang Kon receiving the first domestically produced Type 49 submachine guns from President Kim Il Sung, 1949.

== Korean War ==
Kang Kon spearheaded the North Korean People's Army operations southeast towards Pusan. His military endeavors were successful and had pushed the South Korean and UN forces down to the Pusan Perimeter, and on the morning of 4 August 1950, the North Korean's were ready to strike their final blow, and capture the last UN controlled area on the Peninsula. On August 4, the morning that began the Battle of Pusan Perimeter, Kang was injured when his makeshift command post (an abandoned meat-packaging plant, selected for its thick concrete walls, originally constructed for refrigeration) was struck by a 500-pound bomb. The blast killed three people and wounded eight, one of whom was Kang. He had been in the radio room checking messages at the time of the explosion and suffered a head injury and a broken forearm.

=== Death ===
On 8 September 1950, Kang's car ran over a land mine near the Kŭm River in the southern part of Korea, killing him. He was awarded "Hero of the Republic" and two days after his death, Kim Il Sung held a funeral for his fallen, long-time comrade in Pyongyang.

== Legacy ==
In 1968 Kim Il Sung built a statue for Kang, and there is a North Korean military school named after him, Kang Kon Military Academy.

The second Choe Hyon-class destroyer, launched on 12 June 2025, was named Kang Kon in his honor.

== Notes ==
Military offices
| Preceded by Position created | Chief of the General Staff of the Korean People's Army; September 1948– 8 September 1950 | Succeeded by Nam Il |
