= North Korean destroyer Choe Hyon =

North Korean Navy destroyer

History

North Korea
- Name: Choe Hyon; (최현)
- Namesake: Choe Hyon
- Builder: Nampo Shipyard, (Note: Also known as Nampho Dockyard or Nampho Port.) Nampo
- Laid down: May 2024
- Launched: 27 April 2025
- Commissioned: 23 June 2026
- Identification: Hull number 51
- Status: Active

General characteristics
- Class & type: Choe Hyon-class destroyer
- Displacement: 5,000 t (4,900 long tons)
- Length: ~140–145 metres (459 ft 4 in – 475 ft 9 in)
- Beam: ~16 m (52 ft 6 in)
- Sensors & processing systems: Phased array radars; Type 362 air/surface search radar; 3 × fire-control radars; 2 × navigation radars; Hull-mounted sonar; IFF system
- Electronic warfare & decoys: 4 × countermeasures dispensers; R-ESM; R-ECM
- Armament: 1 × 127 mm (5.0 in) or 130 mm (5.1 in) naval gun; 1 × Pantsir-ME CIWS; 2 × 30 mm CIWS; 88 × VLS cells of various sizes for guided missiles; 4 × 4 anti-ship missile launchers; 2 × 2 533 mm (21.0 in) DTA-53 torpedo launchers
- Aircraft carried: 1 × helicopter or UAV
- Aviation facilities: Flight deck

Choe Hyon (Korean: 최현) is the lead ship of the Choe Hyon-class destroyers to be operated by the Korean People's Navy (KPN). The ship is the first destroyer operated by the KPN. The vessel was launched on 27 April 2025 and entered service on 23 June 2026.

== Design and development ==
According to the press release by the North Korean state-run news agency Korean Central News Agency, the class is classified as a multipurpose destroyer with a displacement of 5,000 tonnes (4,900 long tons). Based on satellite imagery analysis, the destroyer has a length of around 140 to 145 metres (459 ft 4 in to 475 ft 9 in) and beam of around 16 metres (52 ft 6 in).

Based on footage released by the North Korean state media during the first ship construction in December 2024 and satellite imagery of a second then-unnamed ship of the same class, the vessels would be armed with one main gun and numerous vertical launching system (VLS) cells for guided missiles, located at the bow, just behind the main gun, and at the stern. The VLS cells bear a resemblance to the 3M22 Zircon. The ship would also feature fixed-panel phased array radars integrated into the superstructures. They are reportedly similar to those found on the Russian Karakurt-class corvettes.

Based on the photos of Choe Hyon during the launching ceremony, the ship is armed with a 127-or-130-millimetre (5.0 or 5.1 in) main gun, with its design bearing a resemblance to the OTO Melara design, a Pantsir-ME and two 30 mm (1.2 in) AK-630 close-in weapon system (CIWS), and 74 VLS cells of various sizes for guided missiles, with 44 cells located at the bow and 30 cells at stern. The ship VLS cells consisted of 32 small cells, 12 medium-sized cells, 20 large cells and 10 very large cells. The larger cells likely could accommodate cruise missiles and ballistic missiles. Following modifications and trials, Choe Hyon now has 88 VLS cells, as of the commissioning date. The destroyer also has what looks like four turreted four-cell Bulsae-4 launchers, which could be capable of firing short-range guided missiles, anti-submarine charges, or loitering munitions. An enclosure for what appears to be two quadruple anti-ship cruise missile launchers is located amidship. The ship has two 533-millimetre (21.0 in) DTA-53 twin-tube torpedo launchers on both sides.

There was also an exhibition of the weapon systems carried by Choe Hyon held after the launch ceremony. Notably, the exhibition displayed a Hwasong-11-series ballistic missile, as well as Kumsong-3 and Hwasal-2 cruise missiles. The ballistic missile model is apparently similar to Hwasong-11S.

Images of the Choe Hyon destroyer
- At launch
- Test of a weapon system

Choe Hyon's countermeasure systems consisted of four countermeasures dispensers, with two on each sides of the ship located at the edge of the superstructure. The vessel is equipped with four phased array radars located above the bridge, with other various sensors and communication systems, such as radar electronic support measures (R-ESM), radar electronic countermeasures (R-ECM), identification friend or foe (IFF) gear, two navigational radars, and possibly Type 362 air/surface search radar located on the main mast. Two fire-control radars is located above the bridge, with another one located on the rear mast. Additional R-ESM and R-ECM arrays is located around the smokestack. The ship also has a hull-mounted sonar (HMS) on the bow. The ship has a flight deck at the stern to accommodate helicopter and/or unmanned aerial vehicle (UAV) operations, but it has no hangar to potentially house it. Lee Illwoo, who is from the Korea Defense Network, stated that the ship's anti-air radar and weapon systems and engine are likely acquired from Russia based on analyzing the photos released. The South Korean Joint Chiefs of Staff stated a thorough analysis is being carried out to examine the ship's system as they also believe Russia provided assistance to the North Koreans.

In a speech given during Choe Hyon's launching ceremony, Kim Jong Un claimed that the ship would have "anti-aircraft, anti-ship, anti-submarine and anti-ballistic missile capabilities", and also able to carry nuclear-armed strategic cruise missiles and tactical ballistic missiles. He remarked that the ship will build up North Korea's maritime sovereignty and manage all military threats, including nuclear-based threats and naval blockades. He also pledged to have more Choe Hyon-class destroyers built over time and build a large-scale cruiser and nuclear-powered submarine.

Yang Moo-jin, president of the University of North Korean Studies, said that the launch of Choe Hyon highlights North Korea's desire to give the KPN so-called "blue water" capabilities away from North Korea's coastline. According to Lim Eul-chul, a professor at Kyungnam University's Institute for Far Eastern Studies (IFES), the launching of Choe Hyon would help build national unity despite ongoing economic difficulties. In addition, he also stated that the possibility of it carrying nuclear armaments would put psychological and strategic pressure on Japan, South Korea, and the US.

== Construction ==
In May 2024, defense analysts noted that North Korea had constructed rows of pillars on both sides of a slipway in Nampo Shipyard, located on the country's west coast. Over the next few months, protective screen walls measuring 170 metres (560 ft) long and 30 metres (98 ft) wide, with mesh netting rooftop were added to the slipway. The structure was likely built to cover the ship during its construction. A block of the ship's hull on the slipway was spotted via satellite imagery on 27 May. The mesh netting was replaced with proper roofing in October 2024.

The first photos of the destroyers were taken during Kim Jong Un's visit to Nampo Shipyard in September and October 2024. The photos were first publicly shown in an arms expo held in Pyongyang in November 2024. More photos in high quality were shown by the state media Korean Central Television (KCTV) on 29 December 2024. Joseph Dempsey, a research associate for Defence and Military Analysis at the International Institute for Strategic Studies (IISS), said that the ship's construction is the largest vessel ever constructed in North Korea.

On 9 April 2025, the Stimson Center's 38 North publication reported that the ship's construction was mostly completed and that it had been shifted from the construction hall into a floating drydock. According to a later press release by Korean Central News Agency, citing elite Party member Jo Chun-ryong, Choe Hyon was built in roughly 400 days without relying on foreign assistance.

== Launch, trials and deployment ==
A launching ceremony for the first ship was held on 25 April 2025 at Nampo harbor, coinciding with the 93rd founding anniversary of the Korean People's Army. The event was attended by Kim Jong Un with Admiral Kim Myong-sik, Commander-in-Chief of the KPN, and senior leaders in the West and East fleets. Kim's daughter, Kim Ju Ae, was seen attending the ceremony after she came to Nampo with her father by train. Kim Yo Jong, Kim's sister, was reportedly seen attending the ceremony with two children who are reportedly her own.

The ship was named Choe Hyon (최현), after the anti-Japanese guerilla fighter and later top official Choe Hyon, his son is the North Korean politician and military officer Choe Ryong-hae. Kim Jong Un's speech during the event stated that the ship would undergo several performance and operation tests before entering service in 2026.

No Kwang-chol, the North Korean Defense Minister, cut the ropes that launched Choe Hyon.

On 30 April 2025, the KCNA reported that Choe Hyon conducted a series of tests with its weapon systems with cruise missiles, anti-aircraft missiles, and the 127 mm main gun being fired on 28 April. The KCNA reported on 29 April that additional tests were conducted on other ship-based automatic guns, smoke and electronic jamming guns. Kim observed the tests alongside officials from Missile Administration, the Academy of Defence Sciences, the Detection and Electronic Warfare Administration and the Nampo Shipyard.

According to the Center for Strategic and International Studies, Choe Hyon will likely operate out of Pipagot (Note: Also known as Pip'a-got.) Navy Base on North Korea's west coast. However, Kim Jong Un has stated that the ship will be a part of the country's East Sea Fleet, which would necessitate a rare North Korean voyage around the Korean Peninsula.

Between 3 March and 12 April 2026, Choe Hyon conducted firing tests of missiles, all were under Kim Jong Un supervision. The first one, occurred between 3 and 4 March, involved "strategic" cruise missiles. The second one occurred on 10 March, when Choe Hyon fired additional cruise missiles during another test. An additional test occurred on 12 April 2026. In this test, alongside "strategic" cruise missiles, Choe Hyon also fired three anti-ship cruise missiles. Three days after the April test, Choe Hyon was registered with the International Maritime Organization.

On 7 May 2026, Kim Jong Un and several leading officials who were members of the shipbuilding and defense sector boarded the Choe Hyon, assessed the ship's military readiness, and conducted a maneuvering test in the Yellow Sea over 120 nautical miles. He also claimed the Choe Hyon would be operational and deployed mid-June.

At the end of May 2026, satellite imagery captured the destroyer sailing and possibly, testing weapons, in the area of Nampo Dam. On 23 June 2026, North Korea held a commission ceremony for Choe Hyon, with Kim Jong Un in attendance. While state media said that the ship "departed" the port, a week later, satellite photography showed it was still seen berthed at Nampho port.

== See also ==
- Najin-class frigate
