= Hermes (missile) =

Russian multi-role guided missile

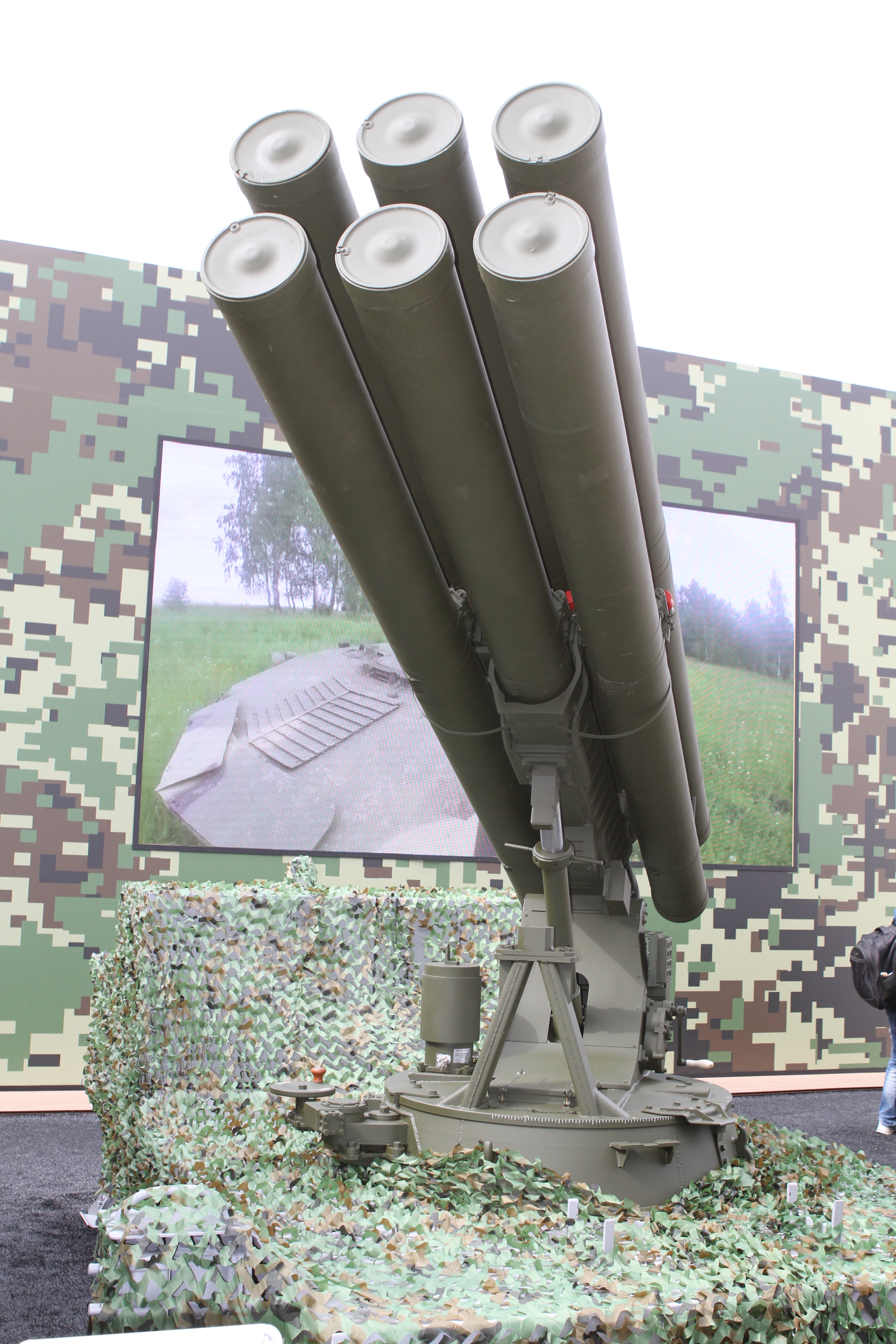
- Type: Air-to-surface; Surface-to-surface; Land-attack; Anti-tank guided missile Surface-to-air
- Place of origin: Russia

Production history
- Manufacturer: KBP Instrument Design Bureau

Specifications
- Mass: 110 kg (missile + container, 170 mm booster stage); 130 kg (missile + container, 210 mm booster stage)
- Length: 3500 mm (container)
- Diameter: booster stage, 170/210 mm; sustainer stage, 130 mm
- Engine: Solid-fuel rocket
- Operational range: 15-20 km (170 mm booster stage); 100 km (210 mm booster stage)
- Maximum speed: 1000 m/s (170 mm booster stage); 1300 m/s (210 mm booster stage)
- Guidance system: target area: radio-command guidance, terminal path: semi-active laser guidance
- Launch platform: Rotary and fixed-wing platforms, ships, and ground vehicles

Hermes (Russian: Гермес) is a family of modularly designed guided missiles developed in Russia by the KBP Instrument Design Bureau.

The Hermes missile can be used from air, ground or naval launchers.

== Development ==
Development of the Hermes by the KBP Instrument Design Bureau started in the 1990s. The missile bears a striking resemblance to the 57E6 used by the Pantsir missile system, and it is probably a derivative of this model. The Hermes-A variant was trialed in 2003. The series production of the Hermes was meant to start in 2011-2012, but this did not happen, as the development process was stopped for several years. In 2016, it was announced that the Hermes missile would be tested in live conditions in Syria. However, nothing indicates that this actually happened. But in the late 2010s, a series of announcements signaled a renewed interest in the missile, following experience from the Russian military intervention in the Syrian civil war showing the need for more high-precision armaments.

== Description ==
The Hermes system features a multistage rocket missile with a high-powered booster. Two booster diameters are available, 170 and 210 mm. It uses inertial and/or radio-command guidance for the cruise phase, and semi-active laser guidance for the terminal phase. Radar and infrared homing are also talked about. The Hermes is designed to engage a great variety of targets, including armoured vehicles, fortifications of various types, small naval surface targets, artillery positions, slow-flying air targets, and others. It can be fired single or in volleys at ranges of up to 100 km and can track and destroy over-the-horizon targets.

== Characteristics ==
- Warhead: 27.5 kg
- Explosive: 13 kg
- Guidance: Inertial and/or radio-command guidance (cruise phase), semi-active laser homing (terminal). Possible infrared and radar homing

== Variants ==
- Hermes-A: Air-launched version. To be used by the Kamov Ka-52 (up to 16 launchers) and possibly the Sukhoi Su-25. Range between 15 and 20 km.
- Hermes-K: Naval version. Two types of supports are available: a simpler support with four launchers for lighter naval units, and a modified version of the AK-306 CIWS with four launchers for heavier vessels. The Hermes-K's range can be increased up to 100 km with the use of the 210 mm booster.
- Hermes-S: Land vehicle version. Uses a Kamaz truck chassis, transporting up to 24 missiles. Versions with and without a guidance system for the missiles have been shown in designer drawings. Moreover, a fire-control vehicle with a mast-mounted radar or opto-electronic detection system has also been shown. A coastal defence version is also possible. The Hermes-S's range can be increased to 100 km with the use of the 210 mm booster.

== See also ==
- Nimrod – (Israel)
- 9M337 Sosna-R – (Russia)
- Pantsir missile system – (Russia)
- HJ-10 – (China)
- AGM-114 – (United States)
- Pantsir-M – (Russia)
