= Pantsir-M =

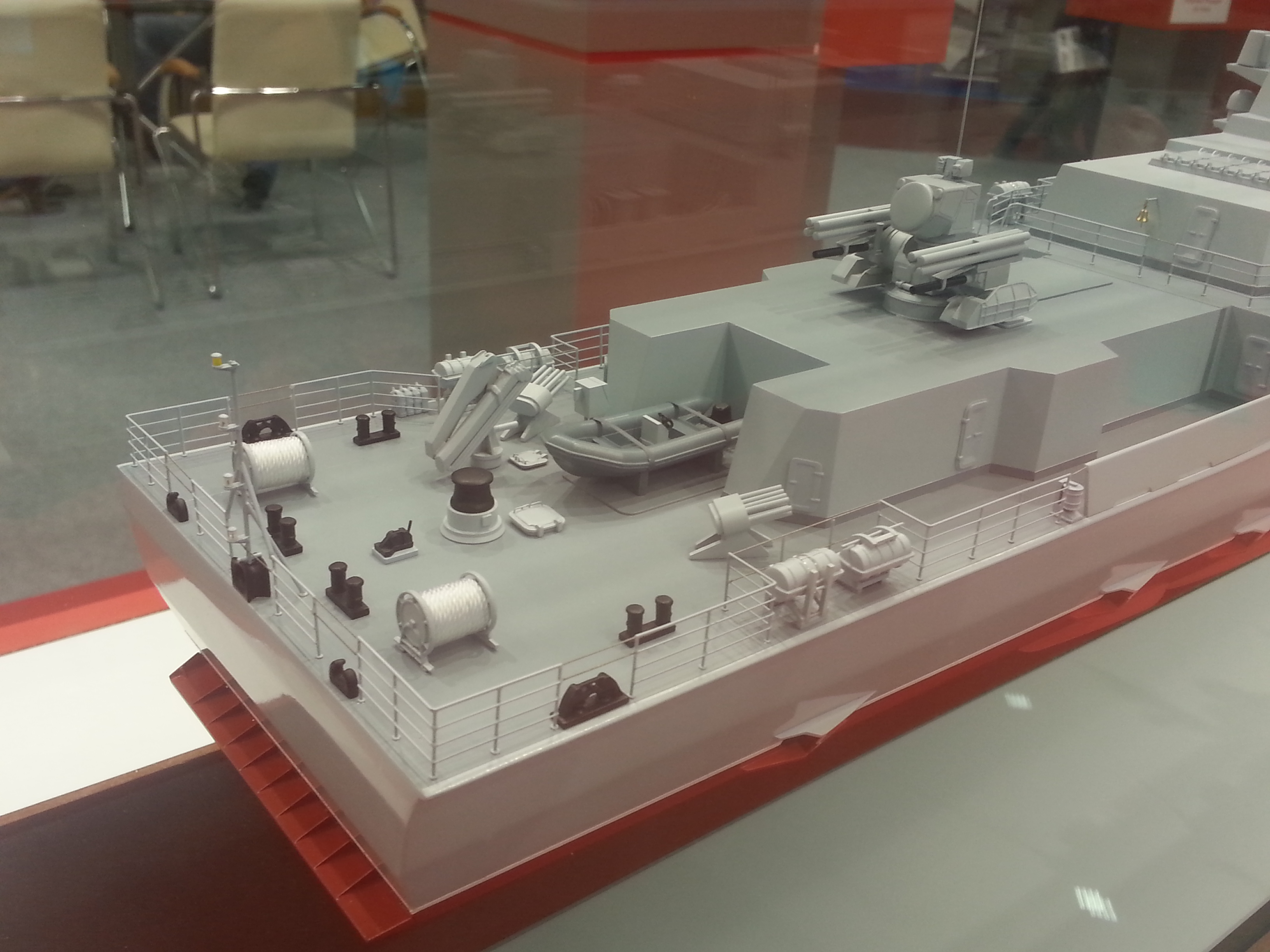
- Model of a corvette of project 22800 at the «Army 2016»
- Type: Hybrid SAM-Gun based CIWS
- Place of origin: Russian Federation

Service history
- In service: 2018–present
- Used by: Russian Federation
- Wars: Russian invasion of Ukraine

Production history
- Designer: KBP
- Designed: 2015
- Manufacturer: KBP
- Unit cost: Unknown
- Produced: 2015-present
- No. built: Unknown
- Variants: Pantsir-ME

Specifications
- Rate of fire: 10,000 rounds/minute
- Maximum firing range: 20 km
- Main armament: Hermes-K missiles and 57E6 missiles
- Secondary armament: Two 30×165mm AO-18KD
- Launch platform: Ship

Pantsir-M (Russian: Панцирь-М, lit. 'Carapace-M') is a Russian jamming-resistant naval close-in weapon system (CIWS) which entered service in 2018. Pantsir-M will replace Kashtan-M systems in Russian Navy.

According to Rostec CEO Sergey Chemezov, Pantsir-M's destructive power is three to four times higher than Kashtan-M's.

== Description ==
Pantsir-M is equipped with friend or foe identification system and armed with naval version of the Pantsir's 57E6 missiles and Hermes-K missiles. Its secondary armament are two six-barreled 30×165mm GSh-6-30K/AO-18KD rotary cannons (range 5 km), same as on Kashtan-M. Pantsir-M is fully automated and can engage up to four targets simultaneously at a range of up to 20 km and can operate as a battery of up to four modules. Pantsir-M can intercept sea skimming missiles flying as low as two meters above the surface. If a target isn't sufficiently destroyed by Pantsir's missile attack it can automatically direct its cannons against it. Pantsir-M's phased array radar, electro-optical/infrared targeting and identification system are based on that of Pantsir's 1RS2-1.

== Parameters ==
- Range: 20 km
- Altitude: 15 km
- Reaction time: 3–5 s
- Rate of fire: 10,000 rounds per minute

== Versions ==
There are two versions:

- Pantsir-M: The domestic version
- Pantsir-ME: The export version

== Users ==
- Russian Federation
  - Karakurt-class corvette – A class of small missile corvettes designed for the Russian Navy.
  - Kirov-class battlecruiser: Admiral Nakhimov – A nuclear-powered guided-missile cruiser currently undergoing modernization.
- North Korea
  - Choe Hyon-class destroyer – A newly launched class of guided-missile destroyers, with the lead ship named Choe Hyon.

== See also ==
- Pantsir-S1
- Meroka CIWS
