= Russian battlecruiser Admiral Nakhimov =

Kirov-class battlecruiser

Coordinates: 64.576317°N 39.816043°E

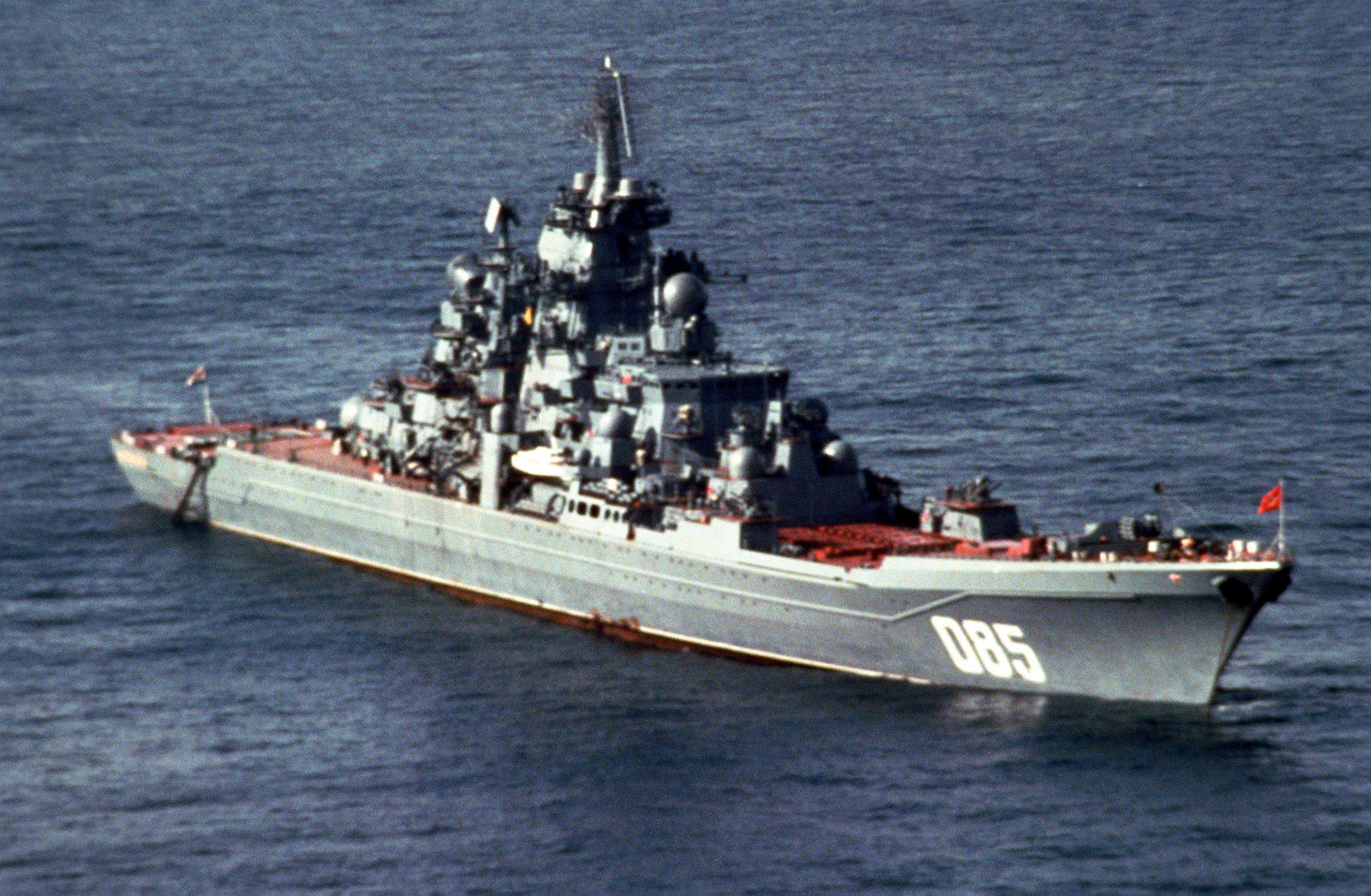
- Kalinin c. 1991 (appearance before modernization)

History

→ Soviet Union → Russia
- Name: Kalinin → Admiral Nakhimov
- Namesake: Mikhail Kalinin → Pavel Nakhimov
- Builder: Baltic Shipyard, Leningrad
- Laid down: 17 May 1983
- Launched: 25 April 1986
- Commissioned: 30 December 1988
- Identification: Pennant number: 180 → 064 → 085 → 080
- Status: Undergoing sea trials after refit and modernization

General characteristics
- Class & type: Kirov-class battlecruiser
- Displacement: 24,000 t (24,000 long tons) standard; 28,000 t (28,000 long tons) fully loaded
- Length: 251.1 m (823 ft 10 in)
- Beam: 28.5 m (93 ft 6 in)
- Draft: 10.3 m (33 ft 10 in)
- Installed power: 2 × nuclear reactors; 2 × boilers
- Propulsion: 2 × steam turbines; 2 × shafts
- Speed: 32 kn (59 km/h; 37 mph) (CONAS); 25 kn (46 km/h; 29 mph) (nuclear only)
- Range: Unlimited (nuclear only)
- Complement: 710 officers and sailors
- Armament: 80 × Kalibr, P-800 Oniks or Tsirkon anti-ship missile launchers; 96 × S-400 surface-to-air missile launchers; 2 × 4K33 Osa-M surface-to-air missile launchers; 6 × Pantsir-M close-in weapon systems; 1 × 130 mm (5 in) A-129M dual-purpose gun; 10 × 533 mm (21 in) torpedo tubes; 1 × RBU-6000 anti-submarine rocket launchers; 2 × RBU-1000 anti-submarine rocket launchers
- Aircraft carried: 3 × Kamov Ka-27M helicopters

Admiral Nakhimov (Russian: Адмирал Нахимов) is the third and modernized Project 1144 Orlan (NATO reporting name Kirov-class) battlecruiser of the Russian Navy. The ship was originally part of the Soviet Navy as Kalinin (Russian: Калинин), until it was renamed in 1992 after Pavel Nakhimov. Officially it is designated as a "heavy nuclear-powered missile cruiser", but due to being the largest surface warship in service besides aircraft carriers, the Kirov class is often called a "battlecruiser" (not to be confused for the battlecruisers of the 1910s). It was laid down on 17 May 1983 at the Baltic Shipyard in Leningrad, launched on 25 April 1986, and commissioned on 30 December 1988.

The Kirov-class battlecruisers were developed to counter NATO submarines and carrier strike groups. Admiral Nakhimov has a large armament that originally included P-700 Granit anti-ship missiles, S-300F surface-to-air missiles, 4K33 Osa-M surface-to-air missiles, and several anti-submarine missile launchers. It also has a helicopter landing pad and under-deck facilities to store three Kamov Ka-27 helicopters. To enable the ship to reach a high speed of over 30 knots, it is equipped with a combined nuclear and steam system, with each of its two steam turbines being connected to a nuclear reactor and an oil-fired boiler that provides additional power.

Since 1999 Admiral Nakhimov is undergoing a repair and a refit to receive new and improved weaponry and had been scheduled to re-enter service with the Russian Navy in around 2022. The date for the ship's return to service is uncertain. In 2021 it was reported that the ship's return to service would be delayed until "at least" 2023 while in February 2022 it was reported that Sevmash CEO Mikhail Budnichenko noted that the warship was planned for delivery in 2022. Later in the year it was again reported that the vessel's return to service might be delayed as late as 2024, with this being eventually confirmed by the head of United Shipbuilding Corporation Alexei Rakhmanov. In December 2024, TASS reported that the ship had begun factory sea trials after its repairs and modernization. The battlecruiser is assigned to Russia's Northern Fleet.

== Design ==
The Project 1144 Orlan (Russian: Орла́н, lit. 'sea eagle', NATO reporting name Kirov-class) nuclear-powered guided missile cruiser began to be developed in 1968 for the purpose of hunting enemy submarines. The Northern Design Bureau initially planned for it to be much smaller, displacing no more than 8,000–9,000 tons, but this was rejected by the commander-in-chief of the Soviet Navy, Admiral of the Fleet of the Soviet Union Sergey Gorshkov. In 1971 it was decided that it should include additional weapon systems, requiring a larger design. The Project 1144 cruiser intended primarily for anti-submarine warfare was merged with the Project 1165, which would have carried anti-ship missiles. To accommodate anti-submarine, anti-ship, and anti-air missiles, the Kirov class has a standard displacement of 24,000 t (24,000 long tons) and a displacement of 28,000 t (28,000 long tons) when fully loaded. This makes the Kirovs the largest surface warships to have been built since World War II besides aircraft carriers. Being larger than any Western cruiser, it is often described as a battlecruiser.

The battlecruiser has a top speed of 32 kn (59 km/h; 37 mph). For such a large ship to achieve that speed, the Kirov class is equipped with a combined nuclear and steam system (CONAS) that provides 140,000 horsepower (100,000 kW) to its two propeller shafts. Both of its two steam turbines are connected to a KN-3 nuclear reactor and an oil-fired boiler, the latter providing additional power for the vessel to be able to reach its maximum speed. The alternative, having four to six nuclear reactors, was rejected by the designers as being too big of a design risk. It has a virtually unlimited range at lower speeds, and a top speed of 25 kn (46 km/h; 29 mph), while on nuclear power, but its range at 32 knots is limited by fuel. The Kirovs have a length of 251.1 metres (823 ft 10 in), a beam of 59 metres (193 ft 7 in), and a draft of 10.3 metres (33 ft 10 in). The crew consists of 710. Officers and warrant officers have about 150 single or double cabins while the petty officers and enlisted sailors have 30 quarters for 8-30 people each.

The Kirov class was described by the U.S. intelligence community in the 1980s as having "an array of weapons that makes it one of the most powerfully armed surface warships in the world." The original armament of Admiral Nakhimov included 20 P-700 Granit anti-ship missile launchers, with one missile held in each; twelve S-300F surface-to-air missile launchers with 96 missiles in total, two 4K33 Osa-M batteries with a total of 40 surface-to-air missiles. In addition the battlecruiser had one twin 130 mm (5.1 in) AK-130 dual purpose gun, one RBU-6000 and two RBU-1000 anti-submarine missile launchers, and ten 533 mm (21.0 in) torpedo tubes. It also had six Kortik close-in weapons systems. It has a landing pad and an under-deck hangar to hold up to three helicopters. The battlecruiser is designed to counter NATO submarines and carrier strike groups.

== History ==
Kalinin was laid down on 17 May 1983 at Baltic Shipyard in Leningrad, launched on 25 April 1986, commissioned on 30 December 1988. It joined the Northern Fleet on 21 April 1989, though GlobalSecurity noted the cruiser was a Pacific fleet unit. On 4 January 1991 she went on long voyage to the Mediterranean Sea. After the end of the Cold War the cruiser was rarely deployed and the last time it went to sea on its own power was in July 1997. Admiral Nakhimov was towed from Murmansk to Severodvinsk on 14 August 1999 to undergo repairs. At that time it was manned by a reduced technical crew that was responsible for maintenance.

=== Reactivation ===
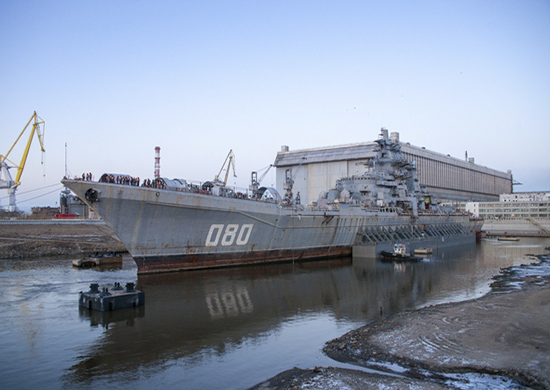
Admiral Nakhimov prior to modernization, 2014.

In 2006, a decision was made to modernize this ship instead of completing the construction of the submarine Belgorod. Later in 2006, she was undergoing refit at Sevmash shipyard in Severodvinsk, but was reported finished ahead of schedule and was announced to again be in service with the Northern Fleet. However, later reports state that the cruiser has been docked at Sevmash since 1999 without any activity. On 30 October 2008, Russian Navy representatives of the Northern Fleet announced that the first modification on Admiral Nakhimov had been started and that the ship would re-join the Russian fleet by 2012. In November 2010 the director of Sevmash, Nikolai Kalistratov, repeated this statement confirming that the Russian government had appropriated money for Admiral Nakhimov to be repaired in 2011 (costing over 50 billion rubles.) However he also said that the funds were insufficient and more were needed to bring the ship back to active service. After finishing repairs, Admiral Nakhimov was reported as likely to join the Russian Pacific Fleet. However, by 2020 it was reported that she would remain with the Northern Fleet.

In December 2011 the Sevmash shipyard stated that the refit of the ship would not be finished until after 2012. According to Sevmash General-Director Andrei Dyachkov the repairs were stopped because it was senseless to continue without having determined the final variant of modernization.

Work on modernizing Admiral Nakhimov was resumed in January 2014 with the vessel being projected to rejoin the Russian Navy in 2018. Admiral Nakhimov is slated to carry 60 Zircon hypersonic anti-ship cruise missiles, Kalibr cruise missiles and a navalized variant of the S-400 (missile) SAM system, among other weapons. According to Sevmash as of 2 November 2015 work on removing the battlecruiser's old equipment had been completed, and work to install its replacement was about to be commenced.

In 2018, Aleksey Rakhimov, the head of the United Shipbuilding Corporation, stated that the end date of the reconstruction remained 2021 or 2022, but additional changes made by the Ministry of Defense had made would require an amendment to the contract or a new contract. Trials are due to begin in 2020. In September 2019, state news agency TASS quoted Russian deputy defense minister Alexsey Krivoruchko that "It will be the most powerful navy warship. We inspected the project, the ship is now about 50% ready. As was agreed with Sevmash shipyard, we expect to receive the ship in late 2022." as reported by Jane's.

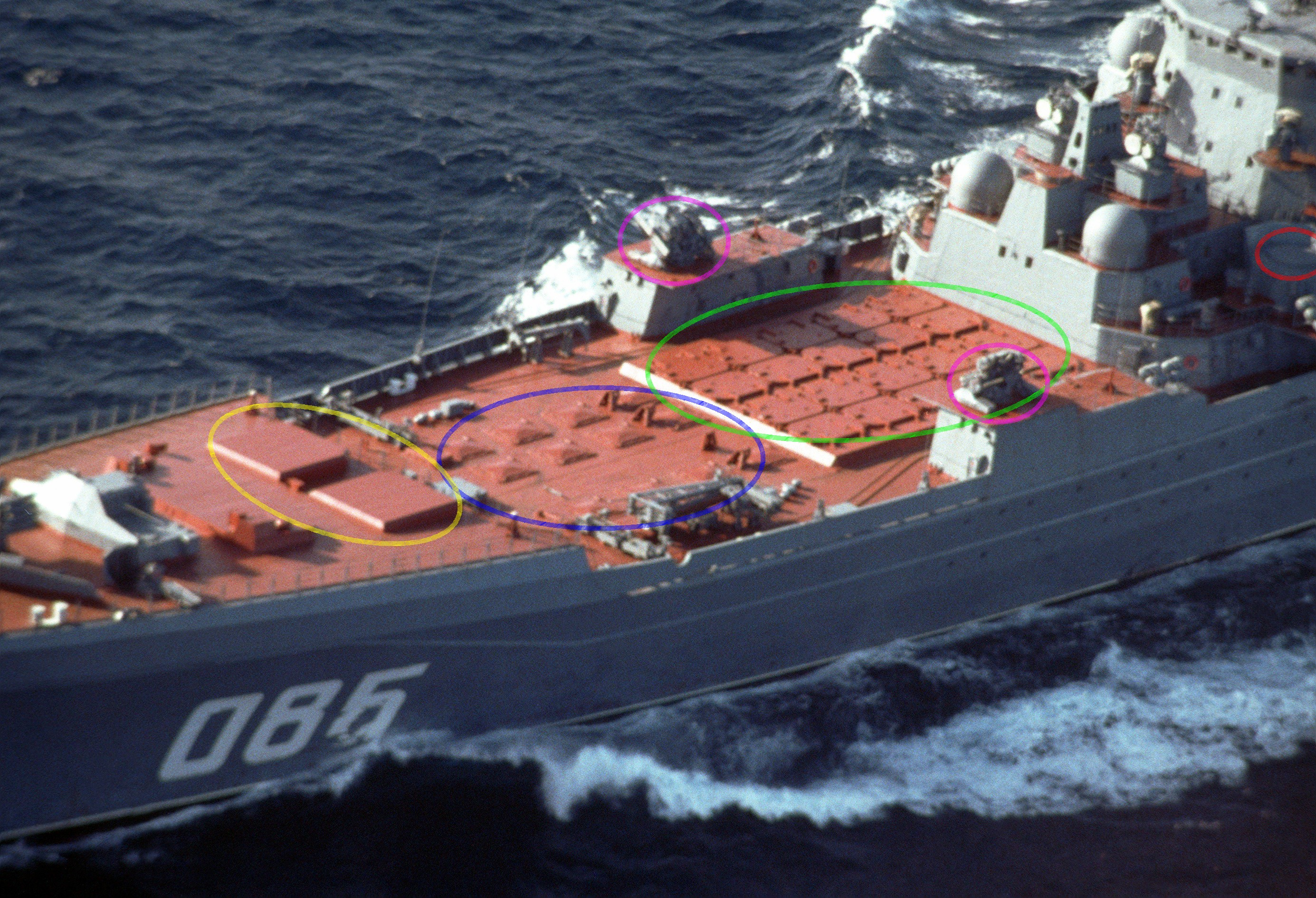
Aerial port view of the foredeck of Kalinin illustrating the differences from the lead ship of the class. 2 CADS-N-1 point defense gun/missile system 2 pop-up (lowered) SA-N-4 surface-to-air missile (SAM) launchers (one visible) 20 SS-N-19 cruise missile launchers 12 SA-N-6 surface-to-air missile (SAM) launchers place for 8 SA-N-9 surface-to-air missile (SAM) vertical launchers (not installed)

She was relaunched in August 2020 and was then expected to start sea trials in about 2023. It is expected to receive 176 VLS tubes: 80 for anti-surface and 96 for anti-air warfare. In early 2022, Sevmash CEO, Mikhail Budnichenko, noted that weapons systems for the cruiser would include: the Fort-M (NATO reporting name: SA-N-6 Grumble) and Pantsir-M air defense systems and Paket-NK and Otvet antisubmarine weapons. It was also reported that the cruiser would potentially be armed with up to 60 3M22 Zircon hypersonic anti-ship missiles.

In January 2023, it was reported that the loading of fuel and work on the power supply had begun, and that ship testing would begin later in the year. In February 2023, the head of United Shipbuilding Corporation Alexei Rakhmanov confirmed that testing of the ship would begin later in the year, and that the vessel is expected to return to service in 2024. On 30 May 2023, Sergei Shoigu announced that Admiral Nakhimov would begin sea trials before the end of 2023, with modernisation expected to be completed in 2024. On 13 June 2023, it was reported that the ship would begin sea trials in September 2023. However, on 21 June 2023, it was reported that Admiral Nakhimov would only begin sea trials in either December 2023 or May 2024, depending on how quickly modernisation work is completed. In late 2023, it was reported that sea trials would begin in Spring 2024. In June 2024, it was reported that factory sea trials would begin in the summer of 2025, and that Admiral Nakhimov would be delivered to the Russian Navy in 2026. In December 2024, TASS reported that the ship had begun factory sea trials. Its Reactor No. 1 was activated that month after being refueled, and Reactor No. 2 was activated in February 2025.

On 18 August 2025 it was claimed by a source in the shipbuilding industry that Admiral Nakhimov had started factory sea trials in the White Sea. Earlier that month, the head of the All-Russian Movement to Support the Navy said that the sea trials would begin in August. These claims were supported by video of the ship leaving harbour under tow.

On 1 June 2026, the Russian Ministry of Transport said that the ship had begun final sea trials. The ship returned to its home port of Severomorsk later that month.

As of 2026, the ship is reported to be equipped with the Ka-27M helicopter variant. The Ka-27M is an extensively modernised variant of the helicopter, replacing nearly all of the original mission systems with superior sensor integration and network-centric capabilities.
