= Ceremonial ship launching =

Ceremonial process of transferring a newly built vessel to the water

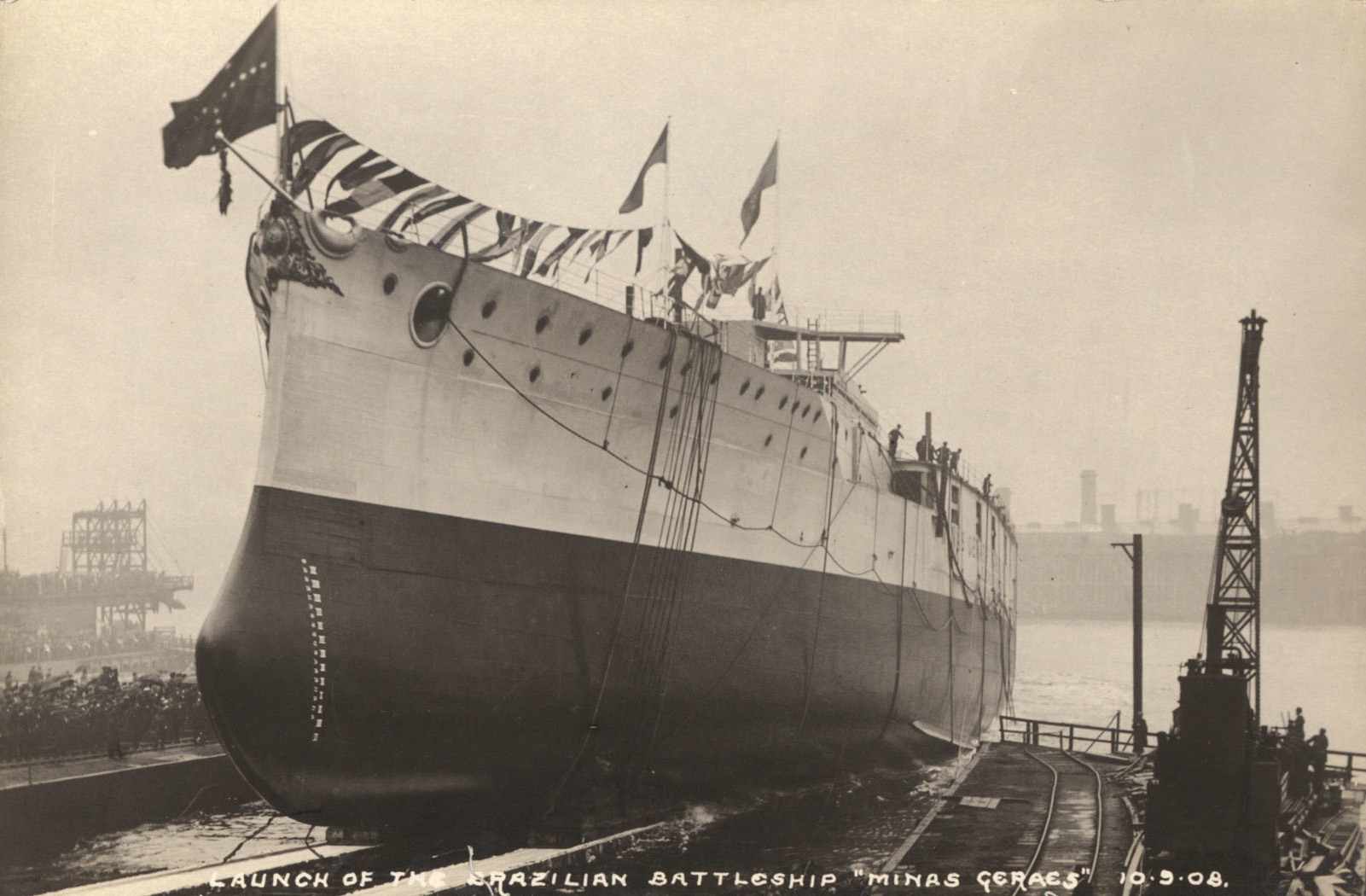
1908 launch of the Brazilian battleship Minas Geraes

The U.S. Navy's USS Billings is launched sideways into the Menominee River in Marinette, Wisconsin, 2017

Ceremonial ship launching involves the performing of ceremonies associated with the process of transferring a vessel to the water. It is a nautical tradition in many cultures, dating back millennia, to accompany the physical process with ceremonies which have been observed as public celebration and a solemn blessing, usually but not always, in association with the launch itself.

Ship launching imposes stresses on the ship not met during normal operation and in addition to the size and weight of the vessel represents a considerable engineering challenge as well as a public spectacle. The process also involves many traditions intended to invite good luck, such as christening by breaking a sacrificial bottle of champagne over the bow as the ship is named aloud and launched.

== Methods ==
There are three principal methods of conveying a new ship from building site to water, only two of which are called "launching". The oldest, most familiar, and most widely used is the end-on launch, in which the vessel slides down an inclined slipway, usually stern first. With the side launch, the ship enters the water broadside. This method came into use in the 19th century on inland waters, rivers, and lakes, and was more widely adopted during World War II. The third method is float-out, used for ships that are built in basins or dry docks and then floated by admitting water into the dock.

If launched in a restrictive waterway, drag chains are used to slow the ship speed to prevent it striking the opposite bank.

=== Stern-first ===
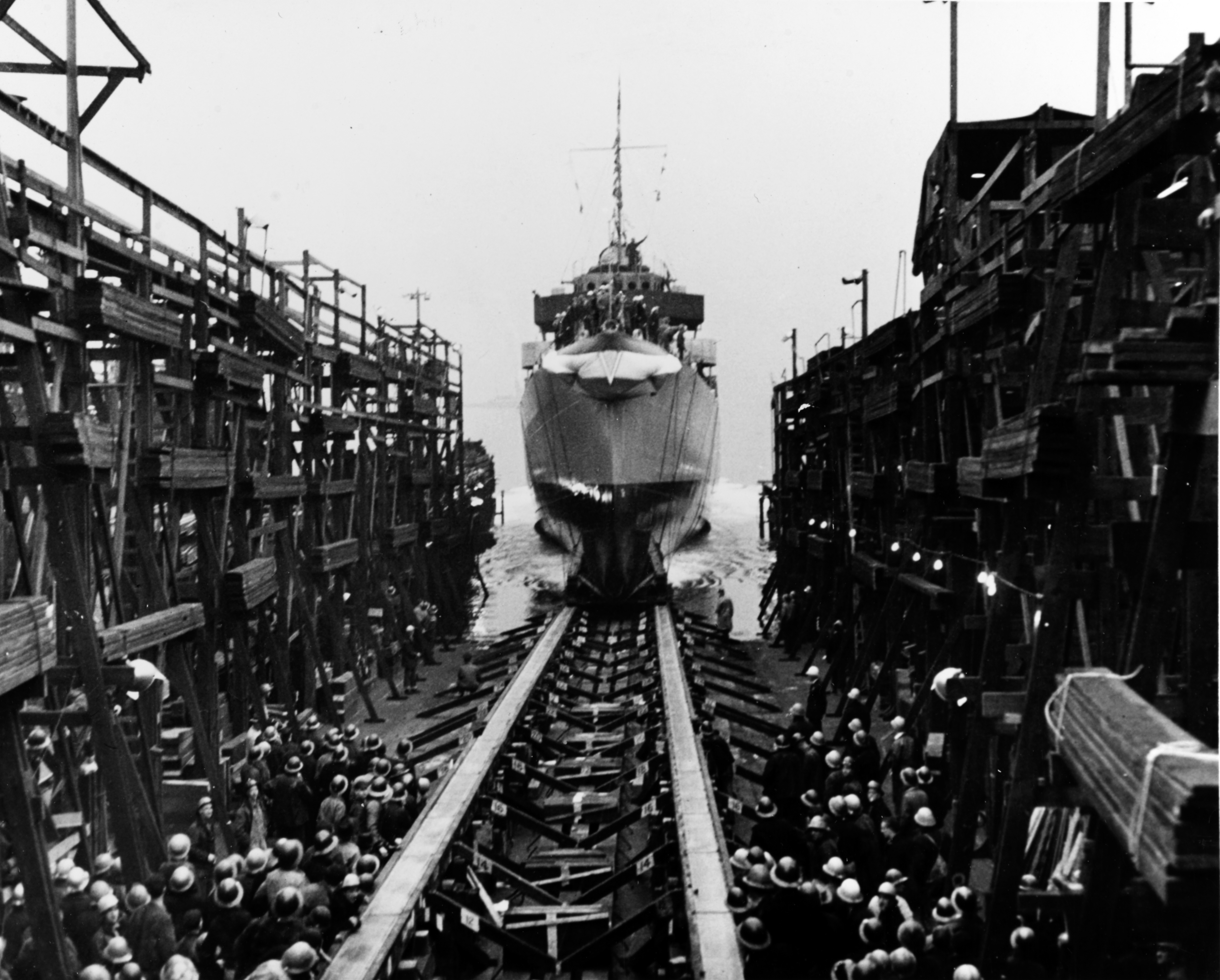
Destroyer USS Johnston (DD-557) slipping into the water stern-first during her launch from the Seattle-Tacoma Shipbuilding Corporation shipyard on 25 March 1943

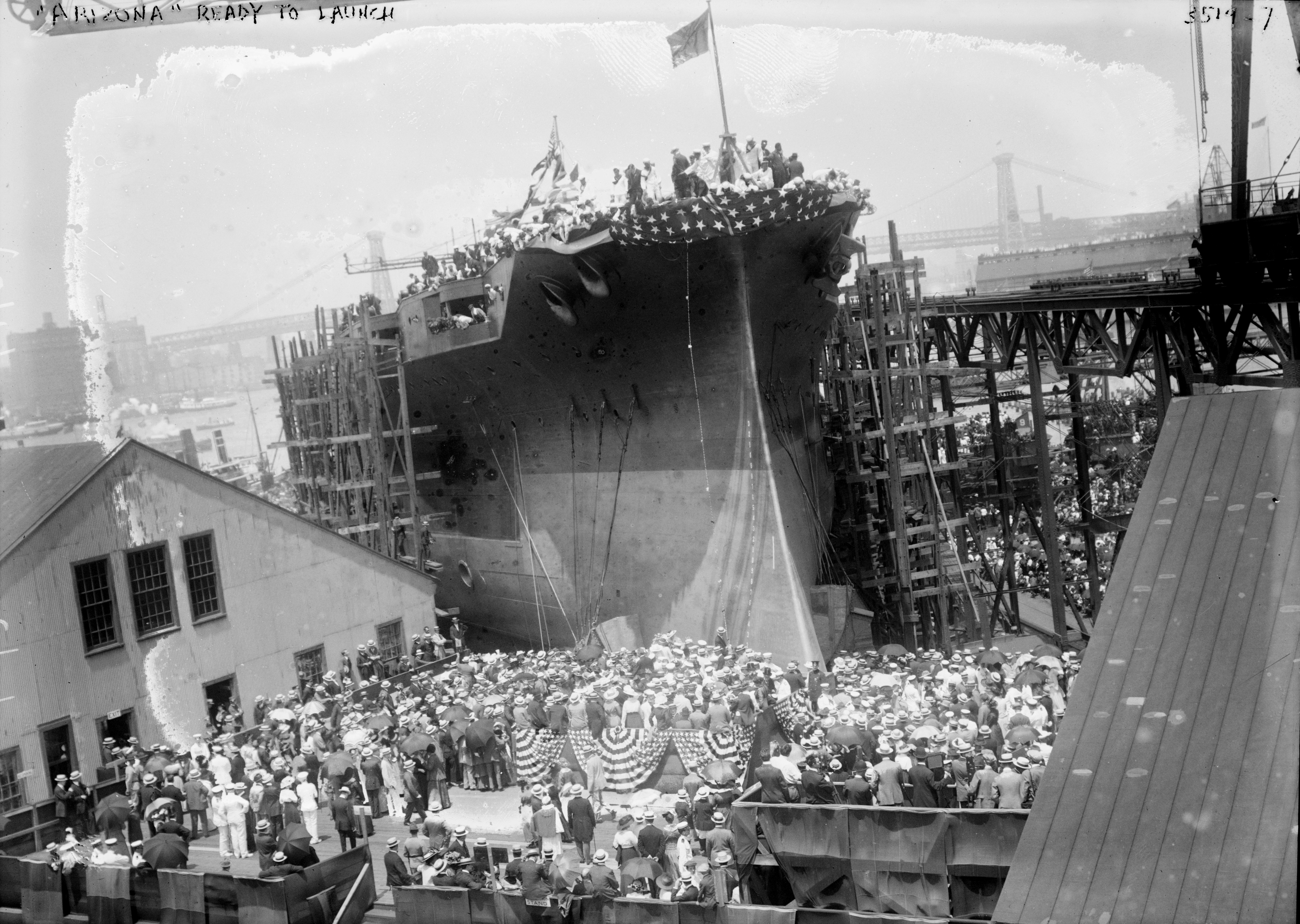
Stern-first launch of the battleship USS Arizona (BB-39) in 1915 at the Brooklyn Navy Yard

Normally, ways are arranged perpendicular to the shore line (or as nearly so as the water and maximum length of vessel allows) and the ship is built with its stern facing the water. Where the launch takes place into a narrow river, the building slips may be at a shallow angle rather than perpendicular, even though this requires a longer slipway when launching. (Note: The National Shipyards at Chepstow are an example.) Modern slipways take the form of a reinforced concrete mat of sufficient strength to support the vessel, with two "barricades" that extend well below the water level taking into account tidal variations. The barricades support the two launch ways. The vessel is built upon temporary cribbing that is arranged to give access to the hull's outer bottom and to allow the launchways to be erected under the complete hull. When it is time to prepare for launching, a pair of standing ways is erected under the hull and out onto the barricades. The surface of the ways is greased. (Tallow and whale oil were used as grease in sailing ship days.) A pair of sliding ways is placed on top, under the hull, and a launch cradle with bow and stern poppets is erected on these sliding ways. The weight of the hull is then transferred from the build cribbing onto the launch cradle. Provision is made to hold the vessel in place and then release it at the appropriate moment in the launching ceremony; common mechanisms include weak links designed to be cut at a signal and mechanical triggers controlled by a switch from the ceremonial platform.

On launching, the vessel slides backwards down the slipway on the ways until it floats by itself.

=== Sideways ===
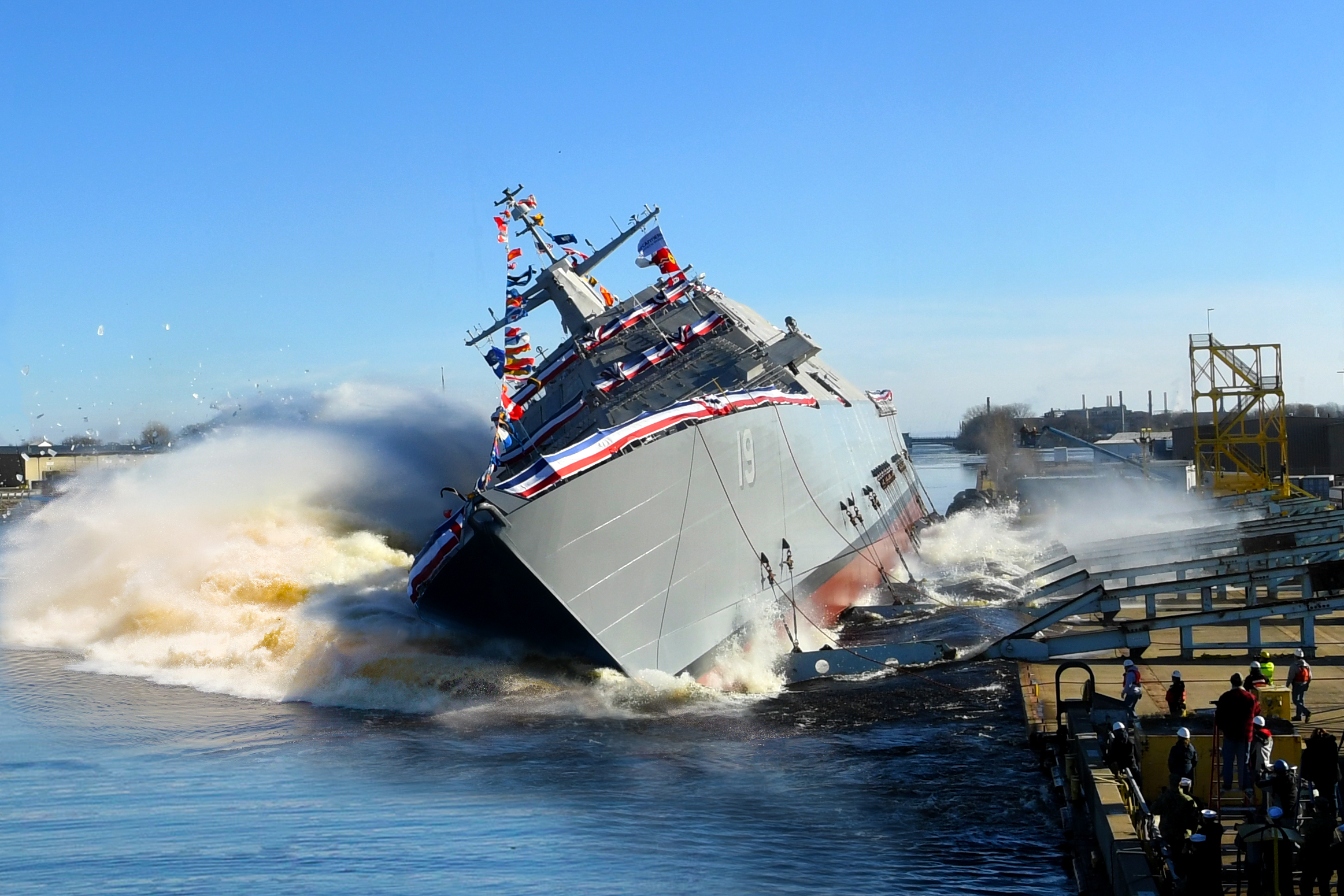
Sideways launch of littoral combat ship USS St. Louis (LCS-19) in 2018

Some slipways are built so that the vessel is side-on to the water and is launched sideways. This is done where the limitations of the water channel would not allow lengthwise launching, but occupies a much greater length of shore. The Great Eastern designed by Brunel was built this way, as were many landing craft during World War II. This method requires many more sets of ways to support the weight of the ship.

=== Air-bag ===
Sometimes ships are launched using a series of inflated tubes underneath the hull, which deflate to cause a downward slope into the water. This procedure has the advantages of requiring less permanent infrastructure, risk, and cost. The airbags provide support to the hull of the ship and aid its launching motion into the water, thus this method is arguably safer than other options such as sideways launching. These airbags are usually cylindrical in shape with hemispherical heads at both ends.

== Traditions ==
=== Ancient ===
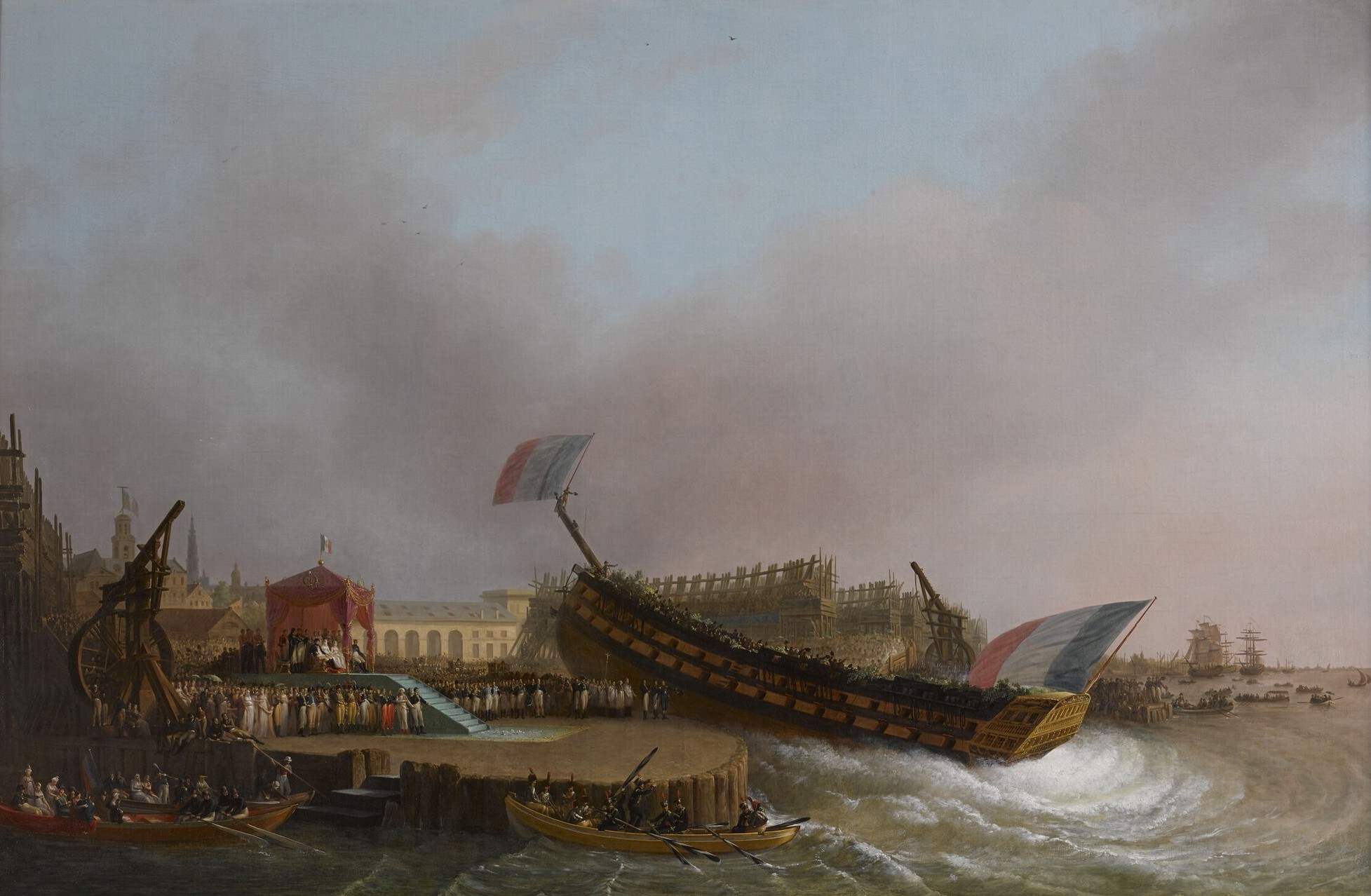
French ship of the line Friedland being launched stern first on 2 May 1810 in Antwerp

A Babylonian narrative dating from the 3rd millennium BC describes the completion of a ship:

Openings to the water I stopped;
I searched for cracks and the wanting parts I fixed:
Three sari of bitumen I poured over the outside;
To the gods I caused oxen to be sacrificed.

It is believed that ancient Egyptians, Greeks, and Romans called on their gods to protect seamen. Favor was evoked from the monarch of the seas—Poseidon in Greek mythology, Neptune in Roman mythology. Ship launching participants in ancient Greece wreathed their heads with olive branches, drank wine to honor the gods, and poured water on the new vessel as a symbol of blessing. Shrines were carried on board Greek and Roman ships, and this practice extended into the Middle Ages. The shrine was usually placed at the quarterdeck, an area which continues to have special ceremonial significance.

Different peoples and cultures shaped the religious ceremonies surrounding a ship launching. Jews and Christians customarily used wine and water as they called upon God to safeguard them at sea. Intercession of the saints and the blessing of the church were asked by Christians. Ship launchings in the Ottoman Empire were accompanied by prayers to Allah, the sacrifice of sheep, and appropriate feasting.

Chaplain Henry Teonge of Britain's Royal Navy left an interesting account of a warship launch, a "briganteen of 23 oars," by the Knights of Malta in 1675:

Two fryers and an attendant went into the vessel, and kneeling down prayed halfe an houre, and layd their hands on every mast, and other places of the vessel, and sprinkled her all over with holy water. Then they came out and hoysted a pendent to signify she was a man of war; then at once thrust her into the water.

=== Early Modern Age ===
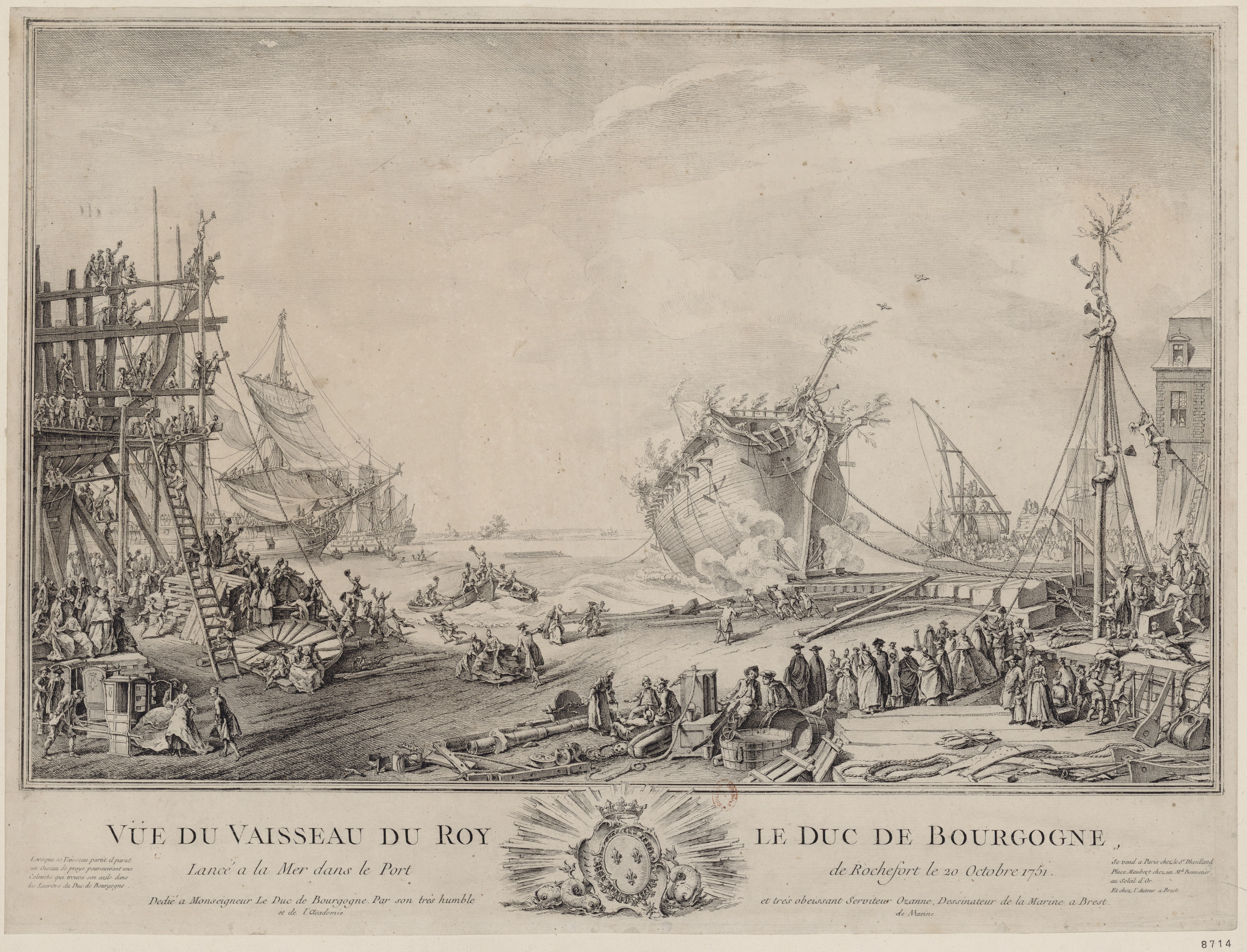
The side launch of French ship Duc de Bourgogne at Rochefort on 20 October 1751.

The liturgical aspects of ship christenings, or baptisms, continued in Catholic countries, while the Reformation seems to have put a stop to them for a time in Protestant Europe. By the 17th century, for example, English launchings were secular affairs. The christening party for the launch of the 64-gun ship of the line Prince Royal in 1610 included the Prince of Wales and famed naval constructor Phineas Pett, who was master shipwright at the Woolwich yard. Pett described the proceedings:

The noble Prince… accompanied with the Lord Admiral and the great lords, were on the poop, where the standing great gilt cup was ready filled with wine to name the ship SO soon as she had been afloat, according to ancient custom and ceremony performed at such times, and heaving the standing cup overboard. His Highness then standing upon the poop with a selected company only, besides the trumpeters, with a great deal of expression of princely joy, and with the ceremony of drinking in the standing cup, threw all the wine forwards towards the half-deck, and solemnly calling her by name of the Prince Royal, the trumpets sounding the while, with many gracious words to me, gave the standing cup into my hands.

The "standing cup" was a large cup fashioned of precious metal. When the ship began to slide down the ways, the presiding official took a ceremonial sip of wine from the cup, and poured the rest on the deck or over the bow. Usually the cup was thrown overboard and belonged to the lucky retriever. As navies grew larger and launchings more frequent, economy dictated that the costly cup be caught in a net for reuse at other launchings. Late in 17th century Britain, the standing-cup ceremony was replaced by the practice of breaking a bottle across the bow.

== By country ==
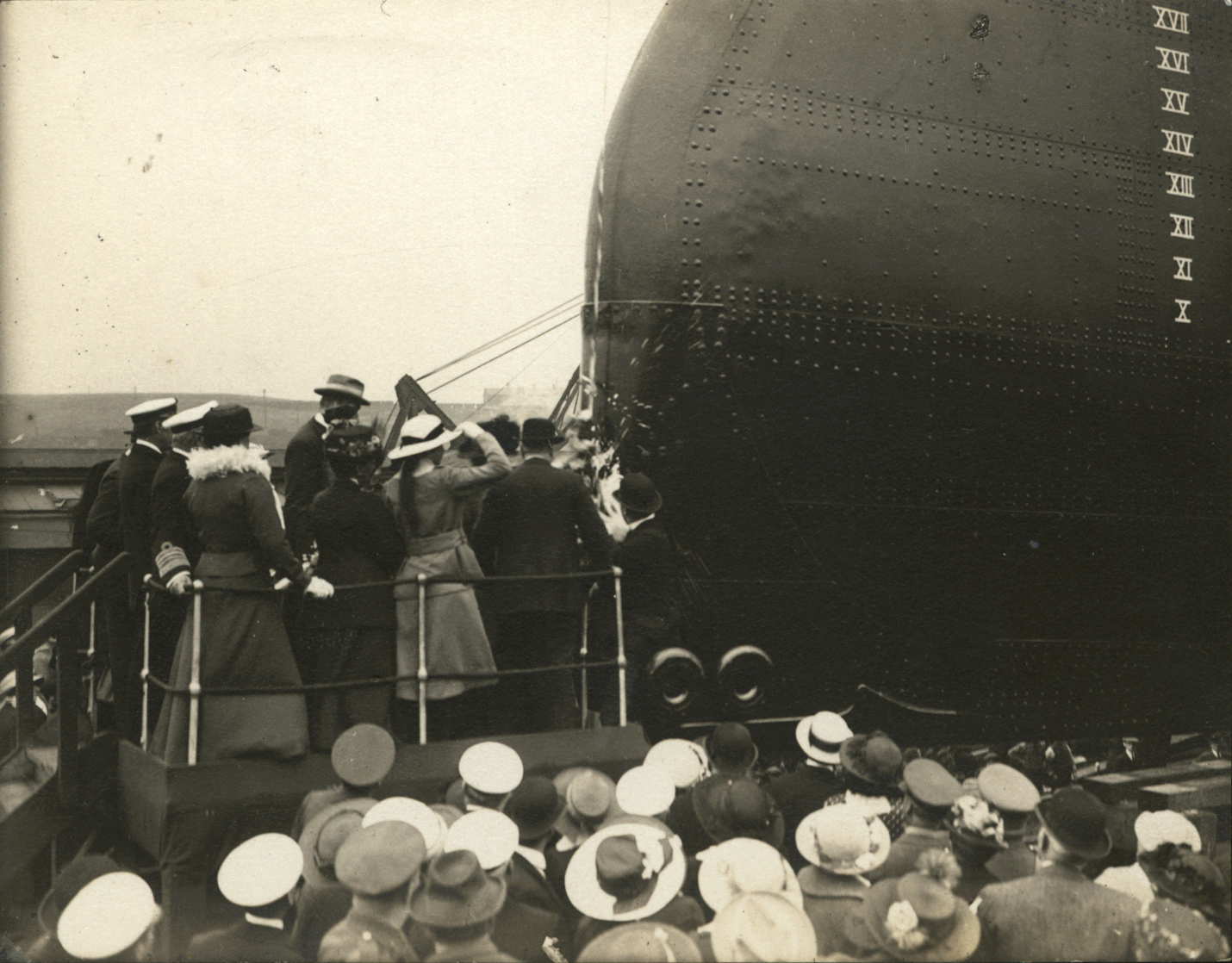
The launch of Brazilian Navy battleship Minas Geraes at Elswick on 10 September 1908

Launching could be said to mark the birth of a vessel; and people throughout history have performed launching ceremonies, in part to appeal for good fortune and the safety of each new vessel.

=== Canada ===
In Canada, Aboriginal peoples will perform ceremonies at the launching of vessels along with other methods of launching.

=== France ===
French ship launchings and christenings in the 18th and early 19th centuries were accompanied by unique rites closely resembling marriage and baptismal ceremonies. A godfather for the new ship presented a godmother with a bouquet of flowers as both said the ship's name. No bottle was broken, but a priest pronounced the vessel's name and blessed it with holy water.

=== India ===
In India, ships have historically been launched with a Puja ceremony that dedicates the ship to a Hindu god or goddess, and seeks blessings for her and her sailors. Historically, Hindu priests would perform the puja ceremony at launch. In the 20th century, ships were launched with a lady breaking a coconut on the bow of the vessel, which is sometimes followed by a small Puja.

=== Japan ===
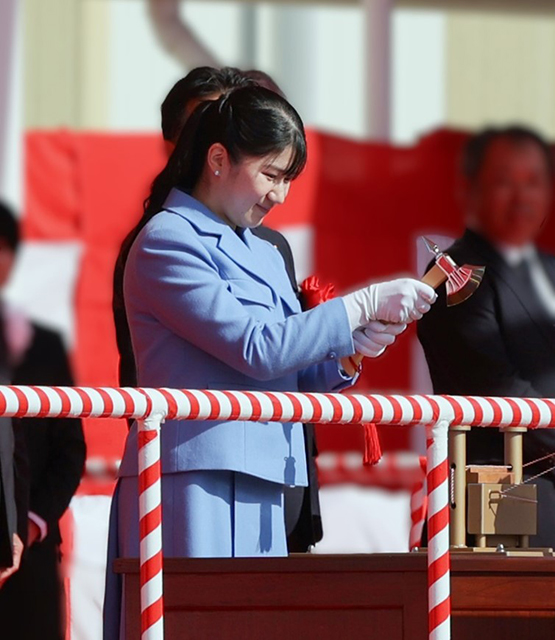
Princess Aiko cuts a rope with a silver axe at launching ceremony of Mirai II

Japanese ship launchings incorporate silver axes which are thought to bring good luck and scare away evil. Japanese shipbuilders traditionally order the crafting of a special axe for each new vessel; and after the launching ceremony, they present the axe to the vessel's owner as a commemorative gift. The axe is used to cut the rope which tethers the ship to the place where she was built.

=== United Kingdom ===
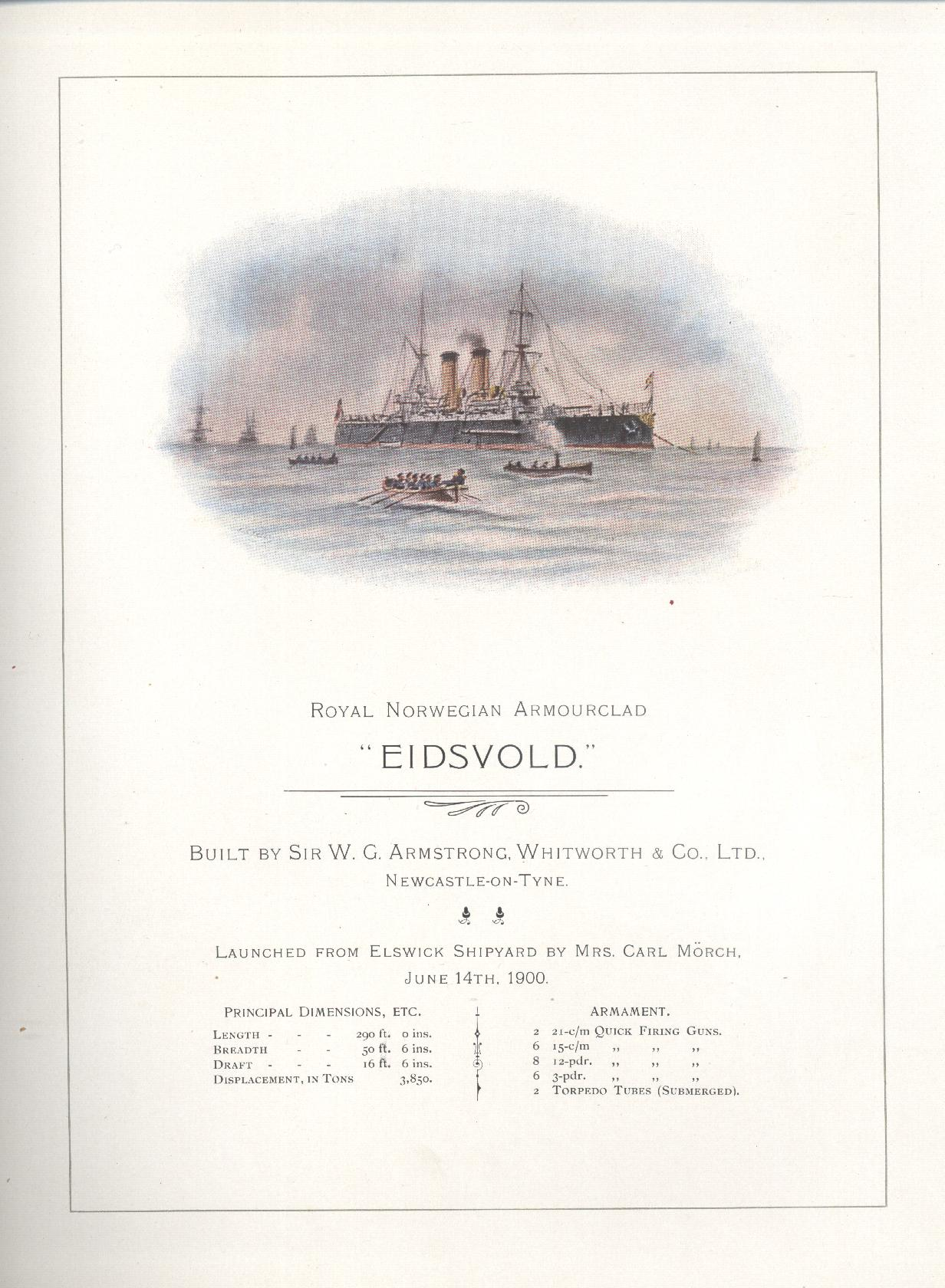
Eidsvold launch card in Tyne & Wear Archives & Museums collection item 450/1, launched at Elswick 14 June 1900 for the Royal Norwegian Navy.

Sponsors of British warships were customarily members of the royal family, senior naval officers, or Admiralty officials. A few civilians were invited to sponsor Royal Navy ships during the nineteenth century, and women became sponsors for the first time. In 1875, a religious element was returned to naval christenings by Princess Alexandra, wife of the Prince of Wales, when she introduced an Anglican choral service in the launching ceremony for the battleship Alexandra. The usage continues with the singing of Psalm 107 with its special meaning to mariners:

They that go down to the sea in ships;
That do business in great waters;
These see the works of the Lord, and His wonders in the deep.

In 1969, Queen Elizabeth II named the ocean liner Queen Elizabeth 2 after herself, instead of the older liner RMS Queen Elizabeth, by saying, "I name this ship Queen Elizabeth the Second. May God bless her and all who sail in her." On 4 July 2014, the Queen named the Royal Navy's new aircraft carrier HMS Queen Elizabeth with a bottle of single malt Scotch whisky from the Bowmore distillery on the island of Islay instead of champagne because the ship had been built and launched in Scotland. The Duchess of Rothesay similarly launched HMS Prince of Wales by pulling a lever which smashed a bottle of single malt Scotch whisky at the side of the ship.

CalMac ferry Glen Rosa launching at Ferguson Marine shipyard on 9 April 2024.

At the 2024 launching of CalMac ferry Glen Rosa, newly-qualified welder Beth Atkinson named the ship and pulled a lever to similarly smash a bottle, of single malt from the Ardgowan distillery at nearby Inverkip.

Shipyard ephemera is a rich source of detail concerning a launch and this was often material produced for the audience of the day and then thrown away. Tyne & Wear Archives & Museums has many of these items from Tyne and Wear shipyards. A number can be seen in Commons. The 1900 piece for Eidsvold reproduced in this article lists a woman performing the launch.

=== United States ===
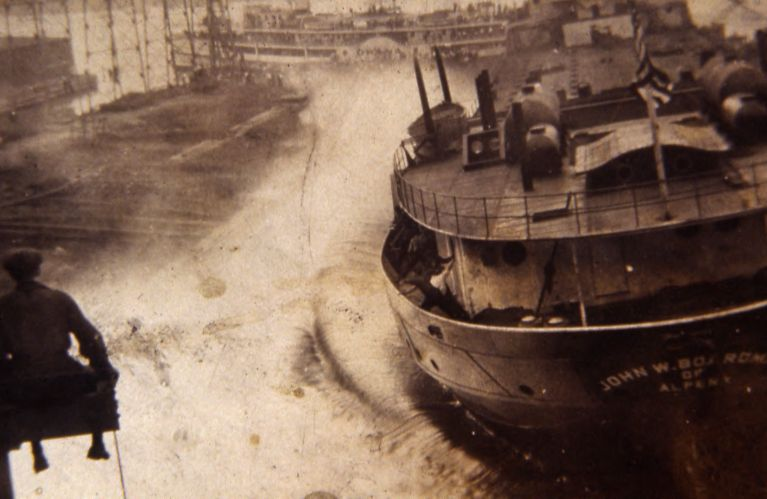
Launching of the John W. Boardman cargo ship from the Toledo Shipyard, Toledo, Ohio, 1916

Ceremonial practices for christening and launching ships in the United States have their roots in Europe. Descriptions are not plentiful for launching American Revolutionary War naval vessels, but a local newspaper detailed the launch of Continental frigate Raleigh at Portsmouth, New Hampshire, in May 1776:

On Tuesday the 21st inst. the Continental Frigate of thirty-two guns, built at this place... was Launched amidst the acclamation of many thousand spectators. She is esteemed by all those who are judges that have seen her, to be one of the compleatest ships ever built in America. The unwearied diligence and care of the three Master-Builders... and the good order and industry of the Carpenters, deserve particular notice; scarcely a single instance of a person's being in liquor, or any difference among the men in the yard during the time of her building, every man with pleasure exerting himself to the utmost: and altho' the greatest care was taken that only the best of timber was used, and the work perform'd in a most masterly manner, the whole time from her raising to the day she launched did not exceed sixty working days, and what afforded a most pleasing view (which was manifest in the countenances of the Spectators) this noble fabrick was completely to her anchors in the main channel, in less than six minutes from the time she run, without the least hurt; and what is truly remarkable, not a single person met with the least accident in launching, tho' near five hundred men were employed in and about her when run off.

It was customary for the builders to celebrate a ship launching. Rhode Island authorities were charged with overseeing construction of frigates Warren and Providence. They voted the sum of fifty dollars (equivalent to $1,400 in 2025) to the master builder of each yard "to be expended in providing an entertainment for the carpenters that worked on the ships." Five pounds (equivalent to $100 in 2025) was spent for lime juice for the launching festivities of frigate Delaware at Philadelphia, Pennsylvania, suggesting that the "entertainment" included a potent punch with lime juice as an ingredient.

No mention has come to light of christening a Continental Navy ship during the American Revolution. The first ships of the Continental Navy were Alfred, Cabot, Andrew Doria, and Columbus. These were former merchantmen, and their names were assigned during conversion and outfitting. Later, Congress authorized the construction of thirteen frigates, and no names were assigned until after four had launched.

The first description that we have of an American warship christening is that of Constitution at Boston, October 21, 1797, famous as "Old Ironsides." Her sponsor was Captain James Sever, USN, who stood on the weather deck at the bow. "At fifteen minutes after twelve she commenced a movement into the water with such steadiness, majesty and exactness as to fill every heart with sensations of joy and delight." As Constitution ran out, Captain Sever broke a bottle of fine old Madeira over the heel of the bowsprit.

Frigate President had an interesting launching on April 10, 1800, at New York:

Was launched yesterday morning, at ten o'clock, in the presence of perhaps as great a concourse of people as ever assembled in this city on any occasion. At nine, captain Ten-Eyck's company of artillery..., accompanied by the uniform volunteer companies of the sixth regiment and the corps of riflemen, marched in procession... and took their station alongside the frigate. Everything being prepared, and the most profound silence prevailing,... At a given signal she glided into the waters, a sublime spectacle of gracefulnes and grandeur. Immediately on touching the water federal salutes were fired from the sloop of war Portsmouth, the revenue cutter Jay and the Aspasia, Indiaman. These were returned by the uniform companies on shore, who fired a feu-de-joye, and marched off the ground to the battery... and were dismissed.

As the 19th century progressed, American ship launchings continued to be festive occasions, but with no set ritual except that the sponsor(s) used some "christening fluid" as the ship received her name.

Sloop of war Concord was launched in 1828 and was "christened by a young lady of Portsmouth." This is the first known instance of a woman sponsoring a United States Navy vessel. The contemporaneous account does not name her. The first identified woman sponsor was Lavinia Fanning Watson, daughter of a prominent Philadelphian. She broke a bottle of wine and water over the bow of sloop-of-war Germantown at Philadelphia Navy Yard on August 22, 1846.

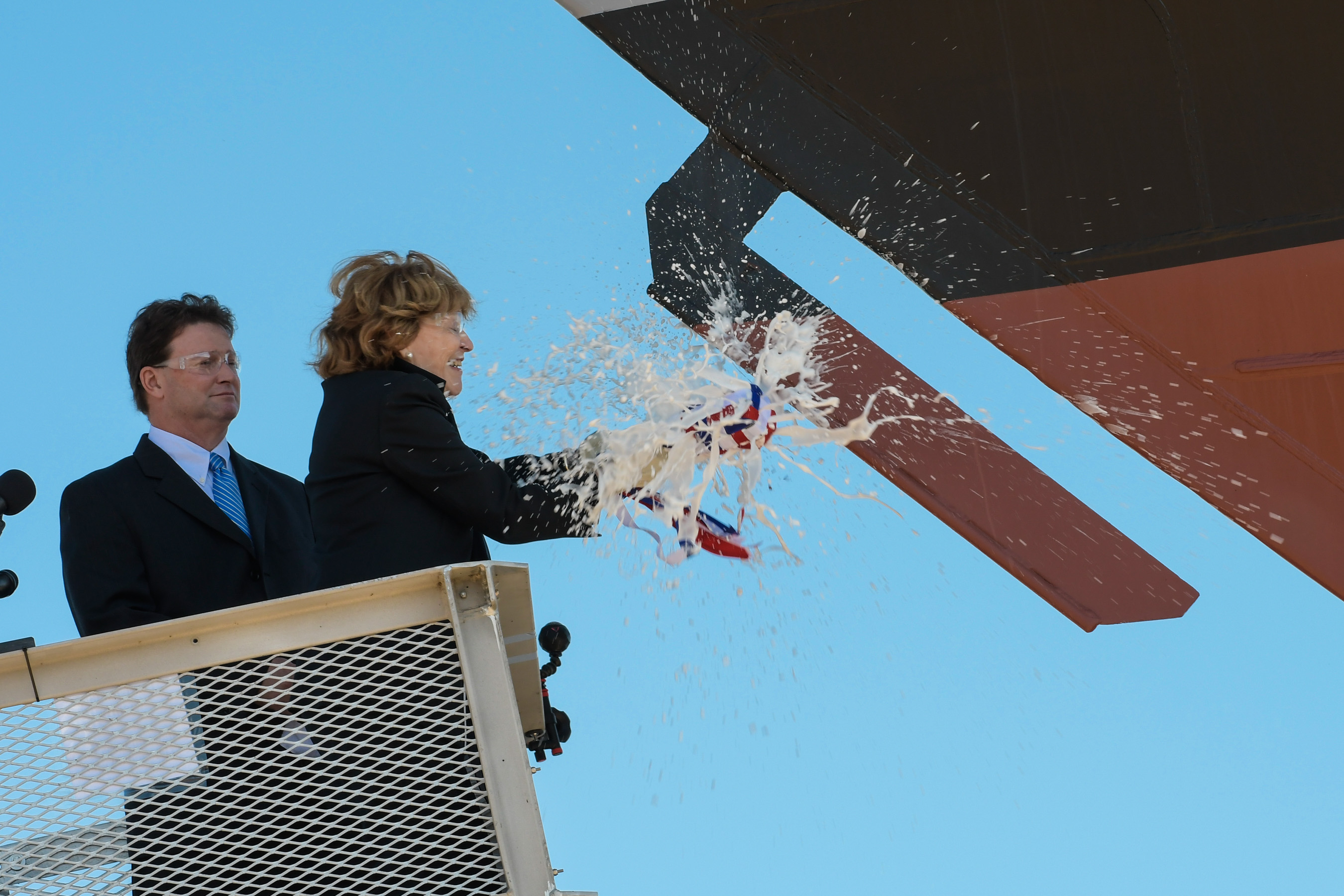
Kate Lehrer, sponsor of the future USS Wichita (LCS 13), breaks a bottle of champagne across LCS-13's bow during the ship's christening ceremony.

Women as sponsors became increasingly the rule, but not universally so. As sloop-of-war Plymouth "glided along the inclined plane" in 1846, "two young sailors, one stationed at each side of her head, anointed her with bottles, and named her as she left her cradle for the deep." As late as 1898, the torpedo boat MacKenzie was christened by the son of the builder.

Wine is the traditional christening fluid, although numerous other liquids have been used. Princeton and Raritan were sent on their way in 1843 with whisky. Seven years later, "a bottle of best brandy was broken over the bow of steam sloop San Jacinto." Steam frigate Merrimack earned her place in naval history as Confederate States of America ironclad Virginia, and she was baptized with water from the Merrimack River. Admiral David Farragut's famous American Civil War flagship steam sloop Hartford was christened by three sponsors; two young ladies broke bottles of Connecticut River water and Hartford, Connecticut spring water, while a naval lieutenant completed the ceremony with a bottle of sea water.

Champagne came into popular use as a christening fluid as the 19th century closed. A granddaughter of Secretary of the Navy Benjamin F. Tracy wet the bow of Maine, the Navy's first steel battleship, with champagne at the New York Navy Yard on November 18, 1890. The effects of national prohibition on alcoholic beverages were reflected to some extent in ship christenings. Cruisers Pensacola and Houston, for example, were christened with water; the submarine V-6 with cider. However, battleship California appropriately received her name with California wine in 1919. Champagne returned in 1922, but only for the launch of light cruiser Trenton.

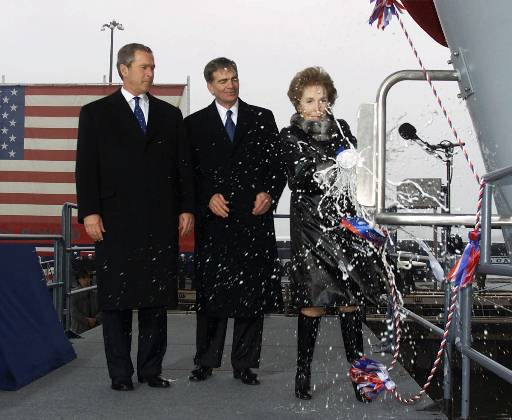
First Lady Nancy Reagan christens the nuclear-powered aircraft carrier USS Ronald Reagan (CVN-76) on 4 March 2001

Rigid naval airships Los Angeles, Shenandoah, Akron, and Macon were built during the 1920s and early 1930s, carried on the Naval Vessel Register, and each was formally commissioned. The earliest First Lady of the United States to act as sponsor was Grace Coolidge who christened the airship Los Angeles. Lou Henry Hoover christened Akron in 1931, but the customary bottle was not used. Instead, the First Lady pulled a cord which opened a hatch in the airship's towering nose to release a flock of pigeons.

Thousands of ships of every description came off the ways during World War II, the concerted effort of a mobilized American industry. The historic christening and launching ceremonies continued, but travel restrictions, other wartime considerations, and sheer numbers dictated that such occasions be less elaborate than those in the years before the war.

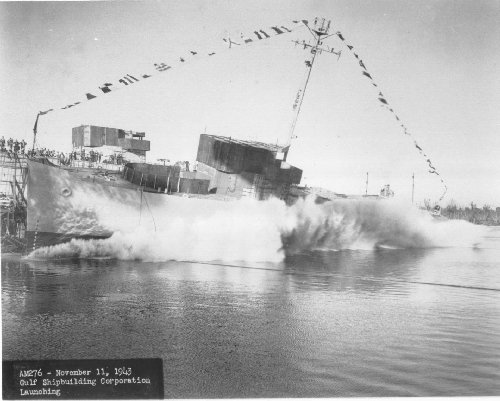
Minesweeper USS Pivot (AM-276) launched at the Gulf Shipbuilding Company, Chickasaw, Alabama in 1943.

On 15 December 1941, the United States Maritime Commission announced that as a war-time measure all formal launching ceremonies would be discontinued for merchant ships being constructed under its authority, though simple informal ceremonies could continue without reimbursement to builders.

In recent history, all U.S. Navy sponsors have been female. In addition to the ceremonial breaking of a champagne bottle on the bow, the sponsor remains in contact with the ship's crew and is involved in special events such as homecomings.

== Incidents ==
- SS Daphne sank moments after her launching at a shipyard in Govan, Glasgow, Scotland on 3 July 1883. As Daphne moved into the river, the anchors failed to stop the ship's forward progress. The starboard anchor moved only 6–7 yards (5.5–6.4 m), but the port anchor was dragged 60 yards (55 m). The current of the river caught Daphne and flipped it onto its port side, sinking it in deep water. 124 died including many young boys, some of whose relatives were there on shore.
- HMS Albion launched on 21 June 1898. Albion created a wave with her entry into the water after the Duchess of York christened her. The wave caused a stage to collapse on which 200 people were watching; it slid into a side creek, and 34 people drowned, mostly women and children. This was probably one of the first-ever ship launchings to be filmed.
- In 1907, the Italian ocean liner Principessa Jolanda capsized and sank upon launch.
- In 2011, the luxury boat SS Jiugang sank at launch in Lanzhou, China.
- North Korean destroyer Kang Kon capsized while being launched sideways on May 21, 2025 at Chongjin. The ship was righted and officially launched the following month.

== See also ==
- Ship class naming conventions
- United States ship naming conventions
- Russian ship naming conventions
- Japanese ship-naming conventions
- Hull classification symbol
- Ship commissioning
- Ship sponsor
- Lists of ship launches
