= History of the Russian Navy =

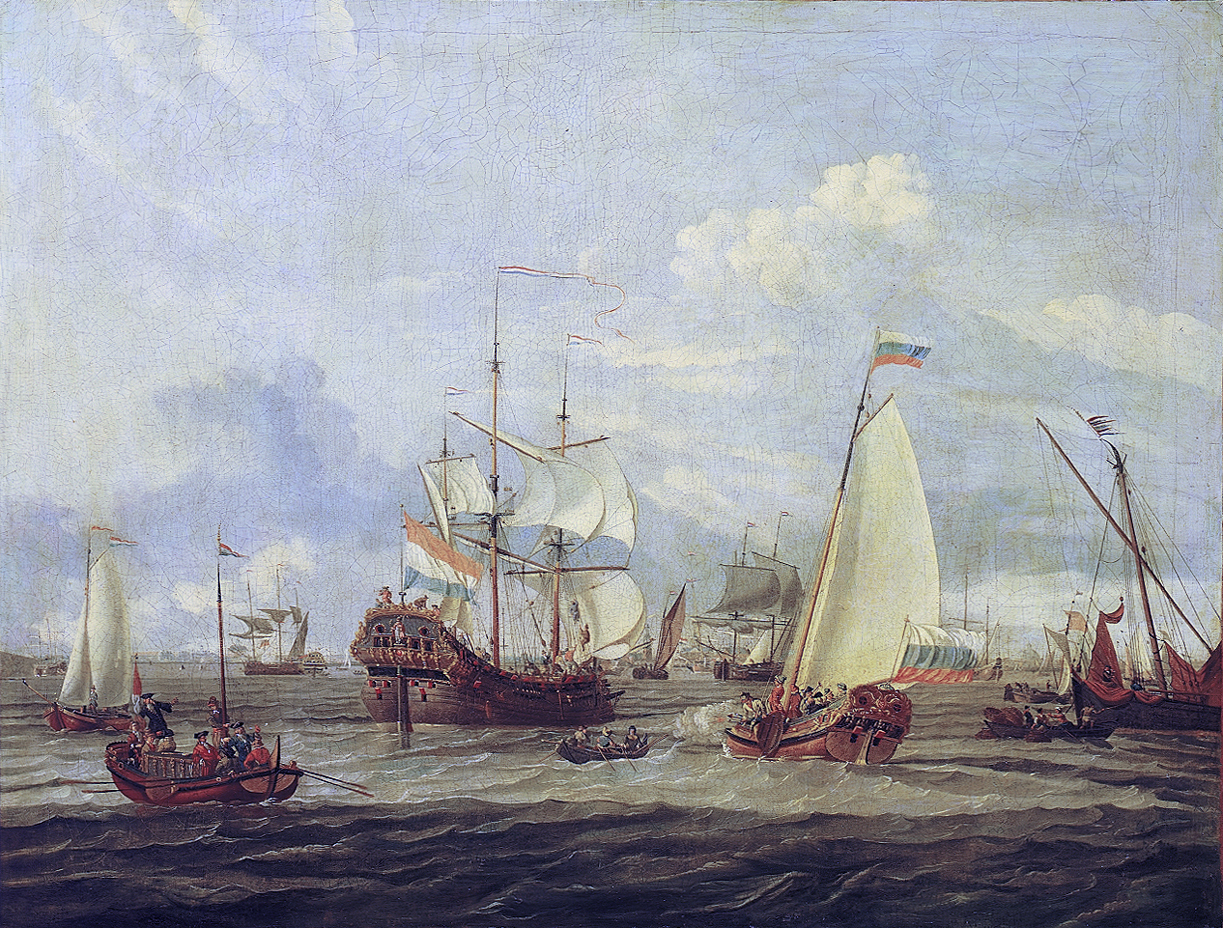
Peter the Great inspecting a ship at Amsterdam during his Grand Embassy to Europe, 1697-98

In his work, "The Seapower of the State", Soviet Admiral Sergei Gorshkov stated: "To understand better the possibilities of the present-day fleet and to gain an idea of its lines of development in the future, it is very useful to look at the processes of its development in the past and the role played by navies in the system of armed forces of the states in strengthening their independent position".

In this regard, sea power usually played a secondary role as Russia expanded, though at times it was closely associated with the desire of particular Russian rulers to secure warm water ports and access to the open sea. Such an objective fueled Peter the Great's desire to secure access to the Baltic Sea, to develop Russian navigation in the Arctic and to build the Russian Navy. It was also a component of Catherine the Great's Greek Project which envisaged securing Russian access to the Turkish Straits. And it fueled Russia's later drive to develop its access to the Pacific Ocean. These objectives were not ones that were consistently pursued by Russian governments. However, when they were pursued they often brought Russia into conflict with neighbouring states, and other Great Powers, making them part of any examination of Russia's naval history.

Strategically, the Russian Navy has always faced two overarching issues: securing access to the high seas through warm water ports and the reality of a vast land mass that separates the various seas to which Russia has tried to gain access. As a result, as Russia tried to develop a fleet in the Arctic or pushed toward the Baltic Sea, the Black Sea or the Pacific, separate naval groupings were compelled to develop in relative isolation from each other.

The origins of Russia's development of maritime capabilities can be traced back more than one thousand years. Admiral Gorshkov traced the origins of Russian naval art to the seventh century A.D., when "our forefathers engaged in armed combat on the Black Sea." However, it was in the 9th century that the Kievan Rus' joined forces with Varangian/Norse warriors to attack Constantinople. The fleet formed at the time was irregular and primarily used for raids against Byzantium, five of which are said to have occurred in the period between 907 and 1043.

The Mongol Empire's destructive invasion in the 13th century led to the dissolution of the Kievan state and its fleet. The Novgorod Republic, which had access to open seas through the Baltic and White Seas, and had used its fleet in warfare against the Swedes and other neighbouring principalities, was able to avoid the worst of the Mongol invasion, though it was still necessary for Prince Alexander Nevsky (1221–1263) to yield to Mongol hegemony. By the 14th century, all trade routes in Black, Caspian, and Baltic Seas were lost, although Novgorod continued to navigate the White Sea.

== 16th century up to the reign of Peter the Great ==
Under the rule of Ivan the Terrible (1533–1584), the Grand Duchy of Moscow began its expansion toward the Pacific Ocean and attempted, unsuccessfully, to gain access to the Baltic and Black Seas. In 1570, in order to support Russian navigation on the Baltic Sea, Ivan created a flotilla which existed for about a year.

Emblem of the Russian Navy

Naval Ensign of the Russian Federation

In the 17th century, the Russian sailors actively studied the seas of the Arctic Ocean and the Arctic Ocean itself. By the end of the century, they reached the Pacific Ocean. In 1648 the Russian sailor Semyon Dezhnev discovered the Bering Strait which separates Asia and the Americas.

Marine operations were actively conducted during the Russo-Swedish War of 1656–1658. Thus, a detachment of Governor of Brovsky Peter Potemkin was sent to Izhora Land part of Sweden. The detachment acted in a support of flotilla belonging to the Don Cossacks, who had experience of the sea trips in the Black Sea. The whole army of Potemkin consisted of 570 Don Cossacks and 430 local volunteers. In June 1656, Potemkin and his unit crossed the border to Sweden and on June 13, 1656, besieged the fortress of Notburg. Part of the detachment were sent to the mouth of Neva River and on July 10, 1656, he occupied the Nyenschantz fortress left by the Swedes, located at the mouth of Okhta River, at the confluence of Okhta and Neva rivers. Then Governor Potemkin with a part of his forces and flotilla of the Don Cossacks landed on the Kotlin Island. On August 1, 1656, decisive naval battle took place between the Cossack flotilla and the Swedish Navy near the Kotlin Island. The Russians broke out through the Swedes gunfire and took the flagship-6 ships to boarding. The rest of the Swedish ships were forced to retreat. The battle was won by the Cossacks and they captured the 12 Swedish galleys, naval equipment and also a number of Swedish soldiers including their commander. The battle near the Kotlin Island didn't give any significant impact on the course of Russo-Swedish War of 1656–58, according to the terms of the peace treaty of 1661 between the Grand Duchy of Moscow and the Swedish Empire, Russians destroyed their all ships on the Baltic. However, the Battle of Kotlin was marked by historians as the first victory of the modern Russian Navy.

The first Russian ship of the Western European style, the Orel Frigate, was built in 1667.

== Founding of the Russian Navy under Peter the Great ==
Peter the Great (reigned 1682–1725) created the first regular Russian navy.

In May 1688, the young Tsar Peter who was barely 16 years at the time discovered a small boat that had been presented to his father Alexis of Russia (Tsar of Russia, 1645–1676). After the repairing of the boat, Tsar Peter gained experience in handling the vessel on the Yauza river and the Prosyanoye pond. The amusing fleet created by Peter in 1688 - 1693, was the forerunner of the regular Russian fleet.

Further events developed at the White Sea. Peter I's interest in the only Russian seaport at that time was Arkhangelsk, arose simultaneously with the plan to build a fleet. Tsar Peter arrived in Arkhangelsk at the summer of 1693. On August 7, 1693, Tsar arrived at Kholmogory, where he was received by Andrey Matveyev and on July 30, 1693, he finally reached to Arkhangelsk. Over two months, the Tsar spent in Arkhangelsk, he met with the ship business and commercial operations of the commercial people and ordered the construction of the first shipbuilding shipyard in Russia on Solombala Island. From the middle of the 17th century, the shipyard, which already had slipways, workshops, warehouses, and other ancillary enterprises, became known as the Arkhangelsk Admiralty. On September 28, 1693, Tsar Peter himself laid the naval ship here – the 24-gun frigate Saint Paul.

Next, Peter I turned his gaze to the Azov and Black Seas. As a result, the regular fleet was also laid in the shipyards of the Voronezh Admiralty. The campaign of the Russian Army to the Ottoman Empire's Azov Fortress in 1695 ended in failure - the siege of the fortress had no success. The complete blockade of Azov failed because the Russians did not have a fleet. The fortress was supplied with fighters, provisions and ammunition from the sea by the Ottoman Navy.

Only in the winter of 1695-1696 the first ships and ships were built, and the Second Azov campaign proved successful. On June 6, 1696, the fleet built in the Voronezh Admiralty shipyards entered the Sea of Azov and cut off the fortress of Azov from sea sources, and in late July the Azov garrison surrendered. On July 30, 1696, the fortress Lyutikh, located at the mouth of the northernmost arm of the Don, also surrendered. Since 1696, the founding day of the Russian Navy, October 30, is celebrated every year.

In 1697 Peter embarked on his 17-month Grand Embassy to Europe, a leading purpose of which was to study ship construction techniques and naval tactics of European Great Powers in order to initiate modernization and similar naval construction in Russia.

The Baltic Fleet was built under Peter the Great during the Great Northern War of 1700 - 1721. Constructions of galley fleets were launched in 1702 until 1704. A sailing fleet of ships built in Russia and bought in other countries was created to protect the conquered coasts and to attack the enemy sea routes of communication in the Baltic Sea. In the years 1703 - 1723 the main naval base of the Baltic fleet was in Saint Petersburg and later in Kronstadt. The new bases were established in Vyborg, Helsingfors (Helsinki), Reval (Tallinn) and Åbo (Turku). In July/August 1714, Peter's fleet in the Baltic defeated a Swedish fleet at the Battle of Gangut.

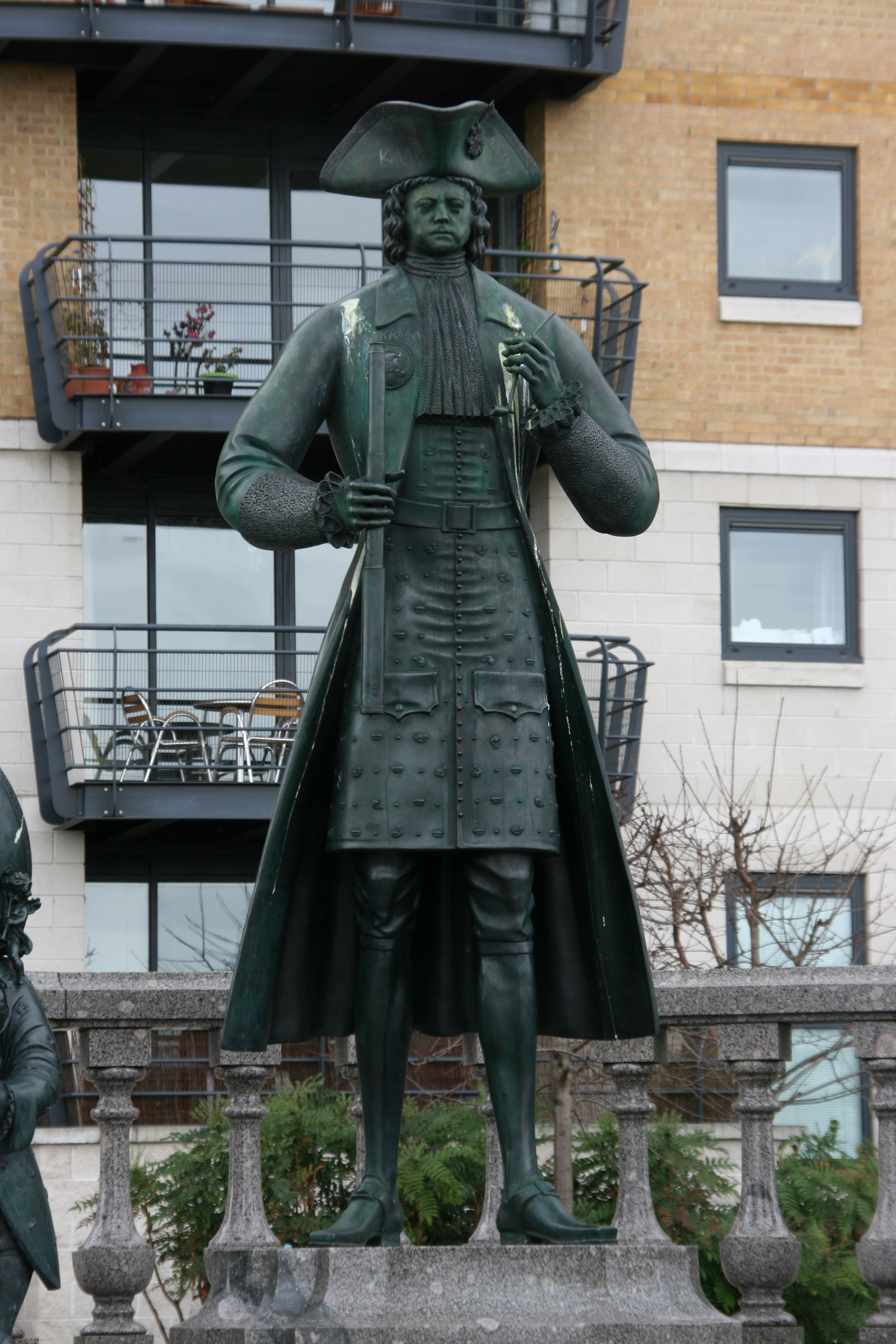
Statue of Peter the Great, Deptford, London

Nevertheless, during the latter years of Peter's reign, Russia's gains in the south had to be surrendered to the Turks during the Russo-Turkish War of 1710 to 1713. The resurgence of Russia's position in the south advanced marginally as a result of the Russo-Turkish War of 1735 to 1739, and then accelerated markedly during the reign of Catherine the Great (1762–1796).

In 1722, Peter the Great created the Caspian Flotilla. Led by the admiral Fyodor Apraksin, the Flotilla participated in Peter's Persian campaign of 1722–1723 though most of the gains made during that conflict were subsequently lost and it would be left to the reign of Catherine the Great to reignite Russian ambitions in the region.

In 1725, the Russian Empire had 130 sailing ships, including 36 ships of the Line, 9 frigates, 3 Snow and 77 auxiliary vessels. The army fleet consisted of 396 ships, including 253 galleys and 143 brigantines. The ships were built in 24 shipyards which were located in the following cities: Voronezh, Kazan, Pereslavl-Zalessky, Arkhangelsk, Olonets, Saint Petersburg, and Astrakhan. Naval officers coming from the families of nobleman and sailors were recruited from the common citizens. Service in the navy was for life and there was no retirement. Young officers studied in the school of mathematics and navigation sciences founded in 1701 and often were sent abroad for training. Foreigners can also join the naval service, for example Scottish Thomas Gordon served as the commander of Kronstadt port.

== The Russian Navy after the death of Peter the Great ==
Very quickly after the death of Peter the Great, the Imperial Russian Navy deteriorated sharply. In 1728, the Swedish envoy to Russia informed his government about the situation of the Russian Navy:

"Despite the annual construction of the galleys, the Russian galley fleet, compared with the former, is greatly reduced; the ship's ship is falling into direct ruin, because the old ships are all rotten, so more than four or five ships of the line cannot be brought into the sea, and the construction of new ones has weakened. In the admiralty, such disregard is such that even in three years the fleet cannot be brought back to its former condition, but no one thinks about it."

During the reign of Peter II (1727–30), given the limited interest of the young Tsar and the ruling Privy Council in naval affairs, the intensity of the combat training of fleet crews sharply decreased. In April 1728, at a meeting of the Supreme Privy Council the 12-year old emperor ordered that only four frigates and two flutes go out to sea from the entire fleet, and five more frigates were ready for cruising. The remaining ships were to remain in the ports for "saving the treasury. " To the arguments of those who asserted that it was necessary to keep the fleet at sea, the emperor replied: When necessity requires the use of ships, I will go to sea; but I do not intend to stroll along it like my grandfather. The poor state of the treasury and irregular salary payments led to an outflow of officers, which caused a drop in discipline among soldiers and sailors.

The condition of the galley fleet, which included 120 galleys, was relatively satisfactory. In 1726, Vice-Admiral Peter Sivers proposed to introduce a peaceful state for the galley fleet, which was implemented in 1728. Constantly 90 galleys afloat were kept on the fleet, another 30 galleys kept the forests prepared for quick assembly.

At the end of 1731, the ship fleet consisted of 36 battleships, 12 frigates and 2 shnyavas, but only 29.63% of the regular number of battleships were fully combat-ready, another 18.52% could operate in the Baltic only in the most favorable season, without storms. In total, Russia could launch into the sea 8 fully operational battleships and 5 into the closest voyage in the Baltic. All the ships of major ranks – 90, 80, 70-guns – failed. Only one 100-gun ship, five 66-gun guns and seven 56 62-gun guns remained combat-ready and partially combat-ready.

== Navy under Anna of Russia (1730–1740) ==
When she became Empress of Russia a principal objective for Anna of Russia was to rebuild the Russian fleet to enable it to rank with other dominant naval powers. On August 1, 1730, she issued a personal decree ''On the maintenance of the galley and ship fleets according to the regulations and charters" .

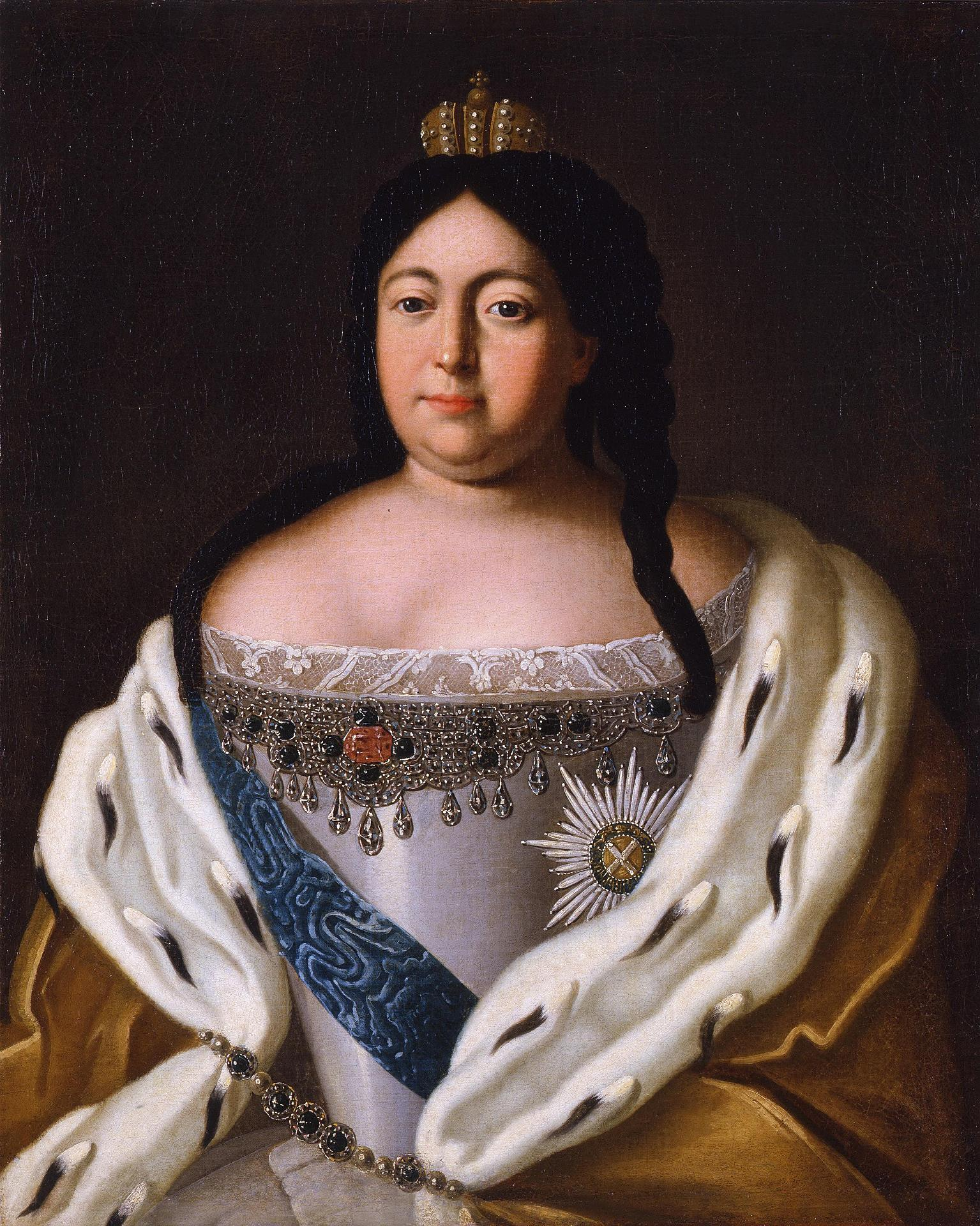
Empress Anna (ruled 1730 to 1740) painting at the Hermitage Museum, Saint Petersburg

In December 1731, Empress Anna ordered the Baltic fleet to resume active exercises in order to "have this and people’s training and genuine inspection of ships, because in the harbor it's impossible to inspect the ship’s rigging and other damage".

In 1732, the Military Maritime Commission established itself under the chairmanship of Vice-Chancellor Andrey Ostermanto reform the fleet, which included Vice-admiral Nikolai Govolin, Vice-admiral Naum Senyamin, Vice-admiral Thomas Sanders, Rear-admiral Peter Bredal and Rear-admiral Vasily Mamonov. A management reform was introduced and the new fleets were added.

Comparison of 1726 and 1732 Russian fleets:

| Ships | 1726 Russian fleet | 1732 Russian fleet |
|---|---|---|
| Battleships | 7 | 27 |
| Frigates | 15 | 58 |
| Snow ships | 9 | 41 |
| Total ships | 89 | 175 |

The total number of battleships grow from 7 to 27. The total gunpower of the fleet also grow rapidly.

Under Peter the Great, Vitus Bering had been hired and tasked to search for a route to America from Kamchatka. Empress Anna subsequently put Bering in charge of the five Great Northern Expeditions, from 1733 to 1742. Thousands of kilometers of the coast from the White Sea to Anadyr were mapped for the first time.

In August 1732, a historic decision was made to restore the port of Arkhangelsk (closed in 1722) and the military shipbuilding in Solombala, which played a huge role in the development of fleet and shipbuilding. The Solombala Shipyard became the second main construction base of Baltic fleet and became operational in 1734. During the reign of Empress Anna († 1740), 52% of all Baltic fleet ships were built in Solombala shipyard and later during the reign of Empress Elizabeth, 64% of the ship were built in Saint Petersburg.

The restoration of Arkhangelsk shipyard made it possible to quickly deploy the construction of a large number of ships at once. The Arkhangelsk shipyard became in fact the main shipbuilding base of the Baltic fleet. The availability of skilled labours, the shorter delivery times and its better organisation led to the fact that the cost and construction time of the ships in Arkhangelsk were less than in St. Petersburg.

In 1734, during the War of the Polish Succession (1733–35), the Russian fleet (which included the 100-gun first-rate ship Peter I & II and the 32-gun frigates Russia and Mitau) under Thomas Gordon proved instrumental in deciding the Siege of Danzig in Russia's favor. Although the Mitau was captured by the French Navy, French intervention in the war failed to prevent the fall of the city to the Russians. The French lost the frigate Brilliant and the Russians were successful in ensuring that their claimant, August III, ascended to the Polish throne.

Despite the decline of the shipbuilding program due to War with the Ottomans (1735–1739), when the Dnieper and the Azov flotillas were in heavy construction under the reign of Empress Anna there was certain progress in the Russian fleet. After the end of the war with Turkey, the Admiralty resumed intensive fleet construction as soon as possible.

Timeline of battleships of the Baltic Fleet
| 1720 | 1727 | 1731 | 1739 |
|---|---|---|---|
| 32 | 2 | 4 | 34 |

== Imperial Russian Navy in the second half of the 18th century ==
In the second half of the 18th century, the Russian fleet was strengthened due to an expansion of Russian imperial ambitions and a series of wars that began with the Ottoman Empire over domination of the Black Sea. Starting with the Russo-Turkish War (1768–1774), Russia and the Ottoman Empire fought seven wars up to the First World War (1914–1918). During the Battle of Chesma in 1770, ships under the command of Admiral Grigory Spiridov (deploying on a six-month transit from the Baltic) defeated the Ottoman flotilla and achieved dominance in the Aegean Sea. While the Russians attempted to foment and support a revolt against the Ottomans in Greece, the Russian fleet was unable to provide sufficient land forces in support and the revolt was crushed.

In the Black Sea in 1771, Russians captured the coasts of Kerch Strait. The Russo-Turkish War of 1768-74 ended with Russian victory. As a result, the entire coast of the Azov Sea passed to Russian control. Crimea was declared as an independent state under the Russian protection and later in 1783 it became a full part of Russia. In 1778 the port of Kherson was established, in which the first ship of the Black Sea Fleet was launched in 1783.

By the end of the 18th Century, the reign of Catherine the Great had ushered in extensive plans to strengthen the Russian Navy. The Baltic fleet was to comprise nine 100-gun ships, twenty-seven 74s, nine 66s, nine 44s, one 40 and nine 32s. In turn, the Black Sea Fleet was to consist of three 100s, nine 74s, three 66s, six 50s and four 36s. However, plans were delayed and, for instance, the first 100-gun ships for Black Sea Fleet were not able to be launched until 1801–02.

During the Russo-Turkish War of 1787–1792 Russian control over Crimea was confirmed and Russian naval forces under the command of Admiral Fyodor Ushakov defeated the Turkish fleet at the Battle of Kerch Strait in 1790, preventing the Turks from landing a force in Crimea; while Ushakov's victory at Tendra allowed the Russians to begin the siege of Izmail, a potent Ottoman stronghold by the Black Sea, which was twice besieged without effect.

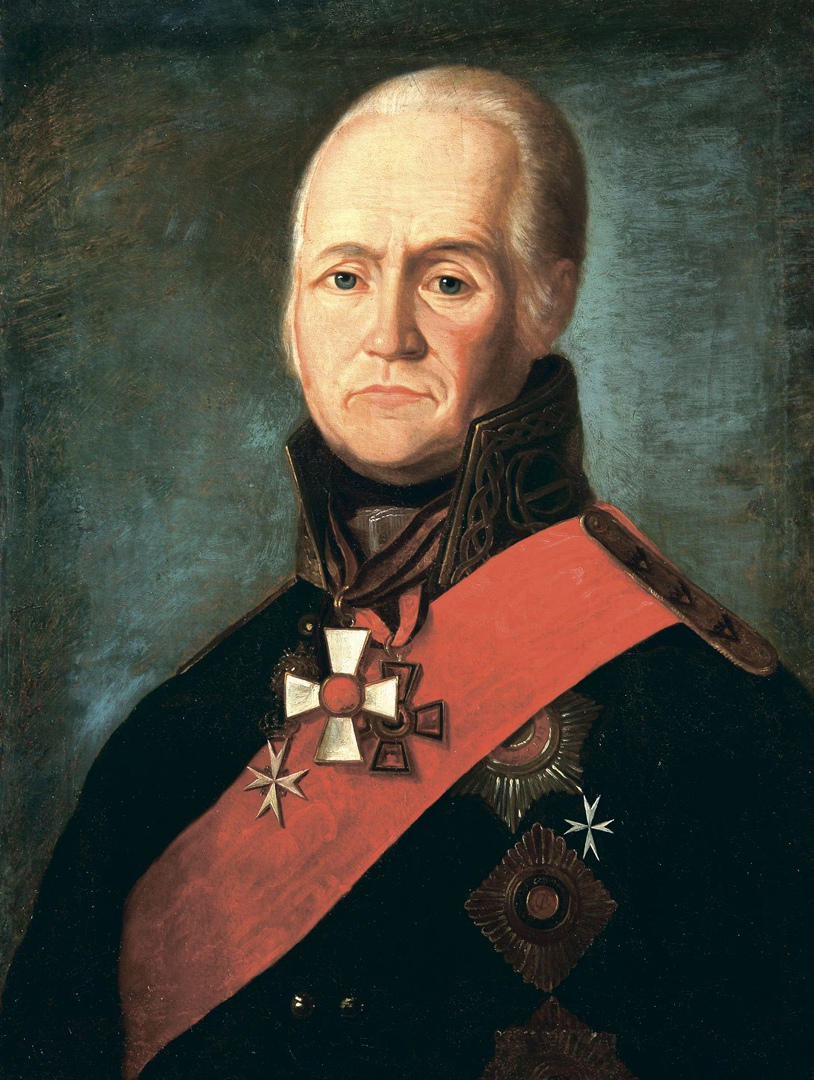
Admiral Fedor Fedorovich Ushakov

In the Caspian region, the reestablishment of Russia's naval presence assisted the Russian army in capturing Derbent and Baku during the Persian Expedition of 1796. By the time of the Treaty of Gulistan in 1813 (which ended the Russo-Persian War (1804–1813)), Russia was unchallenged on the Caspian Sea.

With the onset of the French Revolutionary Wars (1792–1802), Russia initially remained neutral but later joined the allies during the War of the Second Coalition which began in 1798. A Russian fleet, deployed under the command of Admiral Ushakov, coordinated with the Turks, and acted against French forces during the Siege of Corfu. The resulting victory led to the establishment of the Septinsular Republic with the island of Corfu then serving as a base for Russian naval units in the Mediterranean operating against the French until Russia signed a separate peace with France in the Treaty of Paris in 1801.

== Early 19th century ==
In the beginning of the 19th century, after the destruction of the combined French and Spanish fleets at the Battle of Trafalgar, the Russian Navy became the 2nd largest naval force in the world behind the British Royal Navy. The Black Sea Fleet had 74 battleships and 124 frigates in 1834, the Baltic Fleet had 87 battleships and 212 frigates in the following year.

Between 1803 and 1855, Russian navigators made more than 40 round of the world and long-distance journeys, which played a significant role in the development of Far East.

Russian Fleets at the beginning

of the 19th century

Black Sea Fleet
Baltic Fleet
Caspian Flotilla
White Sea Flotilla
Okhotsk Flotilla

Turkey and Russia again went to war in the Russo-Turkish War of 1806–1812. The Russian fleet (deploying from the Baltic, but joining some vessels of the Black Sea Fleet already in the Mediterranean prior to the outbreak of war) under the command of Admiral Dmitry Senyavin played an instrumental role in this conflict securing victories at both the Battle of the Dardanelles (1807) and the Battle of Athos (also in 1807). However, after the Peace of Tilsit between Russia and Napoleonic France in 1807 (which ended the War of the Fourth Coalition in which Russia had again been at war with France), the United Kingdom became an enemy and much of the Russian Fleet, under Admiral Seniavin, was interned in Britain with its crews repatriated to Russia. Eight two-decker vessels and two frigates were turned over to the British and laid up. In this condition they gradually deteriorated and only two ships returned to Russia in 1813 after Russia had again become a British ally. A large number of other Russian vessels in the Mediterranean ended up in French hands.

During the French invasion of Russia, the navy assisted in sustaining Russian forces in the city of Riga during its siege by French and Prussian forces from July to December 1812. However, the Russian fleet played a minor role in the defeat of the French during the War of the Sixth Coalition that followed.

After the end of the Napoleonic Wars (1803–15), the Russians (deploying again from the Baltic), together with the British and French, intervened in the latter years of the Greek War of Independence (1821–29) defeating the Turkish fleet at the Battle of Navarino in 1827 and helping to secure Greek independence. Turkish closure of the Dardanelles Straits then sparked a renewed Russo-Turkish conflict from 1828 to 1829 which led to the Russians gaining further territory along the eastern Black Sea.

The restriction imposed on the Black Sea Fleet by Turkish control of the Straits was influential in motivating periodic Russian attempts to secure control of the passage, which became a recurrent theme in Russian policy. From 1841 onward, the Russian fleet was formally confined to the Black Sea by the London Straits Convention.

== Crimean War (1853-56) ==
The slow economic and industrial development of Russia in the first half of the 19th century caused its lag behind Europe and more specifically, the British Empire. By the beginning of the Crimean War in 1853, Russia had the Black Sea, Baltic, Caspian and Okhotsk fleets, with a total of 49 battleships, 28 frigates, 30 corvettes and 36 old galleys ready for the war. The total number of fleet personnel was 137,082.

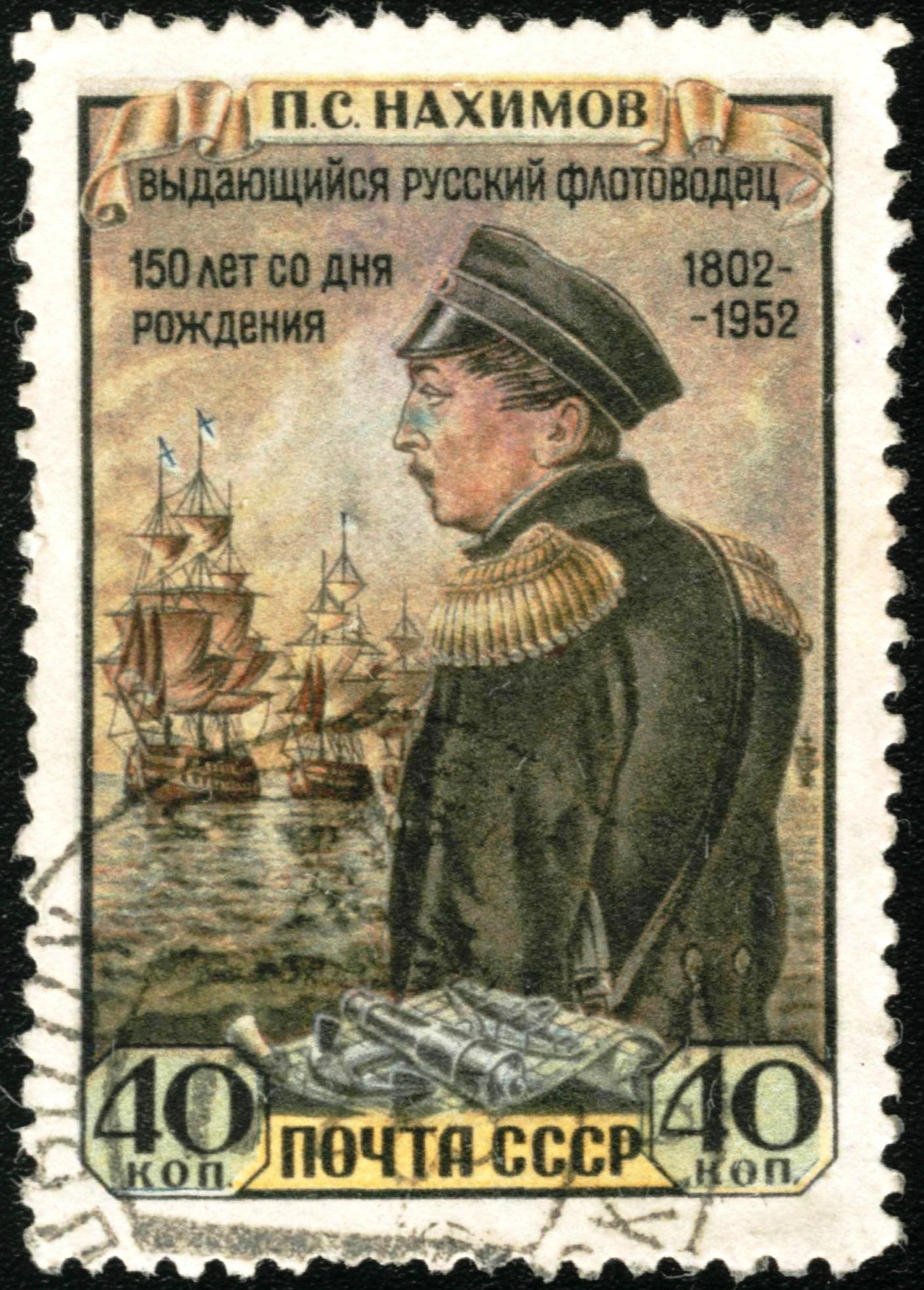
Admiral Nakhimov on a 1952 Soviet stamp

In 1853, the Black Sea Fleet, commanded by Admiral Pavel Nakhimov, destroyed Turkish naval forces at the Battle of Sinop after the Turks had declared war on Russia. Nevertheless, during the ensuing Crimean War, the Russians were placed on the defensive and the allies were able to land their forces in Crimea and, ultimately, capture Sevastopol.

The British and French deployed a powerful task force of ships, commanded by Admiral Sir Charles Napier to the Baltic in early 1854. The British component of the fleet consisted of 18 ships with 1,160 guns, led by the 131-gun flagship HMS Duke of Wellington. French warships under Vice Admiral Alexandre Parseval-Deschenes, joined the British task force. On the surface, Anglo-French intervention in the Baltic achieved only limited overt military successes. However, strategically it tied up five-eighths of Russian naval strength and almost half of the country's land forces defending the Baltic coast even as these forces were needed in Crimea.

In the Pacific, the Okhotsk Military Flotilla was able to assist in defeating a combined Franco-British assault force during the defence of Petropavlovsk in 1854. Although heavily outnumbered, the Russian garrison, supported by the frigate Aurora and the transport vessel Dwina, defeated the Anglo-French force. Despite local military successes, Russia's experience in the Crimean War led it to acknowledge the inherent weaknesses of its position in the Pacific, and in 1867 it consolidated its territorial holdings by selling Alaska to the United States in hopes of offsetting British interests in the Pacific.

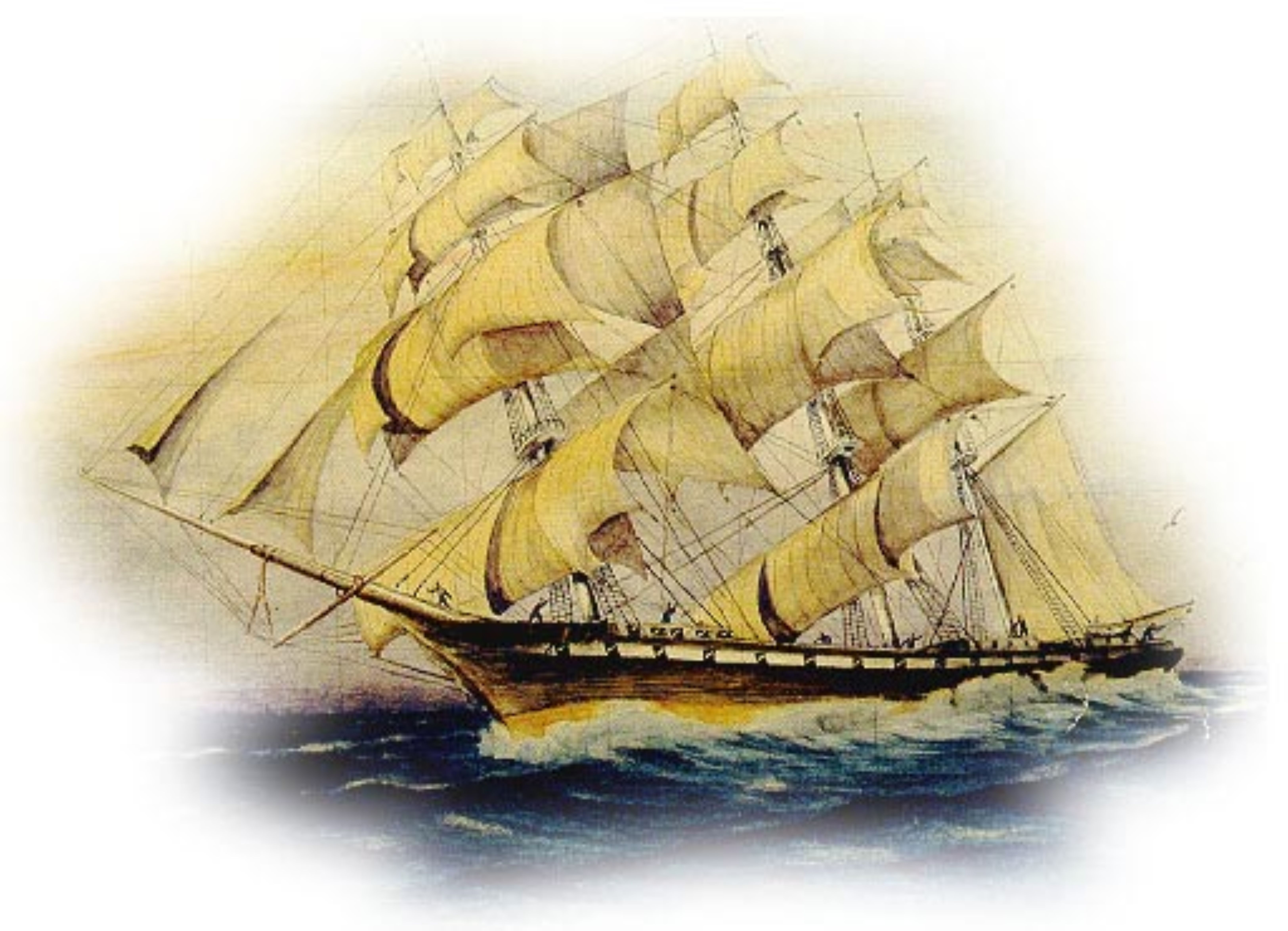
Russian frigate Aurora (1854)

In the Black Sea, Russia's position was even weaker and, as a result of the Crimean War, the 1856 Treaty of Paris prohibited Russian naval units and fortifications on the Black Sea and neutralized the Black Sea.

== Late 19th century ==
After the Crimean War, Russia undertook to reconstruct its navy. Several armoured ships were built and an emphasis was placed on the development of mine and torpedo warfare, resulting in the construction of minelayers and torpedo boats.

In 1870 Russia had repudiated the limitations imposed on its navy in the Treaty of Paris. However, when the Russo-Turkish War of 1877–1878 began, Russian naval forces in the region remained weak. According to analysis by Alfred Brainard "The lack of an effective Russian navy on the Black Sea dominated the Russian strategy in the Balkans throughout the war". In the aftermath of the conflict, Russia moved to reconstitute its naval strength and fortifications in the Black Sea so as to avoid facing similar vulnerability in the future. However, despite having emerged victorious in the war with Turkey, through the 1878 Treaty of Berlin the other Great Powers limited the scope of Russia's victory. Notably, the Treaty reaffirmed that warships could not pass through the Turkish Straits in peacetime thereby effectively confining Russia's Black Sea Fleet to that body of water.

The Russian navy continued to expand in the late 19th century, especially during the reign of Emperor Nicholas II. The Imperial Navy was strongly influenced by the work of the American naval theorist, Alfred Mahan. Given restrictions in the capacity of Russian industry, the country looked to foreign assistance in building its fleet.

Starting in 1898 with the Russian occupation and lease of Port Arthur in southern Manchuria, Russia took steps to enhance its position in the Far East and strengthen its military and naval forces in the region. Japan came to view Russia's build-up as a threat, and Russia's occupation of Port Arthur itself as an unacceptable humiliation, after having been forced out of the region by Russia, Germany and France in 1895.

During the Boxer Rebellion in 1900, Russian ground and naval forces in the Far East played an important role in the allied campaign to quell anti-Western elements in China. The Russian Navy assisted in capturing the Chinese forts at Taku which blocked the mouth of the Pei-Ho River.

== Russo-Japanese War (1904-05) ==
On the night of February 8, 1904 the Imperial Japanese Navy under the command of Tōgō Heihachirō began military operations against the Russian Empire without a declaration of war. As a result of the sudden attack on Port Arthur, two Russian battleships were seriously damaged by torpedoes. This attack developed into a full-scale battle known as the Siege of Port Arthur. The next morning, several attempts by the Japanese Navy to attack the Russian fleet failed due to coastal artillery fire and return fire from the Russian ships that the Japanese had failed to destroy.

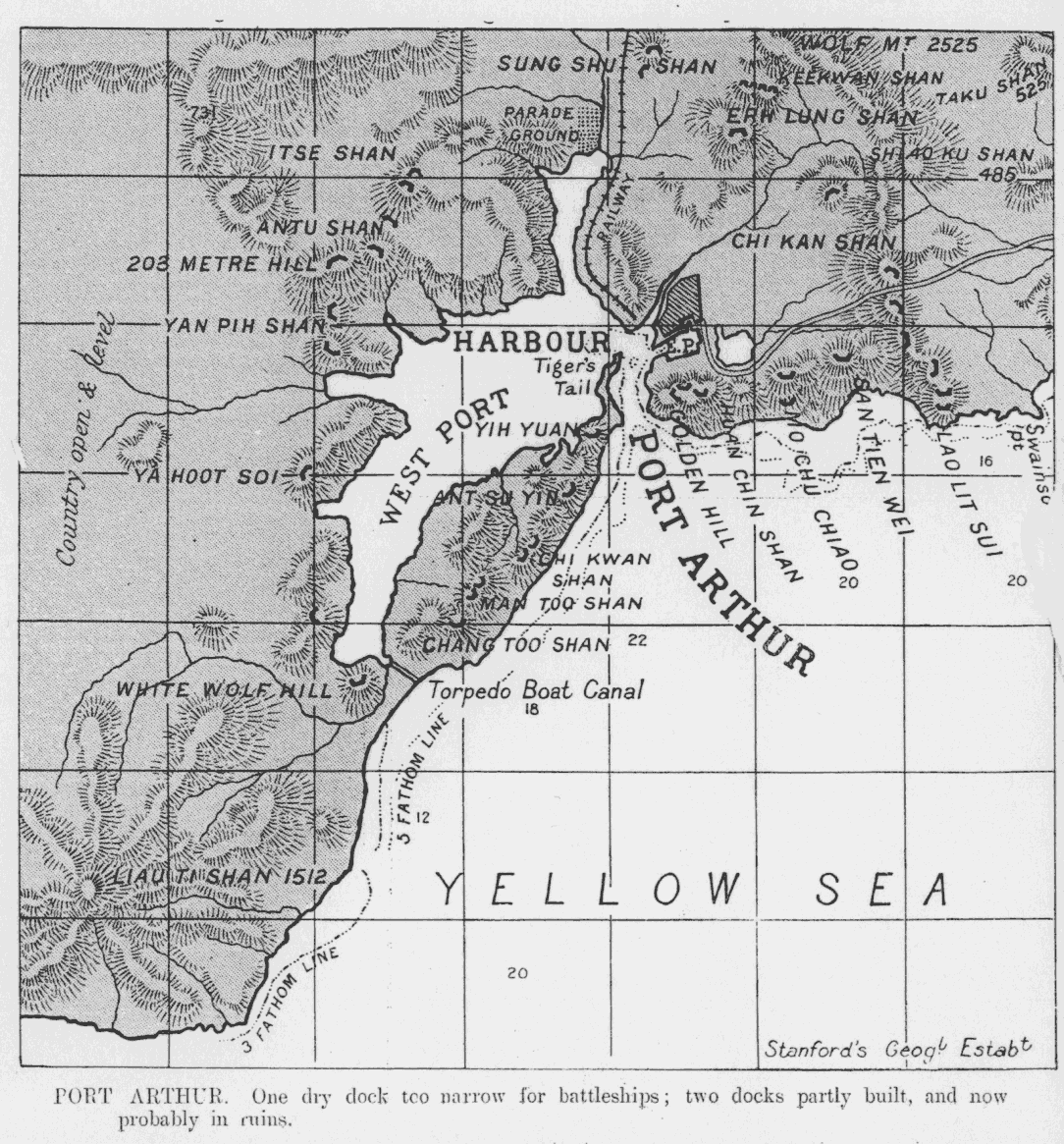
Map of Port Arthur

After failing to completely destroy the Russian fleet at Port Arthur, the Japanese fleet tried to close off access to it. The attempt to totally seal off the port was also unsuccessful.

In March, Vice Admiral Stepan Makarov took command of the First Pacific Squadron to lift the Japanese blockade of Port Arthur. By that time, both sides began to widely use the tactics of mining sea lanes near the ports. For the first time in history, mines were used by the attacking side - before that, mines were used only for defensive purposes in order to prevent enemy ships from gaining access to the harbor. Vessels of the fleet sortied to combat Japanese attacks but were reluctant to leave the harbour for full battle on the high seas, especially after the death of Admiral Makarov on April 13, 1904, when he went down with the Russian battleship Petropavlovsk after the ship hit at least one mine.

The Japanese tactics of using mines were quite effective and significantly limited the maneuverability of Russian ships. Soon the Russians adopted the Japanese mining tactics and began to use it for their own purposes. On May 15, 1904, two Japanese battleships, Yashima and Hatsuse, stumbled upon a fresh minefield and exploded after impacting at least two mines each.

The Russian fleet under the command of Rear Admiral Vitgeft made an attempt to break the blockade and go to Vladivostok, but was intercepted and turned back after the battle of the Yellow Sea. The remnants of the Russian squadron in Port Arthur were targeted by Japanese artillery besieging Port Arthur. Attempts to break the blockade of Port Arthur from the land also failed, and after the Battle of Liaoyang in late August, Russian forces retreated to Mukden (Shenyang) where another battle was fought and lost by the Russians in February/March 1905. Port Arthur itself had fallen to the Japanese on January 2, 1905.

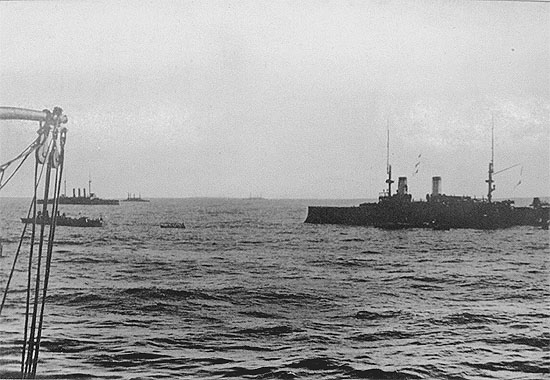
End of the battle of Tsushima: Following the wounding of Admiral Rozhestvensky, Admiral Nikolai Nebogatov leaves the battleship Imperator Nikolai I to meet Admiral Tōgō and surrender.

The Russian command sent a squadron of the Baltic Fleet under the command of Admiral Zinovy Rozhestvensky to help besieged Port Arthur around the Cape of Good Hope across the Atlantic, Indian and Pacific Oceans. However, the fleet arrived too late to relieve Port Arthur, whose garrison surrendered before the fleet arrived. On October 21, 1904, this fleet almost provoked a war with the British Empire (an ally of Japan, but a neutral state during this war) during the Dogger Bank incident, when the Russian fleet shelled British fishing vessels, mistaking them for Japanese destroyers. After a seven-month journey, the squadron was destroyed by the Japanese fleet at the Battle of Tsushima in May 1905 before reaching its objective, and thus ending the war with a Japanese victory.

== Reconstruction of the fleet: pre-World War era ==
The defeat at Tsushima in 1905 was the most crushing naval defeat in Russia's history and it would prove to have a lasting impact on the strategy of both the Imperial Navy and of the Soviet Navy that succeeded it. In the short-term, it generated an effort which sought to restore Russia's naval power and to correct the weaknesses that were perceived to have led to it.

Prior to the Russo-Japanese War, the Russian Navy in Far East had suffered from an absence of fleet-wide strategic and operational planning. It had also been deployed in a disjointed and dispersed fashion, thereby contributing to its vulnerability. Aidan Clarke argues that:

"Of all the weaknesses which the Imperial Russian Navy suffered from during the Russo-Japanese War, none were so glaring as the failings of the officer corps. These officers were generally more concerned with their own advancement rather than success in battle. Tellingly, they suffered from over-bureaucratization and a failure to encourage initiative among their ranks". Discontent in the fleet was high at the end of the war, contributing to mutinies in the Black Sea Fleet and elsewhere including most notably on the battleship Potemkin.

In the aftermath of the war, a series of reforms were therefore attempted, including the founding of naval general staff. The task of the naval general staff was approved and defined by Emperor Nicholas II as “the composition of a plan for war at sea and measures for the organization of the combat readiness of the maritime armed forces of the empire.”

In the immediate aftermath of the war the Russian navy was neglected, largely because the new Duma favored prioritization of the army. A large budget for the navy, including the funding of capital ships, was finally approved in 1912. Prior to that time, the focus remained on a largely defensive fleet including submarines and smaller vessels.^{[S. 31]}^{[S. 32]}

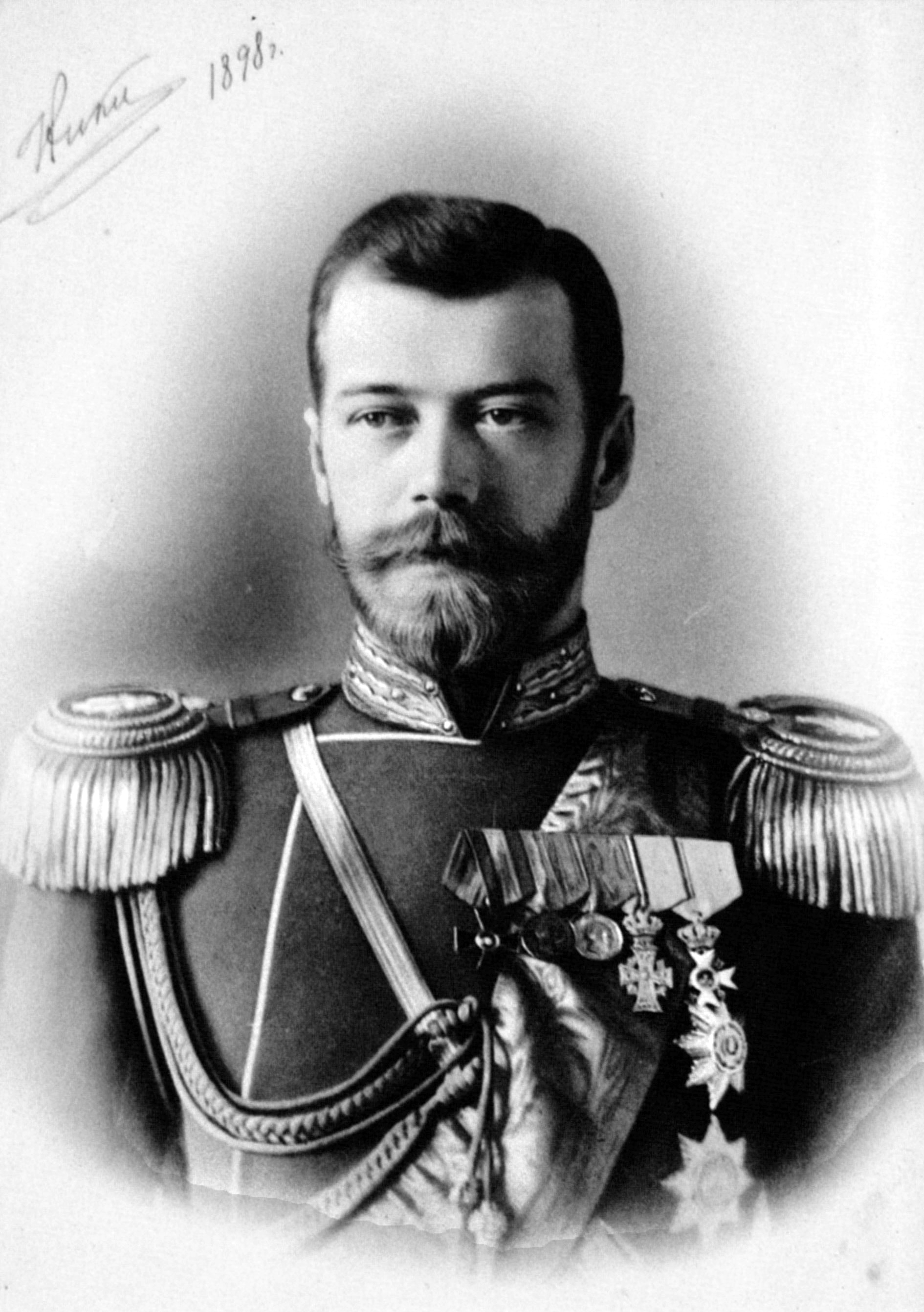
Tsar Nicholas II Emperor of Russia, 1894-1917

While the navy had managed to lay down four dreadnoughts for the Baltic Fleet in 1909, construction really began in earnest in 1912 with the Baltic Fleet as the central focus. This program, endorsed by navy minister Admiral Ivan Grigorovich, included four powerful 32,000-ton battlecruisers, four light cruisers, 36 destroyers and twelve submarines. The cost was more than four hundred million rubles over a five-year period. This was intended as the first phase of a twenty-year program envisaging thirty capital ships by 1930, in addition to fifteen battleships for the Black Sea.

In the end, these programs came too late to rejunviate the fleet and the Russian navy remained on the defensive in the Baltic for the duration of the First World War. However, the navy did benefit from a construction program that had been intiated in 1912 to establish powerful coastal defence batteries (that included twenty 14-inch, four 12-inch, eight 8-inch and a variety of other guns of lesser calibers). These guns, supplemented by the existing force of modernized predreadnought battleships, covered deep minefields that created a vast “mine-artillery position” (minno-artilleriiskaia pozitsiia) which was able to help contain the German naval threat until the Russian revolutions of 1917.

== World War I (1914-18) ==
=== Baltic Sea ===
At the start of the war in 1914, the Baltic Fleet consisted of five pre-dreadnoughts (plus four dreadnoughts being completed), six older armoured cruisers, four light (protected) cruisers and some destroyers, torpedo boats and a few small submarines. The Imperial German Navy, on the other hand, deployed 15 dreadnoughts, five battlecruisers and other modern ships. While these vessels were focused on the threat posed by the Royal Navy in the North Sea, the Germans had the ability to transfer vessels between the North Sea and the Baltic via the Kiel Canal, giving them naval superiority. While the Russian navy was generally weaker than its German opponent, Russian coastal fortifications and the use of sea mines were to play a major role in containing German offensive operations.

A large number of British submarines, initially six E-class boats deployed in 1914, sailed through the Kattegat Strait to support the Imperial Russian Navy against the German Navy.

The Russians were able to score a major success early in the war when the German light cruiser SMS Magdeburg ran aground on the island of Oldensholm off the Estonian coast on 25 August 1914. She had been conducting a sweep with other ships in the Gulf of Finland. Two Russian cruisers opened fire on the stranded ship, which was badly damaged and had to be abandoned by the Germans. Subsequently, Russian divers were able to recover German naval and merchant code books then in use, which also revealed the methods employed for constructing future codes. These were sent to British Admiralty cryptographers in London which allowed the British to decipher almost all of the German wireless traffic for the remainder of the war.

In August 1915, the German Navy transferred several units of the High Seas Fleet to the Baltic with the objective of destroying Russian naval forces in the Baltic and facilitating the capture of Riga from the Russians. In the ensuing Battle of the Gulf of Riga Russian naval units, including the Battleship Slava and supporting British E-class submarines, repelled the German attack.

The German Navy ultimately secured supremacy in the Baltic in the turmoil of the 1917 Revolutions in Russia. In October 1917, in Operation Albion, German naval forces were able to clear mines and neutralize Russian coastal artillery in the West Estonian Archipelago, thereby allowing German amphibious units to land and capture the islands.

=== Black Sea ===
On the Black Sea, the main opponent of Russia was the Turkish Ottoman Empire. Turkey entered the First World War on the side of the Central Powers in October 1914 with a major naval attack against Russia's Black Sea ports. Vessels of the Ottoman Navy were accompanied by the German battlecruiser SMS Goeben and the light cruiser SMS Breslau, ships of the Imperial German Navy that had been caught in the Mediterranean at the outbreak of war in August, but had taken refuge in Turkey. These ships had now been integrated into the Ottoman Navy, albeit with their German crews still on board. The plan for the surprise attack on Russia had been formulated by Turkish War Minister Enver Pasha together with the commander of the two German ships, Admiral Wilhelm Souchon, and with the full knowledge of the German government.

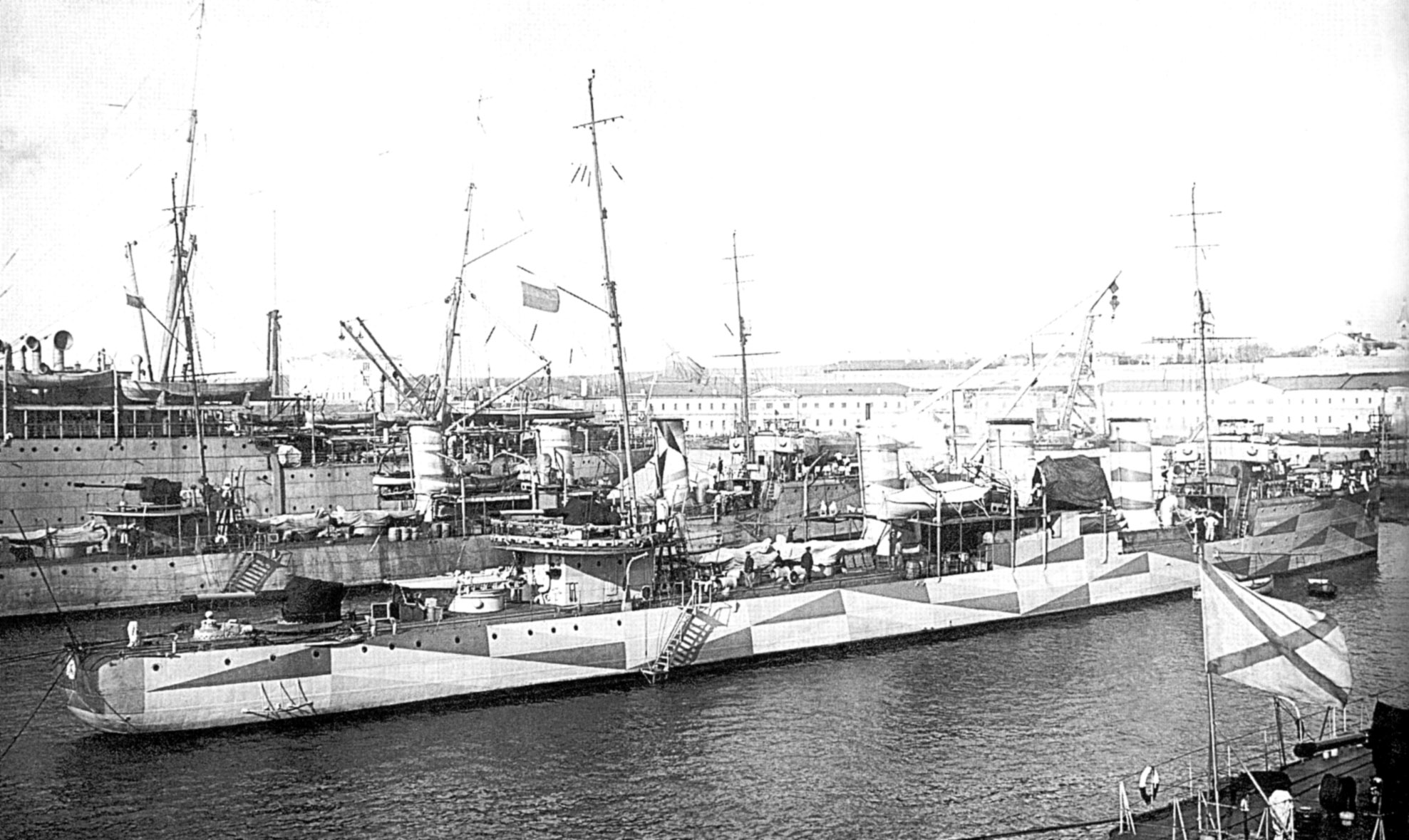
The Russian Black Sea Fleet in Sevastopol, c. 1916

While in the initial stages of the war, the Ottomans had the advantage due to the presence of the Goeben in Turkish waters, once two modern Russian dreadnoughts (Imperatritsa Mariya and Imperatritsa Ekaterina Velikaya) entered service with the Black Sea Fleet in 1915, the Russians gained the upper hand. The two sides would continue to trade surface raids, while German submarines of the Constantinople Flotilla and Turkish light forces raided and harassed Russian shipping.

The Black Sea Fleet was tasked to support General Nikolai Yudenich's Caucasian Army. In the summer of 1916, the Ottoman Army under the command of Vehip Pasha made an attempt to retake the city of Trabzon from the Russians. The Turks began to move along the coast in July, but the Black Sea Fleet, by its actions, managed to significantly slow down their progress through the shelling of infantry columns and their wagons. The Russian army launched a counter-offensive and defeated the advancing Turkish ground forces.

The Russian loss of the dreadnought Imperatritsa Maria in late 1916 constituted a serious blow to the Black Sea Fleet, while Romania's entry into the war in the same year had shifted the focus of the Fleet from supporting Russian operations in the eastern Black Sea to assisting in the effort of countering German and Austrian forces as they advanced on the western side of the Sea. Then, with the onset of the Russian Revolutions in 1917, the cohesion and effectiveness of the Black Sea Fleet began to collapse. The Treaty of Brest Litovsk brought an end to hostilities between the Central Powers and Russia in March 1918 with harsh terms for Russia.

== Russian Revolution and Civil War (1917-20) ==
=== Impact of the First and Second Russian Revolutions on the Navy ===
The Russian Navy was immediately impacted by the outbreak of the first Russian Revolution in February (March) 1917 through the revolt that occurred at the Kronstadt naval base where radical elements murdered Admiral Robert Viren and several other naval officers. Instability and mutiny then spread to the rest of the navy.

The Baltic Fleet, which had been inactive for much of 1916–17, was vulnerable to revolutionary agitation. The combination of inactivity, low pay, low morale, and deep hostilities between officers and the rank-and-file created an explosive environment. With the February Revolution, the Fleet revolted. In Helsingfors (Helsinki) the mutineers killed almost 50 officers and petty officers, including Fleet commander-in-chief admiral Adrian Nepenin and Rear Admiral Arkady Nebolsin.

As a result of a March 1917 decree by the Petrograd Soviet (Order No. 1) soldiers and sailors were theoretically instructed to obey their officers and the Russian Provisional Government, but only if their orders did not contradict the decrees of the Petrograd Soviet. Elected sailor committees were established throughout the fleet and numbered over 500 in the Baltic Fleet, 200 in port and shore Soviets and 150 in coastal defense soldier committees. The result was that the navy was rendered increasingly ineffective, a situation that was compounded with the second Russian Revolution in October (November) 1917.

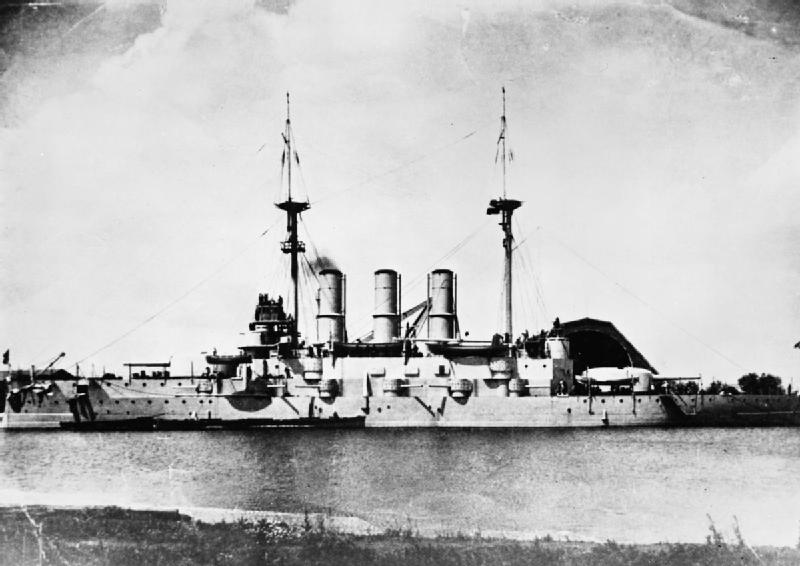
Russian battleship Potemkin, Black Sea Fleet

=== Foreign intervention in the Russian Civil War ===
In the Black Sea, the peace imposed on Bolshevik Russia by Germany in March 1918 meant that some elements of the Black Sea Fleet were interned by the Central Powers as they advanced into South Russia. In the April Crimea operation, the goal of both Ukrainians and Germans was to get control over the Black Sea Fleet, anchored in Sevastopol. Former Chief of Staff Mikhail Sablin raised the colours of the Ukrainian National Republic on 29 April 1918, and moved a portion of the Ukrainian fleet (two battleships and fourteen destroyers) to Novorossiysk in order to save it from capture by the Germans. Pursuant to the official acquiescence of Bolshevik authorities to the German demand that the fleet return to its base in Sevastopol, Soviet authorities nevertheless secretly ordered the fleet to scuttle its ships. However, the ultimate fate of each ship was effectively decided by their crews. As a result, while one battleship, one cruiser and six destroyers reportedly returned to Sevastopol, the rest were scuttled by their crews.

In 1919, following the collapse of the Central Powers' occupation in Western Russia, the Red Fleet of Ukraine was established out of certain remnants of the Russian Imperial Fleet. However, subsequently these elements were either scuttled or captured by the Western Allies. During the ensuing Russian Civil War, the chaotic political and strategic situation in southern Russia permitted the intervening Western allies to occupy Odessa, Sevastopol and other centres with relative ease.

Subsequently, most of the remaining ships of the Black Sea Fleet became part of the "Russian Squadron" of General Pyotr Wrangel's White forces in the south of Russia. Following the defeat of his anti-Bolshevik forces, and the evacuation of Crimea by his forces in 1920, the fleet itself sailed to Constantinople together with 126 ships of all types, carrying 150,000 refugees. Out of the former ships of the Black Sea Fleet, some passed to the French Navy while others were sold as scrap.

In the Baltic, British warships entered the region in force from late 1918, initially in order to assist Estonian nationalists fighting Red forces, but subsequently also to provide general support for White forces during the Civil War. The Royal Navy deployed 10 fast Coastal Motor Boats (CMBs), an aircraft carrier (converted from the cruiser HMS Vindictive), and HMS Erebus a monitor with 15-inch guns. Twenty British submarines operated as part of this fleet. In August 1919, the British launched an attack against Kronstadt and successfully torpedoed two Soviet battleships and the submarine depot ship Pamyat Azova. This attack rendered the Red Fleet incapable of interfering seriously with land operations by anti-Soviet forces and assisted in securing independence for Estonia and the other Baltic states in the immediate aftermath of the revolution in Russia.

The Royal Navy was similarly active in the Caspian Sea where it established a flotilla composed of local vessels and vessels that could be transported overland through Persia. By May 1919, with a victory at the Battle of Alexandrovsky Fort, the Royal Navy had succeeded in driving the Bolshevik Astrakhan-Caspian Military Flotilla from the Sea and up the Volga River. However, once the Civil War ended with victory for the Bolsheviks, Red forces re-established full control in the region.

In the Pacific region, the Bolsheviks did not establish full control until Japanese forces withdrew from Vladivostok in October 1922.

== Development of Navy (1920s to mid-1930s) ==
With the defeat of the anti-Bolshevik Armed Forces of South Russia in 1920, the Civil War was effectively won by Communist forces and the Soviet government took control of all naval elements. It also ensured that all elements of the new military would remain under the firm control of the party leadership. At Kronstadt, sailors who staged a rebellion in support of urban workers in Petrograd in 1921 were suppressed and many were shot. In strategic terms, the Baltic Fleet, having lost all of Russia's pre-war bases in Finland and the Baltic States, was confined to the ice-bound base at Kronstadt.

Soviet naval policy of the 1920s shifted from a pre-war emphasis on a traditional high-seas fleet of battleships and cruisers to a focus on submarines and other small units under the cover of land-based naval aircraft. In terms of larger units, the Red Fleet of the early 1920s only had four dreadnoughts (damaged) in the Baltic, four Borodino-class battlecruiser hulls (unfinished and never completed) and one dreadnought under construction in the Black Sea.

In the mid-1920s steps were taken to reform and modernize the Red Fleet. In June 1924 Mikhail Frunze was appointed Chairman of the Revolutionary Military Council and began to implement reforms related to the organization, training and hardware of the navy. The naval force was unified under a single head while a one-man command system gradually replaced the dual commander-commissar system of the revolutionary period.

During the 1930s, the fleet returned to what had been the pre-war emphasis of the Imperial Navy on large fleet units. As the industrialization of the Soviet Union proceeded, plans were made to expand the navy into one of the most powerful in the world. Approved by the Labour and Defence Council in 1926, the Naval Shipbuilding Program included plans to construct twelve submarines; the first six were to become known as the Dekabrist class. Beginning 4 November 1926, Technical Bureau Nº 4 (formerly the Submarine Department, and still secret), under the leadership of B.M. Malinin, managed the submarine construction works at the Baltic Shipyard.

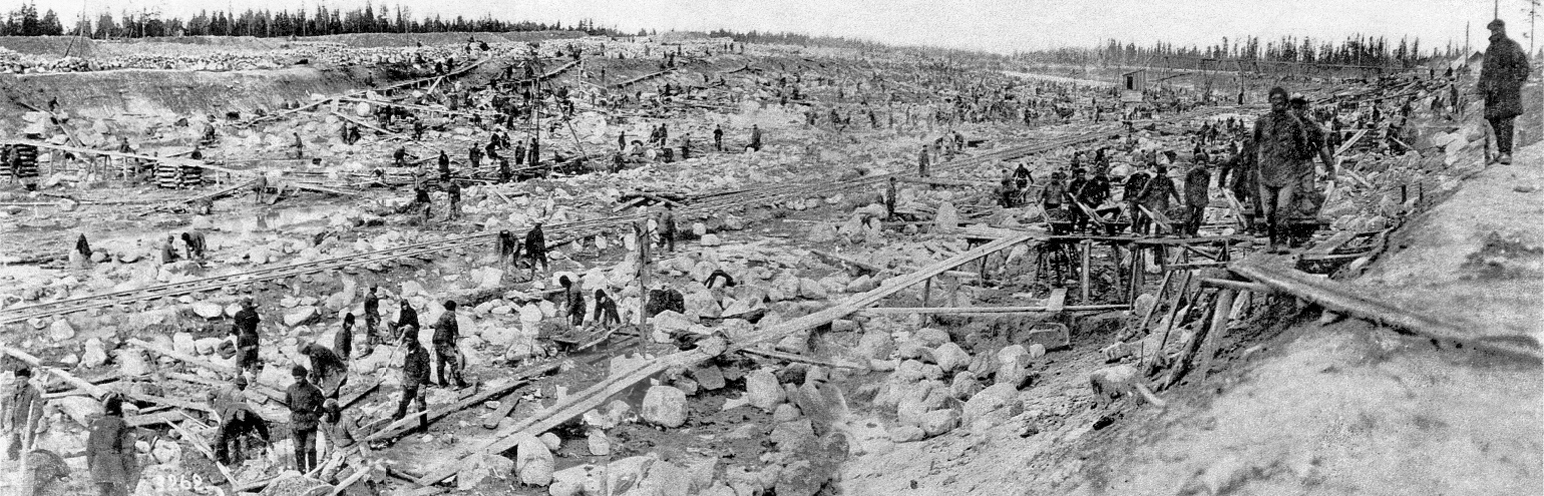
Forced labour work on White Sea Canal between Lake Ladoga and the White Sea

In subsequent years, 133 submarines were built to designs developed during Malinin's management. Additional developments included the formation of the Pacific Fleet in 1932 and the Northern Fleet in 1933. The forces were to be built around a core of powerful Sovetsky Soyuz-class battleships. New shipyards were also built in the Arctic (notably at Molotovsk - renamed Severodvinsk after 1957), in the Far East and in the interior at important industrial centers that could be reached by canal from the open sea. This construction involved an estimated 120,000 slave laborers at Molotovsk alone. Nevertheless, the building program was only in its initial stages by the time the German invasion forced its suspension in 1941. Most of the envisaged large ship construction programs were never completed.

== The Navy in the pre-war years (1937–1941) ==
Like all elements in Soviet society, the navy was decimated by the Stalin purges of the 1930s. At least 30 percent of the Red Army and Navy officer corps, including three of the four fleet commanders, were arrested and shot or sent to the gulags. These included two commanders of the Pacific Fleet, (Admirals Mikhail Viktorov and Grigory Kireyev) who were shot in succession, Konstantin Dushenov, commander of the Northern Fleet, as well as a number of current and former commanders of the Black Sea Fleet. The purges are said to have "had a catastrophic effect on the Red Army’s ability to perform in the early stages of World War II".

On December 30, 1937, the Navy of the Red Army was singled out into a separate service of the armed forces – the USSR Navy. On January 1, 1938, the surface composition of the navy was small – 3 battleships, 3 cruisers, 1 leader and 17 destroyers. But the submarine fleet was a formidable force: 10 large submarines, 10 submarine minelayers, 78 medium submarines and 52 small submarines. However, on the whole the modernity of the fleet was limited. In 1940 only one cruiser (Molotov) was radar-equipped and hydroacoustic submarine detection equipment was only deployed on the first Soviet ships in that year.

Joseph Stalin (led the USSR from 1924 to 1953) hoped for assistance from either Nazi Germany or the United States in developing blue-water naval capabilities which, by 1936, were planned to be massive. Plans continued to grow and in 1939, the so-called "Big Fleet Program" envisaged a navy of 699 ships totalling over 2.5 million tons plus hundreds of auxiliary vessels totaling another half a million tons. According to analysis by Milan Hauner:

"The reborn Pacific Fleet was to account for almost 40 percent of this inventory, in order to be capable of defeating the Japanese on the open sea, to destroy their home bases and fisheries, occupy the Kurils, and disrupt Japan’s sea communications. The Baltic Fleet was expected to sink not only all German warships but also the Polish, Swedish, and Finnish fleets, as well as the three small Baltic republics. Soviet submarines were expected to sink 120,000 tons of German shipping monthly. The Black Sea Fleet was to sink the naval forces of Italy, Romania, Bulgaria, and Turkey. As for the Northern Fleet, its task was to prevent Germany from landing troops in the Arctic and to disrupt communications in the North Atlantic".

After the Molotov–Ribbentrop Pact of August 1939, the Nazi government gave the USSR naval plans and equipment including designs for the Bismarck-class battleship and the completed German cruiser Lützow, in exchange for allowing the Kriegsmarine to use Soviet ports and naval facilities in the Arctic Ocean. Adolf Hitler did this because he calculated that naval warfare would play little role in his planned invasion of the Soviet Union. Few of the overly ambitious plans for the navy were ever realized, even though after World War II Stalin would resume planning for a large blue water fleet.

=== Winter War 1939-40 and diplomatic developments ===
In November 1939 Finland, which had refused to sign a "pact of mutual assistance" as demanded by Stalin, was attacked by the USSR. The fleet played a limited role in the Winter War with Finland in 1939–1940, mostly through conducting artillery bombardments of Finnish coastal fortifications. Many fleet aircraft were involved in operations against Finland, however. However, the Baltic Fleet's planned operations in 1939 to seize the islands of Suursaari, Lavansaari, Tytärsaari and Seiskari, and to destroy Finnish coastal fortifications, were stymied by Finnish resistance. In 1940, the fleet played a supporting role in the reinvigorated and broader Soviet offensive. Subsequently, the Baltic Fleet also supported the Soviet invasion of the Baltic states in the summer of 1940.

The navy's ability to fulfill the objectives of Soviet leaders had been limited during the Spanish Civil War (1936–39) where the fleet had been hard pressed even to protect the shipment of supplies to Republican forces, with a few Soviet merchant ships being sunk or captured. Nevertheless, diplomatically, the Soviet Union did secure recognition for some of its aspirations through the Montreaux Convention of 1936 (which secured peacetime access for Soviet ships through the Turkish Straits) and the Anglo-Soviet naval agreement of 1937.

== Red Fleet during World War II (1941-45) ==
On April 29, 1939, Nikolai Kuznetsov, 35, was appointed People's Commissar of the Navy. Kuznetsov's appointment at such a young age occurred in the context of the Stalin purges in which 3,000 officers had been shot, imprisoned or dismissed. Prior to his appointment, between August 1937 and March 1939 four successive navy chiefs and the commanders of all four fleets were executed. As noted by former Soviet naval officer Nicholas Shadrin, under the Stalinist structure, most “decisions of even minor importance were referred back to Moscow”. Admiral Kuznetsov himself was later to comment: "The navy was allowed under an unwritten rule to decide any important matters only after consultation with him (i.e. Stalin), although Molotov and Zhadanov were sometimes authorized to prepare naval decisions before they were examined by Stalin". Nevertheless, Kuznestov demonstrated a degree of initiative that, while personally dangerous, ultimately stood him in good stead once war with Germany erupted in 1941.

On June 19, without referring the matter to Stalin, Admiral Kuznetsov put the Soviet Navy in "Readiness state 2" and on June 21 in "Readiness state 1". While the navy was not a primary objective of the Luftwaffe in the initial stages of the war (focusing instead on the Red army and air force), these alert orders still contributed to the fact that, despite German air attacks on Sevastopol (headquarters of the Black Sea Fleet) and Baltic Fleet bases on the first day of war, the navy experienced no ship losses in the initial German blitzkrieg of 22 June.

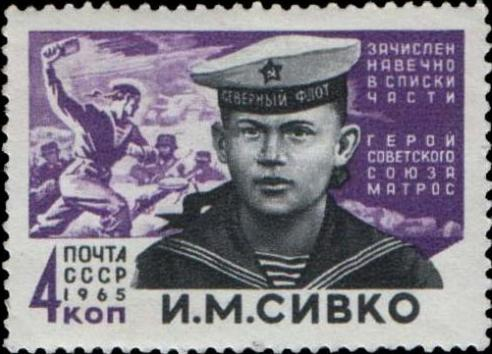
Soviet Union 1965 stamp related to Hero Of World War II

Geography was to play a major role in both restricting and shaping Soviet naval strategy during World War II. As Vincent O’Hara and Stephen McLaughlin have argued:

"It is ironic that the largest country on earth should have such constricted access to the high seas. The Soviet Union had just four narrow windows on the world ocean: the Baltic Sea, the Black Sea, the Sea of Japan, and its own Arctic coast. The first three all passed through choke points that were controlled by hostile powers, while the Arctic coast had only one ice-free port that was a thousand kilometers from Leningrad by railroad".

The navy also struggled with the impact of the earlier Stalin purges on the professionalism of the fleet, poor training, lack of modern vessels and the relentless nature of the German advance into the Soviet Union in 1941. However, over the course of the war it remained persistent and improvised complex operations, absorbed high casualties and thus, by particularly in the latter stages of the war, often succeeded. In this regard, it has been described as having preserved both Leningrad and Murmansk from the initial German advance.

In the Black Sea region, despite the scale of the German/Axis advance in southern Russia, and the capture of Crimea by Axis forces in mid-1942, the Black Sea Fleet, though badly mauled, gave a creditable account of itself as it fought alongside the Red Army during the Siege of Odessa and the Battle of Sevastopol.

In the Baltic, the navy was very vulnerable to attacks by the Luftwaffe, particularly as German forces advanced toward Leningrad in the summer of 1941. So great was German naval superiority that in 1942, the Germans moved 400,000 soldiers, 1,900 ships and 5.6 million GRT through the Baltic virtually unopposed. As ships were destroyed or immobilized, by early 1942 many sailors of the Baltic Fleet were transferred to the infantry to make up for ground forces shortages. Even as late as 1944–45, the German Navy still enjoyed superiority at sea. Nevertheless, by January 1944 the navy was strong enough to secretly transport 30,000 troops to the bridgehead at Oranienbaum and break the siege of Leningrad.

The fate of the Second World War and the Great Patriotic War was decided on the land front, so the fleet plans and its actions were often subordinate to the interests of the ground forces in the maritime sectors. During the war years, the USSR Navy deployed over 400 thousand people to land fronts.

== Soviet Navy during the Cold War ==
In February 1946, the Red Fleet was renamed and became known as the Soviet Navy (Russian: Советский Военно-Морской Флот, romanized: Sovyetsky Voyenno-Morskoy Flot, lit. 'Soviet Military Maritime Fleet'). After the war, the Soviets concluded that they needed a navy that could disrupt supply lines, and display a small naval presence to the developing world. As the natural resources the Soviet Union needed were available on the Eurasian landmass, it did not need a navy to protect a large commercial fleet, as the western navies were configured to do. Later, countering seaborne nuclear delivery systems became another significant objective of the navy, and an impetus for expansion.

Therefore, initially in the Cold War period, Soviet Navy was structured in a defensive posture emphasizing submarines and small, maneuverable, tactical vessels. The Soviet shipbuilding program kept yards busy constructing submarines based upon World War II German Kriegsmarine designs, which were launched with great frequency during the immediate post-war years.

The Cuban Missile Crisis of 1962 exposed some of the weaknesses of this posture as the Soviet Navy found that their blue water capability was too limited to enable them to escort their ships through the quarantine area imposed by the US Navy. Their resulting over reliance on diesel-electric submarines with limited capability put them at a decided disadvantage, with some reports suggesting that the commander of Soviet submarine B-59 considered the use of nuclear torpedoes when he, wrongly, initially believed his vessel to be under attack by American forces.

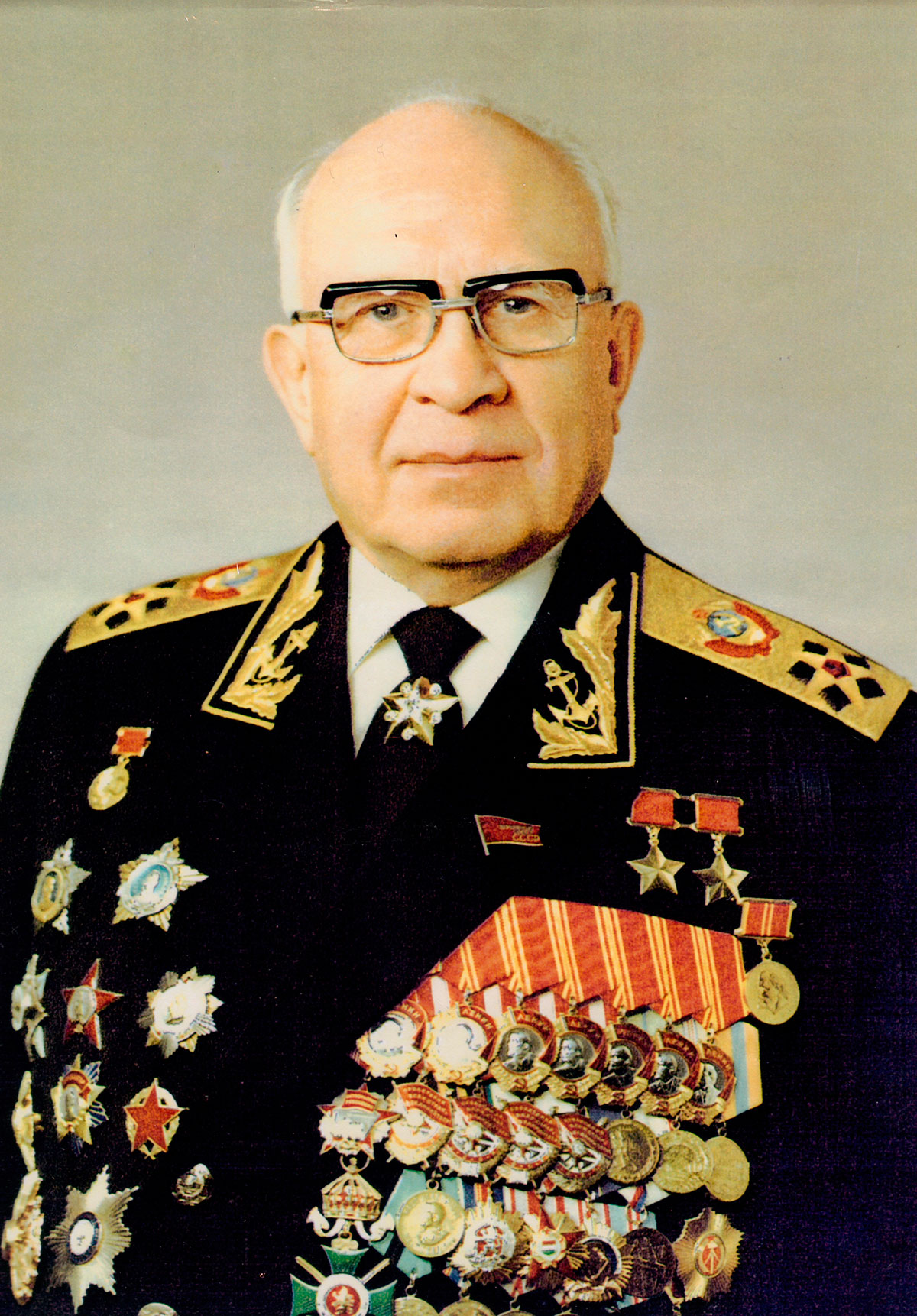
Admiral of the fleet of the Soviet Union Sergey Gorshkov

Through the long tenure (1956 to 1985) of Sergei Gorshkov as commander of the navy, the USSR attempted to rectify this perceived weakness and Soviet sea power expanded to incorporate a global presence and posture. The Soviet Navy, Gorshkov believed, had an especially important role in supporting the Soviet Union's political objectives and exerting its influence abroad. In that sense his thinking paralleled that of the American naval strategist Alfred Thayer Mahan that national greatness was inextricably linked to the sea.

During the 1973 Yom Kippur War, and in contrast to limitations which had existed on it at the time of the Cuban Missile Crisis, the Soviet Navy played a much more active role in the provision of support to both Syria and Egypt in that war. The Soviet Navy deployed more than 50 surface warships and submarines in the Mediterranean during the crisis and threats by the USSR to intervene in the conflict led the United States to raise the alert status of its nuclear forces to DEFCON 3. Naval activities by the Soviet Navy's 5th Operational Squadron in the Mediterranean included intensive anti-carrier exercises thus raising the potential danger for the US 6th Fleet. Nevertheless conflict was averted when the Soviet leadership lifted its intervention threat following the raising of the US nuclear alert level.

Global Soviet naval activity continued to increase in the 1970s and 1980s with the navy supporting the military interventions by Soviet Bloc forces in both the Angolan Civil War (after 1975) and in the Ethiopian Civil War (from the latter 1970s).

During the 1979 Sino-Vietnam border war, the Pacific Fleet deployed a task force of ships and submarines to the South China Sea. The deployment, designed to support Vietnam and deter potentially more aggressive Chinese action, was complemented by a similarly extensive presence of Soviet vessels in the Indian Ocean, and was consistent with Admiral Gorshkov's objectives to extend “Soviet military, political and economic influence throughout the world.”

Under Gorshkov, the Soviets emphasized the construction of missile ships for their surface fleet. Indeed, it became a feature of Soviet design to place large missiles onto relatively small, but fast, missile boats, while in the West such an approach would never have been considered tactically feasible. The Soviet Navy also developed several very large and well-armed guided-missile cruisers, like those of the Kirov and Slava classes. It also started integrating larger Kiev-class aircraft-carrying cruisers into the fleet. By the 1970s, Soviet submarine technology was in some respects more advanced than in the West, and several of their submarines were considered superior to their American rivals.

In 1984, the Soviet Navy was reported to be operating approximately 2,400 ships and craft. While the majority of these consisted of "noncombatant auxiliaries and coastal or inshore vessels", the principal warfighting elements nevertheless included 289 major surface combatants and 380 submarines. These capabilities made it a significant rival to the United States Navy.

== Russian Navy after dissolution of the Soviet Union ==
With the internal collapse of the Soviet Union in 1991, the Navy of the Russian Federation succeeded the former Soviet Navy, retaining most of its ships, particularly in the Baltic, Pacific and Arctic regions.

The Soviet Navy's Black Sea Fleet was divided between Russia and the newly independent state of Ukraine. In 1995, presidents Leonid Kuchma of Ukraine and Boris Yeltsin of Russia negotiated terms for dividing the fleet, and to ease the tensions, on 10 June 1995 the two governments signed an interim treaty, establishing a joint Russo-Ukrainian Black Sea Fleet under joint command (and Soviet Navy flag) until a full-scale partition agreement could be reached. Formally, the Fleet's Commander was to be appointed by a joint order of the two countries' presidents. However, Russia still dominated the Fleet unofficially, and a Russian admiral was appointed as Commander; the majority of the fleet personnel adopted Russian citizenship. The nature of the fleet's division would serve to contribute to the growing conflict between Russia and Ukraine after 2000.

By the end of the 1990s, the Russian Navy was a shell of its former self with some ships having little capability. The navy suffered severely due to insufficient maintenance, lack of funding, and subsequent effects on the training of personnel and timely replacement of equipment. Ships continued flying an ensign so that crews are entitled to be paid. As Jane's Fighting Ships reported in 2010: "There are large numbers of most classes 'in reserve', and flying an ensign so that skeleton crews may still be paid. [Their listing reflected] only those units assessed as having some realistic operational capability or some prospect of returning to service after refit.".

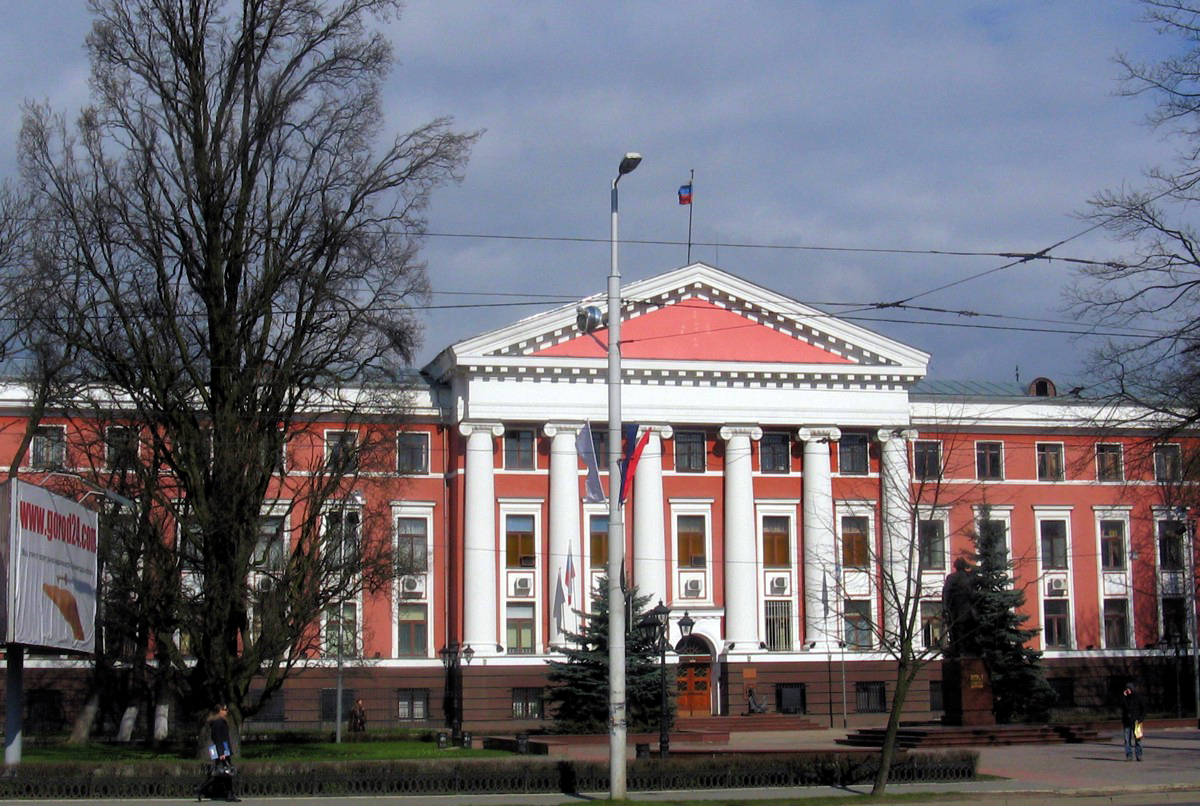
Baltic Fleet headquarters in Kaliningrad

From the early 2000s, there was a concerted effort to modernize and update the fleet. In 2013, a rise in gas and oil prices enabled a sort of renaissance of the Russian Navy due to increased available funds, which may have allowed Russia to begin "developing the capacity to modernize". A trend to replace older vessels has continued, with a particular emphasis placed on the submarine component of Russia's nuclear deterrent forces.

Since the start of the full Russian invasion of Ukraine in 2022 in the Russo-Ukraine War, the Black Sea Fleet has experienced serious losses in ships and materiel.

=== Abortive shipbuilding proposals ===
From 2008, there have been several reports that the Russian Government wanted to procure new aircraft carriers. In 2008, then Russian President Dmitriy Medvedev stated that Russia intended to build nuclear aircraft carriers in the next decade. On 2 August 2010 Admiral Vladimir Vysotskiy stressed their importance: "If, for example, we do not have an aircraft carrier in the North, the combat capability of the Northern Fleet's guided-missile submarines will be reduced to zero after Day One because the submarines' principal adversary is aviation." In February 2015, Russian media said that the Krylov State Research Center in St. Petersburg was on its way towards developing another aircraft carrier. There was no announcement of what shipyard would be able to build the carrier. One super-carrier project has been code-named Project 23000 or "Shtorm".

In December 2021, a First Vice-chairman of Military-Industrial Commission of Russia Andrey Yelchaninov stated in an interview that the construction of a new aircraft carrier was being considered for the new State Armament Program for 2024–2033. In the new naval doctrine approved on 31 July 2022, the development of new modern shipbuilding facilities in the Far East was mentioned, particularly for the construction of large vessels such as aircraft carriers. Then, in an interview on 15 August 2022, the head of United Shipbuilding Corporation Alexei Rakhmanov stated that the company was ready to build any large warship, including aircraft carriers, after the modernisation of Severnaya Verf is completed. He also confirmed that if the construction of a new aircraft carrier is approved, the majority of the work will be done at Severnaya Verf.

However, none of these initiatives have advanced and with Russia's 2024 decision to seemingly remove its sole existing aircraft carrier from service, it was unclear what role aircraft carriers would have in the future Russian navy.

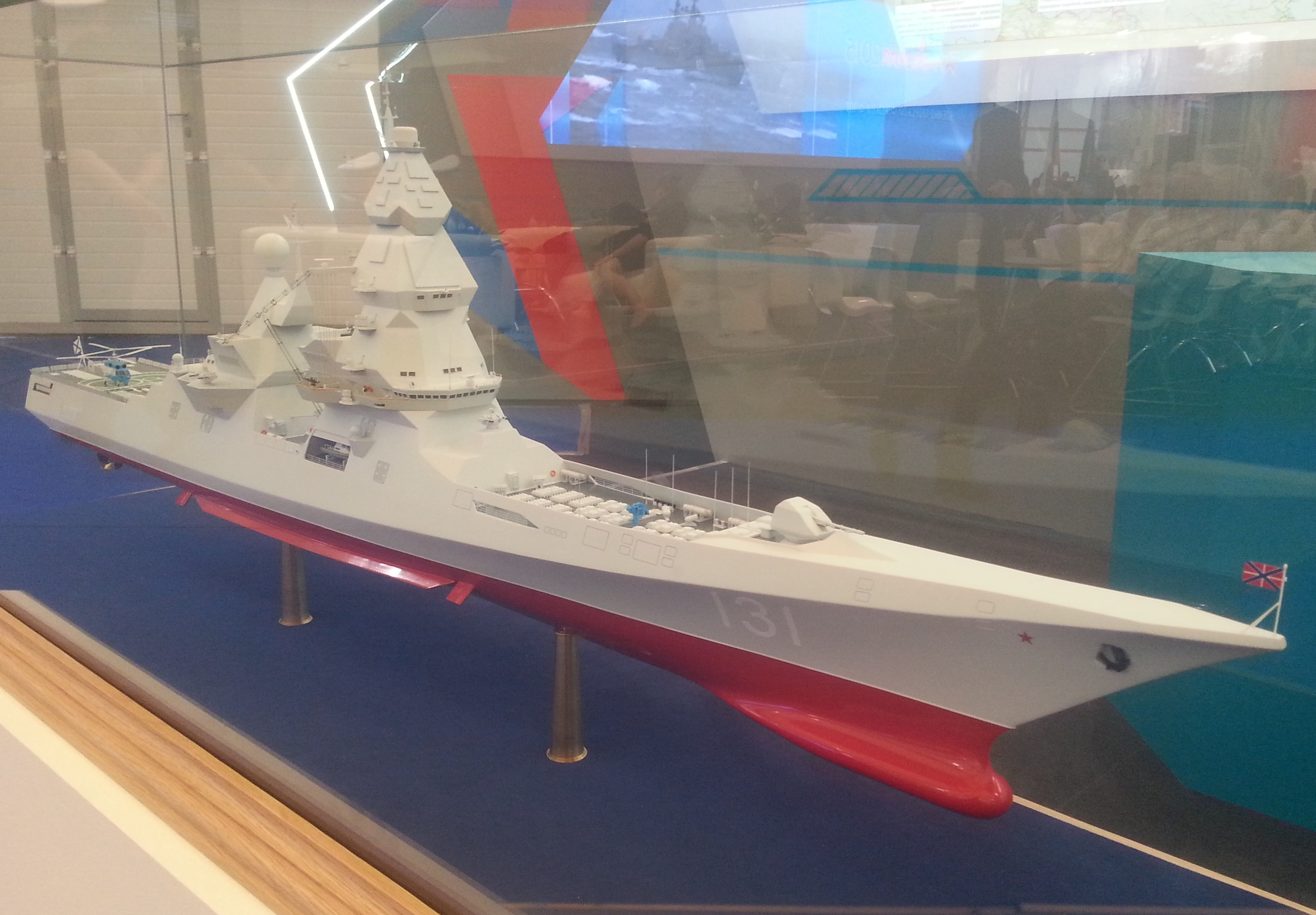
A model of Project 23560 destroyer in 2017

In 2014 it was reported that the specification had been signed off for a new anti-air destroyer. Twelve ships of the 19,000 tonne Project 23560 Lider-class destroyer class were planned to enter service, split between the Northern and Pacific Fleets. Undecided whether the ships would use nuclear or conventional power but they will carry the ABM-capable S-500 SAM and Kalibr (SS-N-30) and SS-N-27 cruise missiles. The Lider-class destroyer concept is a project of JSC Severnoye. In May 2015, Jane's reported that the Krylov State Research Center has also developed the Project 23560 destroyer design concept.

Initial reporting said that these ships would enter service in 2023–2025. In January 2018 however it was reported that detailed design phase will start after 2020 and construction in 2025. On 18 April 2020 Russian newspaper Interfax reported that the Severnoye Design Bureau had suspended development on the Lider. However, in June Alexei Rakhmanov, head of the United Shipbuilding Corporation, said that the Lider project was still moving forward.

In an interview on 15 August 2022, the head of United Shipbuilding Corporation Alexei Rakhmanov stated that the Lider-class destroyer project has not been abandoned, however, he also stated that the Russian Ministry of Defence will only approve one project for large ocean-going warships. The Russian MoD currently favours the Project 22350M Super-Gorshkov frigate, and therefore it is unlikely that the Lider-class destroyer project will be approved for construction. However, in mid-2025 Admiral Alexander Moiseev, the commander-in-chief of the Navy, stated that project remained under development. As of 2026, the Russian Navy is not building any destroyer class.

=== 2022–23 invasion of Ukraine ===
In 2022 the Russian Navy took part in the invasion of Ukraine, starting with the attack on Snake Island at the beginning of the war. The siege became infamous when the Ukrainian defenders told the Russian cruiser Moskva, flagship of the Black Sea; "Russian warship, go fuck yourself". Moskva sunk on 14 April 2022 after a fire broke out and forced the crew to evacuate. The Ukrainian military reported that they hit the ship with R-360 Neptune anti-ship missiles. The ship subsequently capsized and sank while the Russian Navy was attempting to tow her into port. The sinking of Moskva is the most significant Russian naval loss in action since World War II. Moskva is almost certainly the largest warship to be sunk in action since World War II. The last time a warship of similar size was sunk was the slightly smaller Argentine cruiser ARA General Belgrano, which was sunk by the British Royal Navy in 1982 during the Falklands War. Moskva was the largest Soviet or Russian ship to be sunk by enemy action since German aircraft bombed the Soviet battleship Marat in 1941, and the first loss of a Russian flagship in wartime since the 1905 sinking of the battleship Knyaz Suvorov during the Battle of Tsushima in the Russo-Japanese War. Moskva is the largest warship ever disabled or destroyed by a missile, according to Carl Schuster, a retired US Navy captain and former director of operations at the US Pacific Command's Joint Intelligence Center.

=== War in the Black Sea ===
While precise information on Russian ship losses in the Russo-Ukraine War are not available, the fleet has lost at least four major warships (with others damaged), three major amphibious ships (with others damaged) and one submarine (Rostov-na-Donu), which was either seriously damaged or possibly destroyed while in dry dock. The fleet has continued to operate and attempted to adjust to Ukrainian tactics by integrating new defensive systems in ships and by redeploying vessels to the eastern Black Sea, or out of the region entirely, until sufficiently upgraded. However, by early 2026 it was reported that, despite no longer having a navy, Ukraine's surface, sub-surface and aerial drone capabilities had effectively driven the Russian fleet from open waters, forcing it to seek shelter in ports on the eastern Black Sea that themselves were no longer fully secure.

== See also ==
- Russian Navy
- Imperial Russian Navy
- Soviet Navy
