= Charles Napier =

Charles Napier may refer to:

- Sir Charles James Napier (1782–1853), British general
- Sir Charles Napier (Royal Navy officer) (1786–1860), Royal Navy admiral
- Charles Elers Napier (1812–1847), Royal Navy officer, stepson of the above
- Charles Ottley Groom Napier (1839–1894), British writer and impostor
- Charles Napier (RAF officer) (1892–1918), British World War I flying ace
- Charles Scott Napier (1899–1946), British general
- Charlie Napier (1910–1973), Scottish footballer
- Charles Napier (actor) (1936–2011), American actor
- Charles Napier, former treasurer of the Paedophile Information Exchange
- Sir Charles Napier Inn, an early 19th-century pub in Chinnor, Oxfordshire, England, named after the 19th-century general
