= 1734 in Russia =

Events from the year 1734 in Russia

== Incumbents ==
- Monarch – Anna

== Event ==
- Siege of Danzig (1734)

== Birth ==
- Stepan Rumovsky, Russian astronomer
- Mikhail Kakhovsky, Russian general
- Grigory Orlov, Russian noble
- Nikolai Vasilyevich Repnin, Russian statesman

== Death ==
- Johann Euler, Swiss-Russian mathematician
- Gavriil Golovkin, Russian statesman
