= Charles Ottley Groom =

English natural history collector, writer, and fraudster

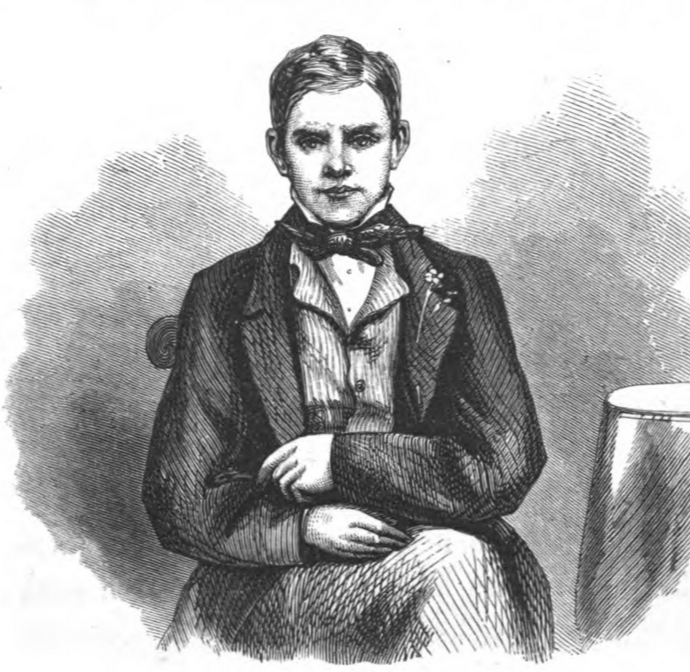
"Tommy Try" at 16, possibly a portrait of Groom

Charles Ottley Groom, Charles Ottley Groom Napier, also self-styled Charles de Bourbon d'Este Paleologus Gonzaga, Prince of Mantua and Montferrat (14 May 1839 – 17 January 1894), was an English natural history collector, writer, best known however as an impostor, charlatan, and fraud. Aside from claiming a royal lineage, he attempted to rise in social standing by awarding a so-called "Mantua Medal" to noted artists, writers, and scientists of his time.

== Biography ==
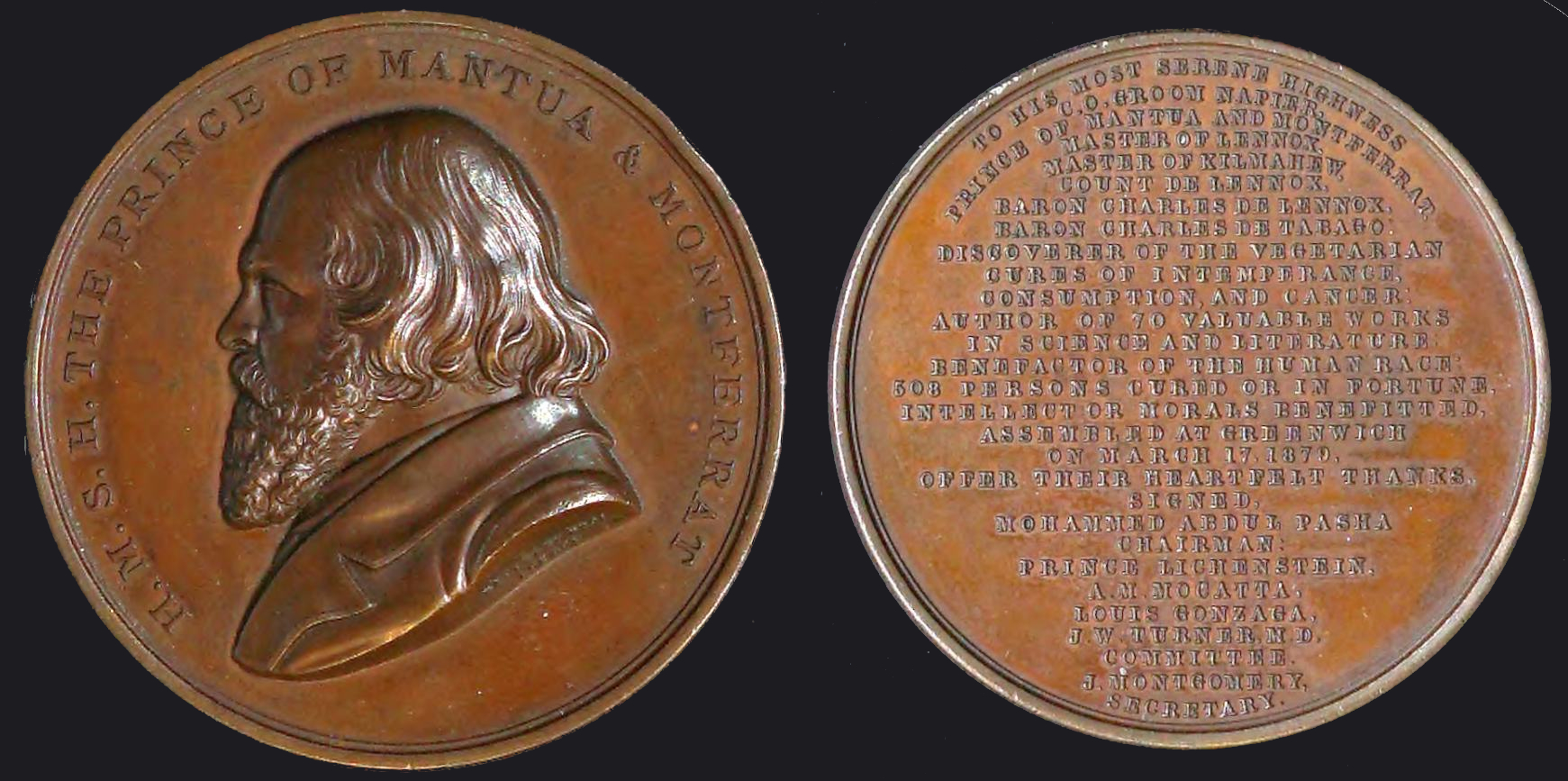
A "Mantua Medal" awarded to Groom himself on March 17, 1870. Later versions were gilded bronze.

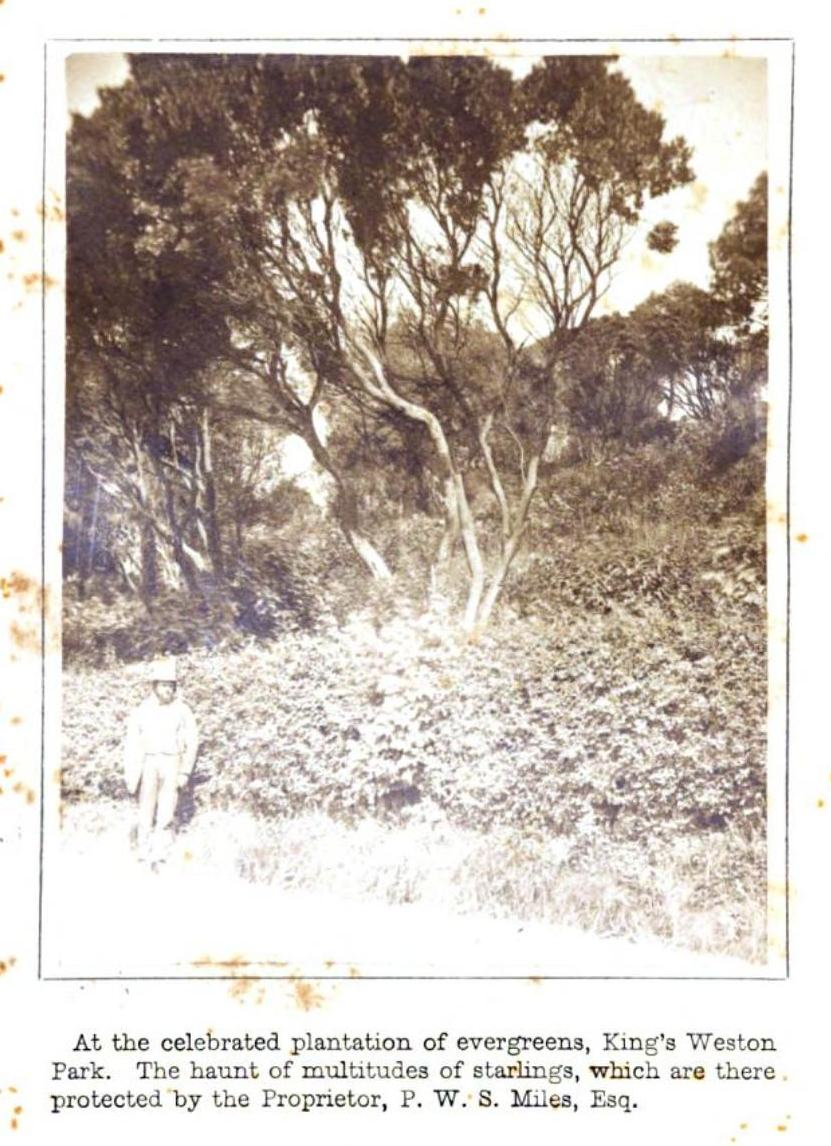
Charles Groom around 1865

Groom was born in Merchiston, Tobago to sugar planter Charles Edward Groom (1815–1838) and Ann née Napier (1815–1895). He grew up, raised alone by his mother in Sussex and was of delicate health. He spent a lot of time in natural history and science. Among his early books was The Food, Use, and Beauty of British Birds (1865). In 1869 he wrote an autobiographical book Tommy Try, or, What he did in Science (1869). He edited a chapter on conchology in a book by Louis Figuier. He promoted vegetarianism at meetings of the British Association. His book Lakes and Rivers (1879) was published by the Society for Promoting Christian Knowledge. In 1865 he changed his surname to Napier, sometimes giving his name as C.O.G. Napier of Merchiston. Still later he claimed to have traced his lineage back to King David of Israel and styled himself as the Prince of Mantua and Montferrat and gave himself and his mother the surname of Gonzaga. He threw a banquet for 7000 guests in 1879 with illuminated vellum leaves of his pedigree decorating the venue. The food was strictly vegetarian and claiming to be unwell, he did not appear in person. To promote himself further he established or claimed to revive a medal instituted in the 14th century and claimed that his ancestor had awarded numerous famous artists, writers, and scientists including Raphael, Dante, Shakespeare, and Galileo. Ruskin, Tennyson, and Sir Richard Owen were duped into receiving the medal while Gladstone and Huxley refused to accept it. He claimed in 1883 that his ancestor the Duke of Mantua and Montferrat had left £750,000 for educational purposes. He read out a purported letter of thanks written by Dante on receiving a medal from his ancestor. In 1886 he claimed that his The Book of Nature and the Book of Man (1870) had converted Victor Hugo at his deathbed to Christianity.

Through misrepresentation, he had become a director of the City of Genoa Waterworks company and was sued by some of the stockholders. He settled one suit in 1888 but another suit in 1889 for £1016 led him to declare bankruptcy. It is claimed that he tried to kill mineralogist Thomas Davies (1837 - 1892) by dropping a rock on him. He died of a heart condition at his home in 18 Elgin Avenue, Maida Vale. His mother, suffering from cancer, who then went by the name of Gonzaga registered the death under Charles de Bourbon d'Este Paleologus Gonzaga, prince of Mantua and Montferrat.

Groom was a collector of minerals, plants, and fossils. He was elected Fellow of the Geological Society on 24 May 1865 but resigned in 1878. He sold 600 prints to the British Museum.

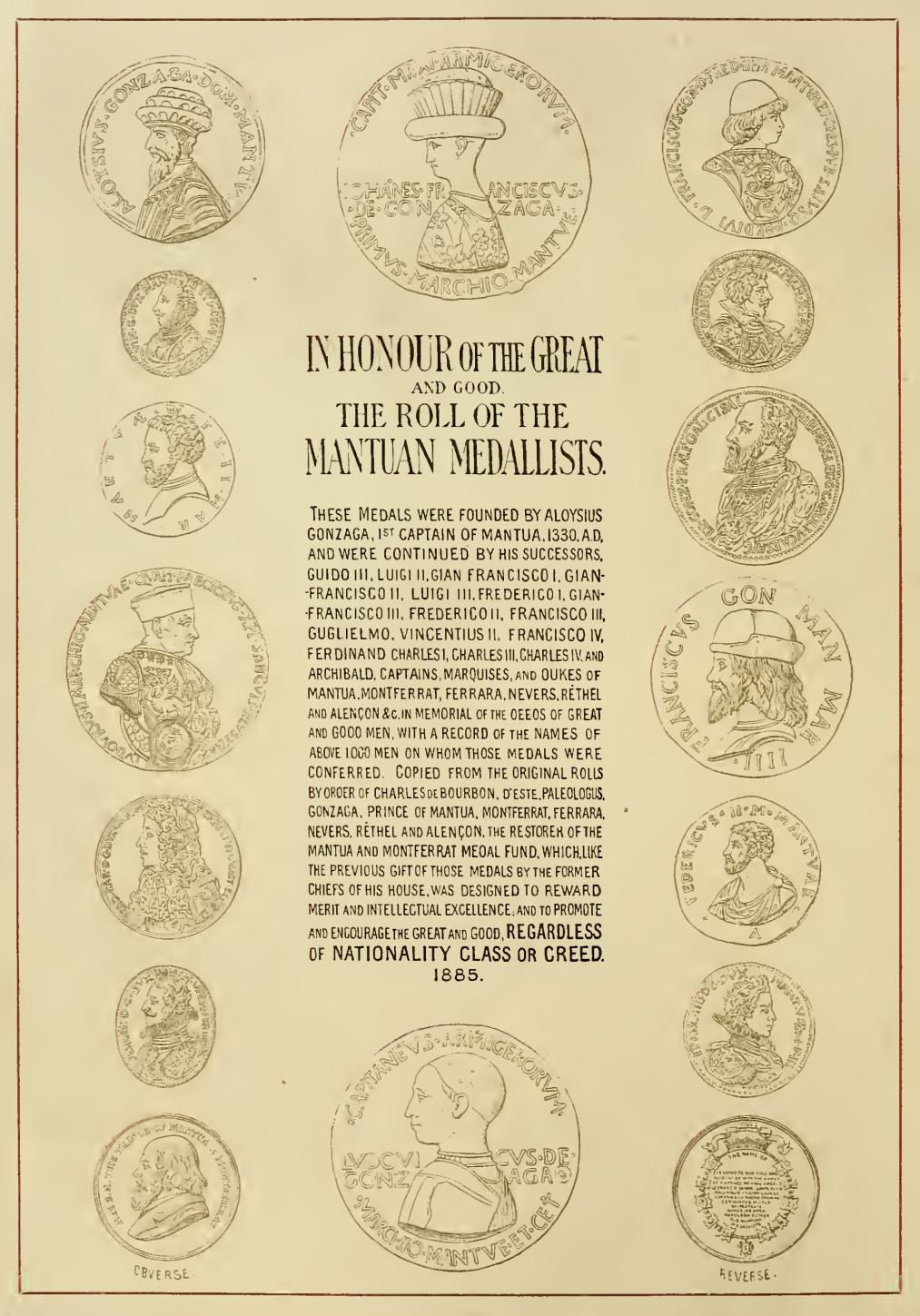
Alleged history of the Mantua medal
