= Project 23560 Lider-class destroyer =

Russian nuclear-powered destroyer

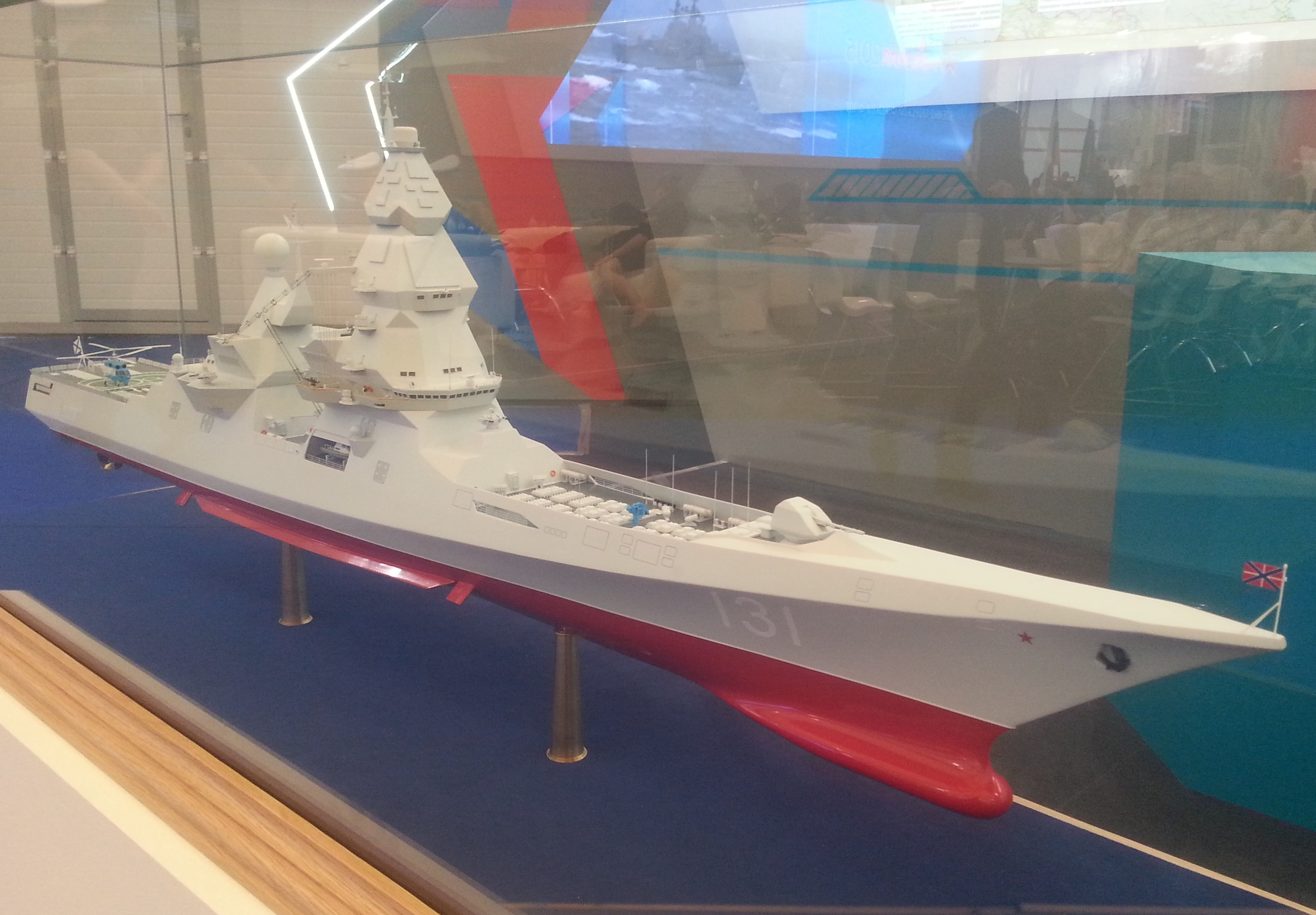
- A model of Project 23560 destroyer at the «ARMY-2017» military-technical forum.

Class overview
- Name: Lider class
- Builders: Severnaya Verf, Saint Petersburg Designed by Severnoye Design Bureau, Krylov State Research Center
- Operators: Russian Navy
- Preceded by: Sovremenny class; Slava class; Udaloy class; Kirov class
- Cost: RUB100 billion

General characteristics
- Type: Guided-missile destroyer/cruiser
- Displacement: 19,000 tons
- Length: 230 m (754 ft 7 in)
- Beam: 20 m (65 ft 7 in)
- Draught: 6.6 m (21 ft 8 in)
- Installed power: Nuclear reactor
- Speed: 32 knots (59 km/h)
- Range: unlimited
- Armament: Anti-ship and cruise missiles (64 3S14 universal VLS cells): 3M54 Kalibr; 3M22 Zircon; P-800 Oniks; Surface-to-air missiles: S-500 (56 cells); Redut (16 cells); 3 × Pantsir-M SAM/gun systems; Guns: 1 × 1 × A-192M Armat 130-mm naval gun; Anti-submarine warfare: 2 × 6 Paket-NK dual use anti-torpedo/anti-submarine torpedoes
- Aviation facilities: Helipad and hangar for up to two medium-lift helicopters

The Lider class (Russian: Лидер, lit. 'leader'), also referred to as Shkval class (Russian: шквал, lit. 'squall'), Russian designation Project 23560 Lider for domestic use and Project 23560E Shkval for export, is a project of combined stealth nuclear-powered guided-missile destroyer and cruiser, under consideration for the Russian Navy.

In April 2020, the Lider project was reported to be suspended. However, in August 2025, Admiral Alexander Moiseev the commander-in-chief of the Navy, stated that the project remained under development.

== History ==
Project approval was given in 2013, and in 2015, Severnoye Design Bureau was awarded with a contract for the creation of a smaller non-nuclear and heavier nuclear-powered variant of the future destroyer. In 2016, the Krylov State Scientific Center handed the preliminary design of the destroyer to the Russian Navy. Initially, twelve ships were planned to be built and split between Russia's Northern and Pacific fleets. Later, construction of eight vessels was mentioned.

A May 2017 report indicated that the Lider-class destroyer had been dropped from the Russia's State Armament Programme for 2018–2027 due to financing reductions, however in June 2017, United Shipbuilding Corporation announced the Russian Defense Ministry had approved the preliminary design of the Lider class destroyer.

In February 2019, the decision was made to build the 19,000 ton nuclear-powered variant of the destroyer, instead of the proposed 12–13,000 ton variant equipped with a gas-turbine powerplant. Two vessels are expected to have been built by the end of the 2020s at a cost of RUB100 billion per vessel. It was stated the construction of the lead vessel could begin as soon as 2023. As of 2026, no such construction has begun.

On April 18, 2020, Russian newspaper Interfax reported that the Severnoye Design Bureau had suspended development on the Lider. However, in June, Alexei Rakhmanov, head of the United Shipbuilding Corporation, reported that the project was still moving forward.

In an interview on 15 August 2022, Rakhmanov reaffirmed that the project has not been cancelled, and is still under development. However, he also emphasised that the Russian Ministry of Defence will only choose one large warship project for construction, and that they favour the Project 22350M Super Gorshkov frigate due to the favourable performance of the class. In August 2025, Admiral Alexander Moiseev stated that project remained under development though limited Russian access to critical technologies might continue to pose constraints on the project's progress.

== Design ==
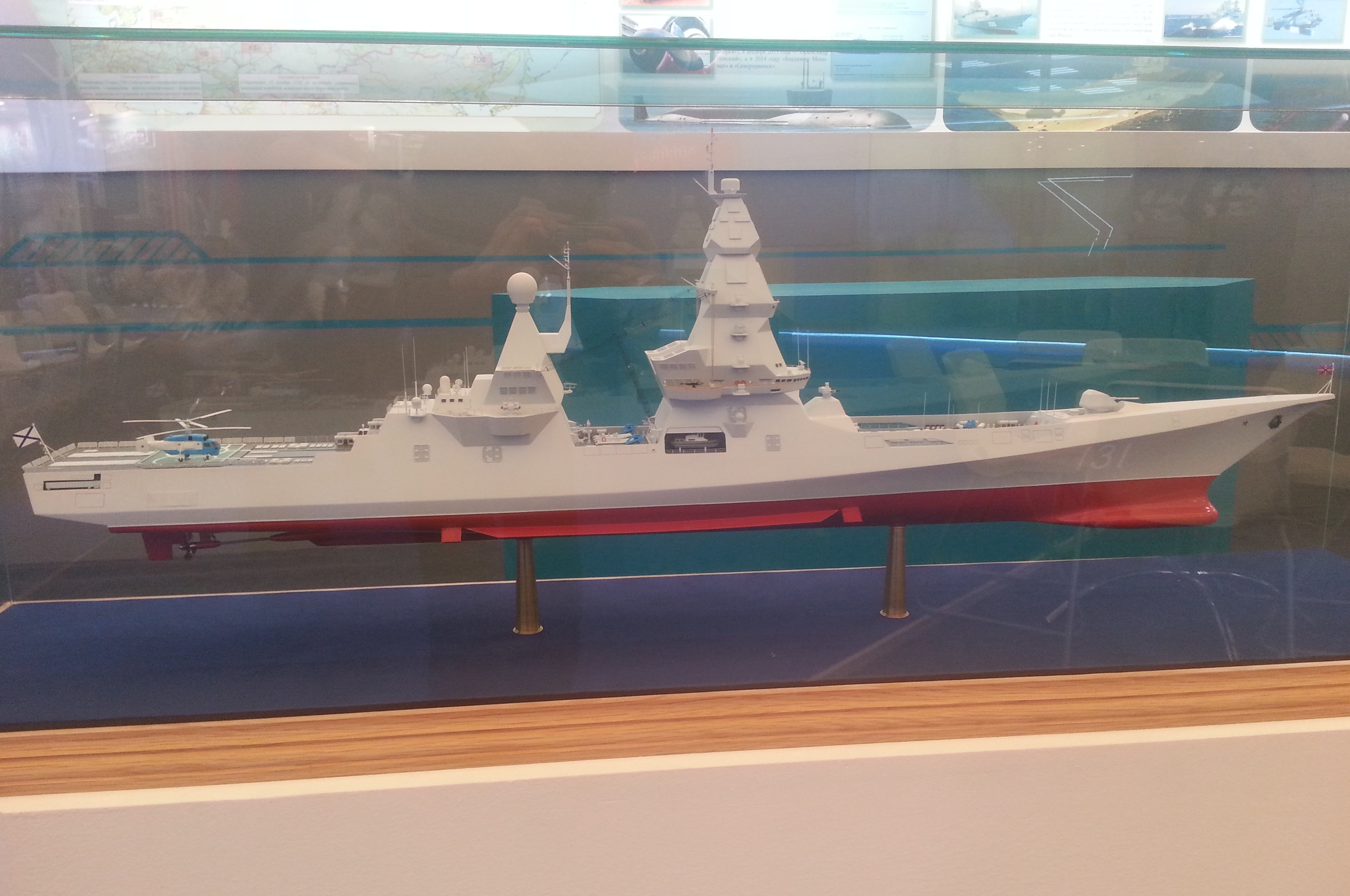
Starboard view of the mockup at «Army 2015»

According to Valeriy Polovinki, Advisor to the General Director of the Krylov State Research Center, who worked out the destroyer's preliminary design, "The Lider will be a universal ship, triple-hatted as a destroyer, large ASW ship and guided missile cruiser while being smaller than Project 1144 ships and carrying far more weaponry", as reported in The Defence Talk. It was subsequently reported that the new destroyer is meant to replace the Sovremenny-class destroyers, the main anti-surface warships of the Russian Navy, as well as the Slava-class cruisers and the Udaloy-class anti-submarine destroyers.

The ships will be about 230 metres (754 ft 7 in) long with a beam of 20 metres (65 ft 7 in), and a maximum speed of 32 knots (59 km/h). The vessels are estimated to displace up to 19,000 tons. In total, they should carry a combination of at least 200 missiles of different variants.

== See also ==
- Future of the Russian Navy
- List of active Russian Navy ships
- List of ships of Russia by project number
