= List of Arleigh Burke-class destroyers =

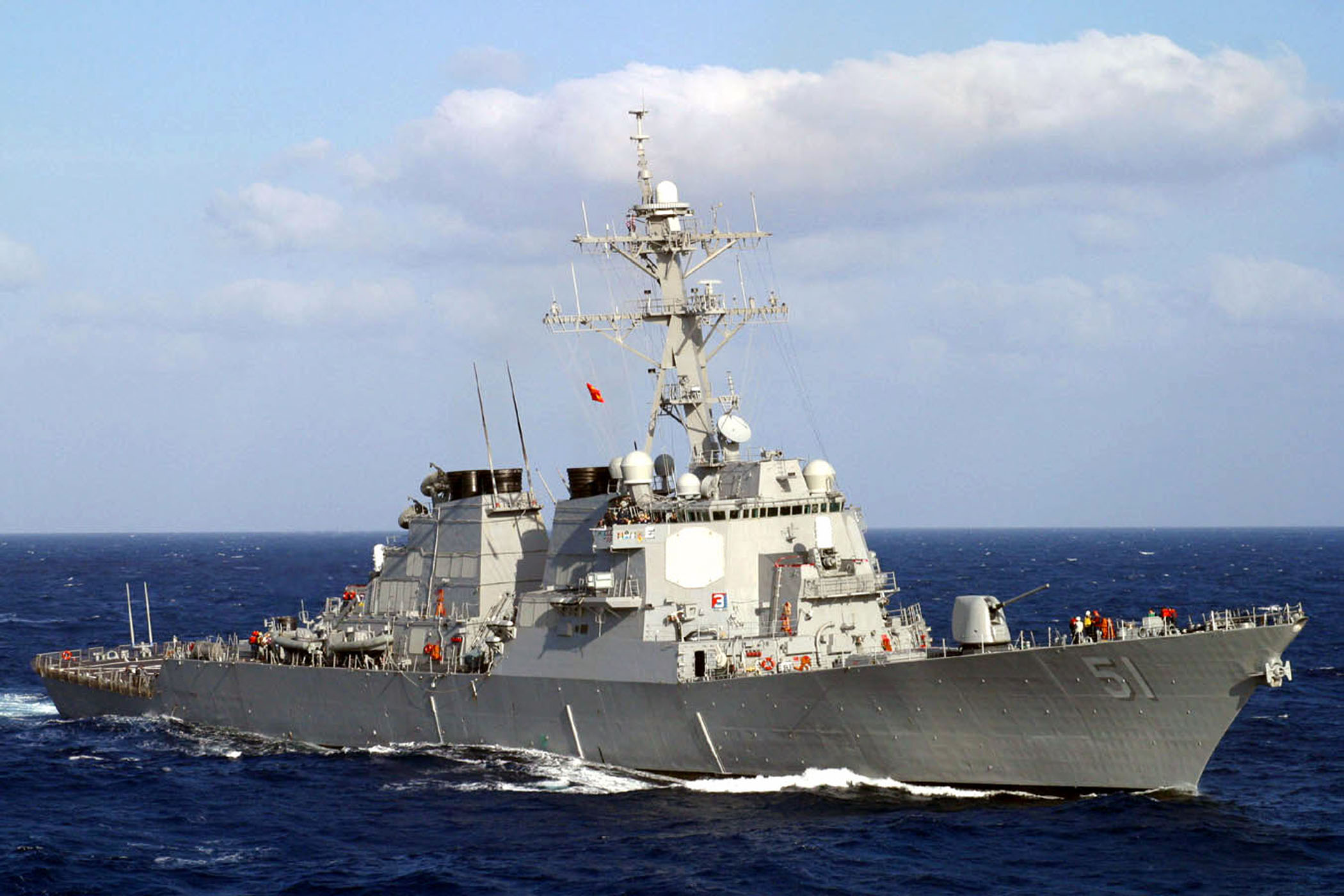
USS Arleigh Burke, a Flight I ship and the lead of her class, seen here on deployment in 2003

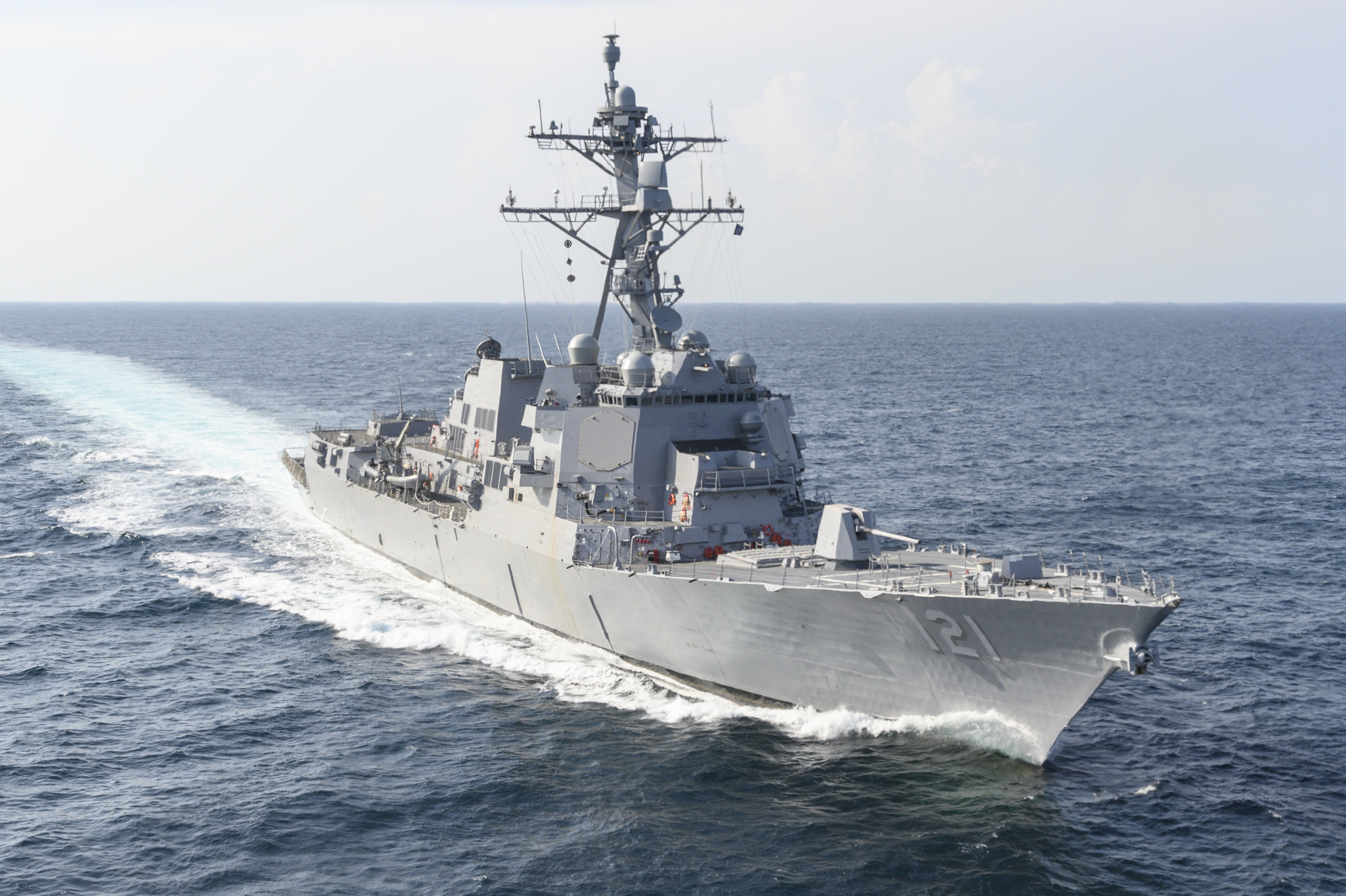
USS Frank E. Petersen Jr., a Flight IIA "T.I." ship, commissioned in May 2022

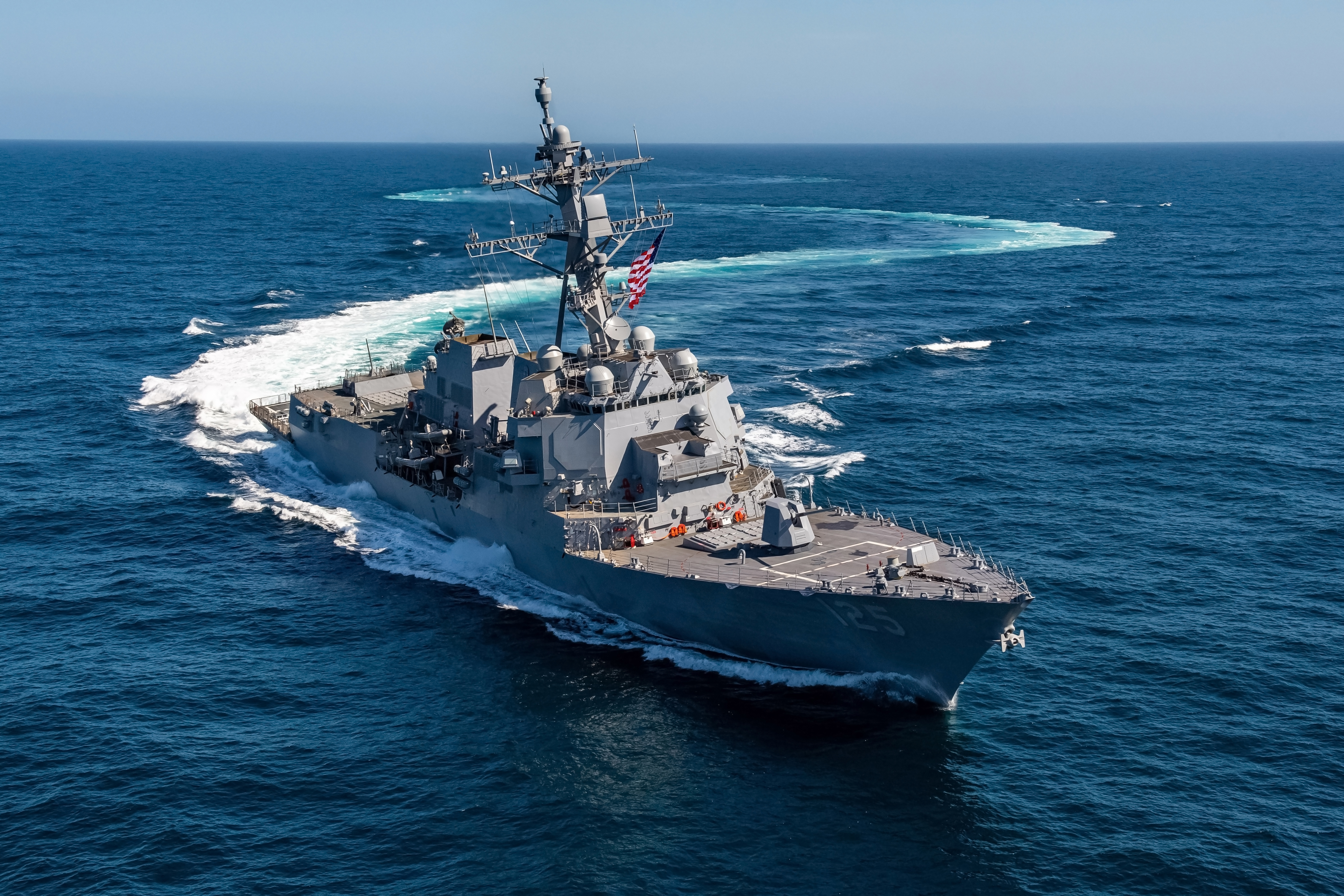
USS Jack H. Lucas, a Flight III ship, acceptance trials, May 2023

This is a list of Arleigh Burke-class destroyers, serving the United States Navy, including ships in active service as of April 2026, as well as those currently under construction or authorized for future construction.

== Ships in class ==
| Name | Hull no. | Flight | Builder | Laid down | Launched | Commissioned | Home port | Status |
|---|---|---|---|---|---|---|---|---|
| Arleigh Burke | DDG-51 | I | Bath Iron Works | 6 December 1988 | 16 September 1989 | 4 July 1991 | Rota, Spain | Active |
| Barry | DDG-52 | I | Ingalls Shipbuilding | 26 February 1990 | 10 May 1991 | 12 December 1992 | Everett, Washington | Active |
| John Paul Jones | DDG-53 | I | Bath Iron Works | 8 August 1990 | 26 October 1991 | 18 December 1993 | Everett, Washington | Active |
| Curtis Wilbur | DDG-54 | I | Bath Iron Works | 12 March 1991 | 16 May 1992 | 19 March 1994 | San Diego, California | Active |
| Stout | DDG-55 | I | Ingalls Shipbuilding | 8 August 1991 | 16 October 1992 | 13 August 1994 | Norfolk, Virginia | Active |
| John S. McCain | DDG-56 | I | Bath Iron Works | 3 September 1991 | 26 September 1992 | 2 July 1994 | Everett, Washington | Active |
| Mitscher | DDG-57 | I | Ingalls Shipbuilding | 12 February 1992 | 7 May 1993 | 10 December 1994 | Norfolk, Virginia | Active |
| Laboon | DDG-58 | I | Bath Iron Works | 23 March 1992 | 20 February 1993 | 18 March 1995 | Norfolk, Virginia | Active |
| Russell | DDG-59 | I | Ingalls Shipbuilding | 24 July 1992 | 20 October 1993 | 20 May 1995 | San Diego, California | Active |
| Paul Hamilton | DDG-60 | I | Bath Iron Works | 24 August 1992 | 24 July 1993 | 27 May 1995 | San Diego, California | Active |
| Ramage | DDG-61 | I | Ingalls Shipbuilding | 4 January 1993 | 11 February 1994 | 22 July 1995 | Mayport, Florida | Active |
| Fitzgerald | DDG-62 | I | Bath Iron Works | 9 February 1993 | 29 January 1994 | 14 October 1995 | San Diego, California | Active |
| Stethem | DDG-63 | I | Ingalls Shipbuilding | 11 May 1993 | 17 June 1994 | 21 October 1995 | San Diego, California | Active |
| Carney | DDG-64 | I | Bath Iron Works | 8 August 1993 | 23 July 1994 | 13 April 1996 | Mayport, Florida | Active |
| Benfold | DDG-65 | I | Ingalls Shipbuilding | 27 September 1993 | 9 November 1994 | 30 March 1996 | Yokosuka, Japan | Active |
| Gonzalez | DDG-66 | I | Bath Iron Works | 3 February 1994 | 18 February 1995 | 12 October 1996 | Norfolk, Virginia | Active |
| Cole | DDG-67 | I | Ingalls Shipbuilding | 28 February 1994 | 10 February 1995 | 8 June 1996 | Norfolk, Virginia | Active |
| The Sullivans | DDG-68 | I | Bath Iron Works | 27 July 1994 | 12 August 1995 | 19 April 1997 | Mayport, Florida | Active |
| Milius | DDG-69 | I | Ingalls Shipbuilding | 8 August 1994 | 1 August 1995 | 23 November 1996 | Yokosuka, Japan | Active |
| Hopper | DDG-70 | I | Bath Iron Works | 23 February 1995 | 6 January 1996 | 6 September 1997 | Pearl Harbor, Hawaii | Active |
| Ross | DDG-71 | I | Ingalls Shipbuilding | 10 April 1995 | 22 March 1996 | 28 June 1997 | Norfolk, Virginia | Active |
| Mahan | DDG-72 | II | Bath Iron Works | 17 August 1995 | 29 June 1996 | 14 February 1998 | Norfolk, Virginia | Active |
| Decatur | DDG-73 | II | Bath Iron Works | 11 January 1996 | 10 November 1996 | 29 August 1998 | San Diego, California | Active |
| McFaul | DDG-74 | II | Ingalls Shipbuilding | 26 January 1996 | 18 January 1997 | 25 April 1998 | Norfolk, Virginia | Active |
| Donald Cook | DDG-75 | II | Bath Iron Works | 9 July 1996 | 3 May 1997 | 4 December 1998 | Mayport, Florida | Active |
| Higgins | DDG-76 | II | Bath Iron Works | 14 November 1996 | 4 October 1997 | 24 April 1999 | Yokosuka, Japan | Active |
| O'Kane | DDG-77 | II | Bath Iron Works | 8 May 1997 | 28 March 1998 | 23 October 1999 | San Diego, California | Active |
| Porter | DDG-78 | II | Ingalls Shipbuilding | 2 December 1996 | 12 November 1997 | 20 March 1999 | Norfolk, Virginia | Active |
| Oscar Austin | DDG-79 | IIA (Note: Flight IIA variant with 5"/54-caliber gun) | Bath Iron Works | 9 October 1997 | 7 November 1998 | 19 August 2000 | Rota, Spain | Active |
| Roosevelt | DDG-80 | IIA | Ingalls Shipbuilding | 15 December 1997 | 10 January 1999 | 14 October 2000 | Rota, Spain | Active |
| Winston S. Churchill | DDG-81 | IIA (Note: Flight IIA Variant with 5"/62-caliber gun) | Bath Iron Works | 7 May 1998 | 17 April 1999 | 10 March 2001 | Mayport, Florida | Active |
| Lassen | DDG-82 | IIA | Ingalls Shipbuilding | 24 August 1998 | 16 October 1999 | 21 April 2001 | Mayport, Florida | Active |
| Howard | DDG-83 | IIA | Bath Iron Works | 9 December 1998 | 20 November 1999 | 20 October 2001 | Yokosuka, Japan | Active |
| Bulkeley | DDG-84 | IIA | Ingalls Shipbuilding | 10 May 1999 | 21 June 2000 | 20 August 2001 | Rota, Spain | Active |
| McCampbell | DDG-85 | IIA (Note: Flight IIA Variant with 5"/62-caliber gun, and one 20 mm CIWS (Ewing 2008)) | Bath Iron Works | 15 July 1999 | 2 July 2000 | 17 August 2002 | Yokosuka, Japan | Active |
| Shoup | DDG-86 | IIA | Ingalls Shipbuilding | 13 December 1999 | 22 November 2000 | 22 June 2002 | Yokosuka, Japan | Active |
| Mason | DDG-87 | IIA | Bath Iron Works | 19 January 2000 | 23 June 2001 | 12 April 2003 | Mayport, Florida | Active |
| Preble | DDG-88 | IIA | Ingalls Shipbuilding | 22 June 2000 | 1 June 2001 | 9 November 2002 | Yokosuka, Japan | Active |
| Mustin | DDG-89 | IIA | Ingalls Shipbuilding | 15 January 2001 | 12 December 2001 | 26 July 2003 | Yokosuka, Japan | Active |
| Chafee | DDG-90 | IIA | Bath Iron Works | 12 April 2001 | 2 November 2002 | 18 October 2003 | San Diego, California | Active |
| Pinckney | DDG-91 | IIA | Ingalls Shipbuilding | 16 July 2001 | 26 June 2002 | 29 May 2004 | San Diego, California | Active |
| Momsen | DDG-92 | IIA | Bath Iron Works | 16 November 2001 | 19 July 2003 | 28 August 2004 | San Diego, California | Active |
| Chung-Hoon | DDG-93 | IIA | Ingalls Shipbuilding | 14 January 2002 | 15 December 2002 | 18 September 2004 | Pearl Harbor, Hawaii | Active |
| Nitze | DDG-94 | IIA | Bath Iron Works | 20 September 2002 | 3 April 2004 | 5 March 2005 | Norfolk, Virginia | Active |
| James E. Williams | DDG-95 | IIA | Ingalls Shipbuilding | 15 July 2002 | 25 June 2003 | 11 December 2004 | Norfolk, Virginia | Active |
| Bainbridge | DDG-96 | IIA | Bath Iron Works | 7 May 2003 | 13 November 2004 | 12 November 2005 | Norfolk, Virginia | Active |
| Halsey | DDG-97 | IIA | Ingalls Shipbuilding | 13 January 2002 | 9 January 2004 | 30 July 2005 | San Diego, California | Active |
| Forrest Sherman | DDG-98 | IIA | Ingalls Shipbuilding | 7 August 2003 | 2 October 2004 | 28 January 2006 | Norfolk, Virginia | Active |
| Farragut | DDG-99 | IIA | Bath Iron Works | 9 January 2004 | 23 July 2005 | 10 June 2006 | Mayport, Florida | Active |
| Kidd | DDG-100 | IIA | Ingalls Shipbuilding | 29 April 2004 | 15 December 2004 | 9 June 2007 | Everett, Washington | Active |
| Gridley | DDG-101 | IIA | Bath Iron Works | 30 July 2004 | 28 December 2005 | 10 February 2007 | Everett, Washington | Active |
| Sampson | DDG-102 | IIA | Bath Iron Works | 20 March 2005 | 16 September 2006 | 3 November 2007 | Everett, Washington | Active |
| Truxtun | DDG-103 | IIA | Ingalls Shipbuilding | 11 April 2005 | 17 April 2007 | 25 April 2009 | Norfolk, Virginia | Active |
| Sterett | DDG-104 | IIA | Bath Iron Works | 17 November 2005 | 20 May 2007 | 9 August 2008 | San Diego, California | Active |
| Dewey | DDG-105 | IIA | Ingalls Shipbuilding | 4 October 2006 | 26 January 2008 | 6 March 2010 | Yokosuka, Japan | Active |
| Stockdale | DDG-106 | IIA | Bath Iron Works | 10 August 2006 | 24 February 2008 | 18 April 2009 | San Diego, California | Active |
| Gravely | DDG-107 | IIA | Ingalls Shipbuilding | 26 November 2007 | 30 March 2009 | 20 November 2010 | Norfolk, Virginia | Active |
| Wayne E. Meyer | DDG-108 | IIA | Bath Iron Works | 17 May 2007 | 19 October 2008 | 10 October 2009 | Pearl Harbor, Hawaii | Active |
| Jason Dunham | DDG-109 | IIA | Bath Iron Works | 11 April 2008 | 2 August 2009 | 13 November 2010 | Mayport, Florida | Active |
| William P. Lawrence | DDG-110 | IIA | Ingalls Shipbuilding | 16 September 2008 | 15 December 2009 | 4 June 2011 | Pearl Harbor, Hawaii | Active |
| Spruance | DDG-111 | IIA | Bath Iron Works | 14 May 2009 | 6 June 2010 | 1 October 2011 | San Diego, California | Active |
| Michael Murphy | DDG-112 | IIA | Bath Iron Works | 12 June 2010 | 8 May 2011 | 5 September 2012 | Pearl Harbor, Hawaii | Active |
| John Finn | DDG-113 | IIA Restart | Ingalls Shipbuilding | 5 November 2013 | 28 March 2015 | 15 July 2017 | Yokosuka, Japan | Active |
| Ralph Johnson | DDG-114 | IIA Restart | Ingalls Shipbuilding | 12 September 2014 | 12 December 2015 | 24 March 2018 | Yokosuka, Japan | Active |
| Rafael Peralta | DDG-115 | IIA Restart | Bath Iron Works | 30 October 2014 | 1 November 2015 | 29 July 2017 | Yokosuka, Japan | Active |
| Thomas Hudner | DDG-116 | IIA Technology Insertion | Bath Iron Works | 16 November 2015 | 23 April 2017 | 1 December 2018 | Mayport, Florida | Active |
| Paul Ignatius | DDG-117 | IIA Technology Insertion | Ingalls Shipbuilding | 20 October 2015 | 12 November 2016 | 27 July 2019 | Rota, Spain | Active |
| Daniel Inouye | DDG-118 | IIA Technology Insertion | Bath Iron Works | 14 May 2018 | 27 October 2019 | 8 December 2021 | Pearl Harbor, Hawaii | Active |
| Delbert D. Black | DDG-119 | IIA Technology Insertion | Ingalls Shipbuilding | 1 June 2016 | 8 September 2017 | 26 September 2020 | Mayport, Florida | Active |
| Carl M. Levin | DDG-120 | IIA Technology Insertion | Bath Iron Works | 1 February 2019 | 16 May 2021 | 24 June 2023 | Pearl Harbor, Hawaii | Active |
| Frank E. Petersen Jr. | DDG-121 | IIA Technology Insertion | Ingalls Shipbuilding | 21 February 2017 | 13 July 2018 | 14 May 2022 | Pearl Harbor, Hawaii | Active |
| John Basilone | DDG-122 | IIA Technology Insertion | Bath Iron Works | 10 January 2020 | 12 June 2022 | 9 November 2024 | Rota, Spain | Active |
| Lenah Sutcliffe Higbee | DDG-123 | IIA Technology Insertion | Ingalls Shipbuilding | 14 November 2017 | 27 January 2020 | 13 May 2023 | San Diego, California | Active |
| Harvey C. Barnum Jr. | DDG-124 | IIA Technology Insertion | Bath Iron Works | 6 April 2021 | 27 September 2023 | 11 April 2026 | Norfolk, Virginia | Active |
| Jack H. Lucas | DDG-125 | III | Ingalls Shipbuilding | 8 November 2019 | 4 June 2021 | 7 October 2023 | San Diego, California | Active |
| Louis H. Wilson Jr. | DDG-126 | III | Bath Iron Works | 16 May 2023 | 10 October 2025 | Estimated in 2028 | | Launched |
| Patrick Gallagher | DDG-127 | IIA Technology Insertion (Note: The DDG-127 contract was awarded separately at a later date. Though two ships preceding her, DDG-125 & DDG-126 had begun the Flight III series, DDG-127 was designated as a Flight IIA Technology Insertion build (Department of Defense 2017). The Flight III series continued with DDG-128.) | Bath Iron Works | 30 March 2022 | 16 October 2024 | Estimated in 2027 | Norfolk, Virginia | Delivered |
| Ted Stevens | DDG-128 | III | Ingalls Shipbuilding | 9 March 2022 | 15 August 2023 | 3 October 2026 | Norfolk, Virginia | Active |
| Jeremiah Denton | DDG-129 | III | Ingalls Shipbuilding | 16 August 2022 | 25 March 2025 | Estimated in 2027 | | Launched |
| William Charette | DDG-130 | III | Bath Iron Works | 29 August 2024 | | Estimated in 2029 | | Christened |
| George M. Neal | DDG-131 | III | Ingalls Shipbuilding | 15 December 2023 | 1 April 2026 | Estimated in 2028 | | Launched |
| Quentin Walsh | DDG-132 | III | Bath Iron Works | 20 May 2025 | | | | Under construction |
| Sam Nunn | DDG-133 | III | Ingalls Shipbuilding | 22 November 2024 | | | | Under construction |
| John E. Kilmer | DDG-134 | III | Bath Iron Works | 10 September 2026 | | | | Under construction |
| Thad Cochran | DDG-135 | III | Ingalls Shipbuilding | 23 October 2025 | | | | Under construction |
| Richard G. Lugar | DDG-136 | III | Bath Iron Works | | | | | Under construction |
| John F. Lehman | DDG-137 | III | Ingalls Shipbuilding | | | | | Approved for construction |
| J. William Middendorf | DDG-138 | III | Bath Iron Works | | | | | Approved for construction |
| Telesforo Trinidad | DDG-139 | III | Ingalls Shipbuilding | | | | | Approved for construction |
| Thomas G. Kelley | DDG-140 | III | Bath Iron Works | | | | | Authorized |
| Ernest E. Evans | DDG-141 | III | Ingalls Shipbuilding | | | | | Authorized |
| Charles J. French | DDG-142 | III | Ingalls Shipbuilding | | | | | Authorized |
| Richard J. Danzig | DDG-143 | III | Ingalls Shipbuilding | | | | | Authorized |
| Michael G. Mullen | DDG-144 | III | Bath Iron Works | | | | | Authorized |
| Intrepid | DDG-145 | III | Ingalls Shipbuilding | | | | | Authorized |
| Robert Kerrey | DDG-146 | III | Ingalls Shipbuilding | | | | | Authorized |
| Ray Mabus | DDG-147 | III | Ingalls Shipbuilding | | | | | Authorized |
| Kyle Carpenter | DDG-148 | III | Bath Iron Works | | | | | Authorized |
| Robert R. Ingram | DDG-149 | III | Ingalls Shipbuilding | | | | | Authorized |

== Sources ==
- Department of Defense (28 September 2017). "DoD Contracts". United States Department of Defense. Archived from the original on 14 March 2018.
- Ewing, Philip (16 September 2008). "Analyst: DDGs without CIWS vulnerable". Navy Times.
