= Louis Wilson =

Louis Wilson may refer to:

- Louis B. Wilson (1866–1943), chief of pathology at Mayo Clinic
- Louis Dicken Wilson (1789–1847), politician and general from North Carolina
- Louis H. Wilson Jr. (1920–2005), 26th Commandant of the Marine Corps and a recipient of the Medal of Honor
  - USS Louis H. Wilson Jr.
- Louis Round Wilson (1876–1979), American librarian
- Louis L. Wilson Jr. (1919–2010), U.S. Air Force general

== See also ==
- Lou Wilson, Australian rules footballer
- Lewis Wilson (disambiguation)
