= Lou Wilson (disambiguation) =

Lou Wilson is an American actor.

Lou Wilson may also refer to:

- Lou Wilson (footballer) (1887–1970), Australian rules footballer
- Lew Wilson, rower

== See also ==
- Louise Wilson, British professor of fashion design
- Louis Wilson (disambiguation)
- Lewis Wilson (disambiguation)
