= Basilone =

Basilone may refer to:

== People ==
- Basil (name), a name of which "Basilone" is a variant
- John Basilone (1916–1945), an American soldier and U.S. Marine, recipient of the Medal of Honor

== Ships ==
- USS Basilone, a United States Navy Gearing-class destroyer in commission from 1949 to 1977
- USS John Basilone, a United States Navy Arleigh Burke-class guided-missile destroyer
