= Arleigh Burke (disambiguation) =

Arleigh Burke may refer to:

- Arleigh Burke (1901–1996), U.S. Navy admiral
- USS Arleigh Burke (DDG-51), a U.S. Navy guided missile destroyer, the lead ship of the Arleigh-Burke-class
- Arleigh Burke-class destroyer, a U.S. Navy class of AEGIS-equipped missile destroyers
- Arleigh Burke Fleet Trophy, an annual award of the U.S. Navy for the most improved unit
- Arleigh Burke Theater, United States Navy Memorial, Washington, D.C., United States

== See also ==
- List of Arleigh Burke-class destroyers
- Category: Arleigh Burke-class destroyers
- Arleigh (disambiguation)
- Burke (disambiguation)
