= Lewis Wilson (disambiguation) =

Lewis Wilson (1920–2000) was an actor.

Lewis Wilson may also refer to:

- Hack Wilson (1900–1948, Lewis Wilson), American Major League Baseball player
- Lewis Wilson (footballer) (born 1993)

== See also ==
- Louis Wilson (disambiguation)
- Lew Wilson
- Lou Wilson (disambiguation)
