= SS City of Lowell =

Passenger steamboat vessel

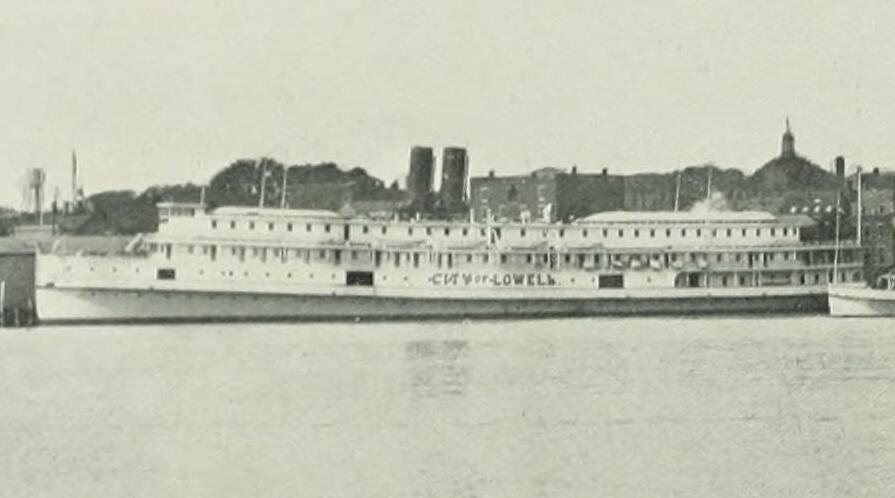
- SS City of Lowell at New London, circa 1901

History
- Name: City of Lowell
- Owner: Norwich & New York Transportation Co. (1894–1904 ); New England Navigation Company (1904–1907); New York, New Haven & Hartford Railroad Co. (1907); Consolidated Railway Co. 1907; New England Steamship Co. (1907–1908); New England Navigation Company (1908–1912); New England Steamship Co. (1912–1939); Northern Metals Co.(1939–1942); War Shipping Administration (1942–1943); War Department (1943–1945)
- Route: New York—New London
- Builder: Bath Iron Works
- Launched: 21 November 1893
- Acquired: Delivered: 2 July 1894
- In service: 1894–1939, 1943–1945
- Out of service: 1939–1943, 7 December 1945
- Identification: U.S. Official Number: 127035
- Fate: Sold November 1946 for scrapping

General characteristics
- Type: Coastal passenger night steamer
- Tonnage: 2,975 GRT
- Displacement: 2,400 tons
- Length: 336.5 ft (102.6 m) LOA
- Beam: extreme over guards: 66 ft 1 in (20.1 m); Moulded 40 ft 6 in (12.3 m)
- Draft: 13 ft (4.0 m)
- Depth: 17 ft 7 in (5.4 m)
- Capacity: 633 passengers, first class sleeping accommodations.; Freight: 101,700 cubic feet (2,879.8 m^{3}) on midships main deck
- Crew: 107
- Notes: One of the many steamers designed for overnight passage between major coastal cities.

City of Lowell was a twin screw passenger steamer launched on 21 November 1893 by Bath Iron Works and delivered in July 1894 for the Norwich & New York Transportation Company for use on Long Island Sound. The Norwich Line, operated by the New York and New England Railroad, placed the steamer on the overnight service between New York and New London, Connecticut. Passengers connected by rail at New London for Boston and Worcester, Massachusetts. The ship was in commercial operation until 1939 when apparently laid up awaiting scrapping. At the outbreak of World War II City of Lowell was acquired by the War Shipping Administration with eventual transfer of title to the War Department for use as an Army troop transport. The ship was sold to Potomac Shipwrecking Company of Washington, D.C., in November 1946 for scrapping.

== Construction and design ==
City of Lowell was intended for operation in Long Island Sound and inshore waters served by the Norwich Line in passenger service between New York and New London, Connecticut. The ship was designed by A. Cory Smith, a New York naval architect, and began as Bath Iron Works' eighth hull and first steel commercial vessel. City of Lowell was launched on 21 November 1893 and delivered 2 July 1894.

The ship was steel hulled with five decks: lower, main, saloon, gallery and hurricane. The lower deck was devoted to the machinery spaces, 63 crew berths and "free berths" for passengers, 90 berths forward and 102 aft of the machinery space. The main deck was divided fore and aft by dedicated and entirely separate midships cargo space, about 200 ft (61.0 m) in length and 101,700 cubic feet (2,879.8 m^{3}) capacity. Forward of the cargo space were engine room crew accommodations and machinery while aft was a social hall, officers state rooms and lastly a "ladies cabin" with six double berth state rooms, 27 "free berths" and toilets. The saloon deck, devoted to first class passengers, had 82 double berth staterooms and 24 "bridal chambers" with brass beds with a midships section arranged with a view into the engine room. Officers quarters, dining room, kitchen, café and 36 double berth state rooms were on the gallery deck.

The two four-bladed bronze propellers, 11 feet (3.4 m) im diameter with a pitch of 15 feet 8 inches (4.8 m), were driven by triple expansion steam engines fed by six single ended Scotch boilers 12 feet 10 inches (3.9 m) long and 13 feet 6 inches (4.1 m) in diameter which each had three 43 inches (1.1 m) in diameter furnaces. Three boilers were placed on each side of the boiler room with engines, boilers and 90 tons of coal, enough for a round trip, taking up 74 feet (22.6 m) of the ship's midships length. Accumulated ash was washed overboard using Horace See's patented hydraulic ash ejector. Total power was 4,650 (IHP) at 125 revolutions per minute. The main engines drove two 70 horsepower electric dynamos located aft by means of a belt with each unit capable of lighting the 700 electric lamps and searchlight.

The ship underwent no official speed trials, but outpaced all other vessels she encountered in initial runs and gained the nickname "Greyhound of the Sound" as a result. In a race with the steamship Priscilla she averaged 22 miles per hour (19 kn; 35 km/h). The use of twin screw steamers using this type of power had become popular over the six years before City of Lowell was launched and the ship was outfitted with instruments for performance measurements during regular operations to gather information about the new propulsion. On 29 May 1895 the ship's slowest service speed, 107 revolutions, was measured for indicated engine power, water consumption and boiler economy over a measured course with four boilers. On 30 May the same factors and speed were measured at 126.86 revolutions and six boilers for a "still water speed" of 22.19 miles per hour (19.28 kn; 35.71 km/h). The tests indicated high efficiency, estimated at 64%, for screw propulsion aided by the ships efficient hull design.

== Commercial service ==
The Norwich Line, operated by the New York and New England Railroad, operated steamers on the inside route between New York and New London with connecting train service to Boston and Worcester. A July 1895 advertisement, featuring City of Lowell as the new ship featured the nickname "Greyhound of the Sound" as unsurpassed by any steamer on Long Island Sound. The ship's running mate on the route was City of Worcester. The advertisement's schedule shows 5:30 p.m. departures from New York, with table d'hote dinner for $0.75, meeting trains leaving New London as early as 5:35 a.m. for train arrivals in Boston at 9:00 a.m. and Worcester by 7:55 a.m. Southbound schedules are indicated with a train leaving the New York & New England Railroad Depot at 7:15 p.m. meeting steamers at New London for arrival in New York at 7:00 a.m.

Ownership changes are not reflected in operation or basic affiliations as a 1907 advertisement shows City of Lowell and a new running mate, Chester W. Chapin, operating the same route and schedule for Norwich Line under the overall group of lines under the New England Navigation Company. That company operated steamers on the New Haven Line, Bridgeport Line, Providence Line, New Bedford Line, Providence-Block Island Line and New London-Block Island Line with some lines operational only in summer months and all serving closely with railroads and scheduled rail connections.

On 4 November 1904 she sank the ferry Columbia in a collision in dense fog on the East River.

City of Lowell was retired in 1938 with an abortive plan to use the ship as a trailer ship. (Note: Lloyd's registers for 1939–1942 show Trailerships, Inc. as owner.)

== World War II ==
City of Lowell was delivered to the United States War Shipping Administration (WSA) on 6 June 1942 at Philadelphia with title transferred on 20 June from Northern Metals Company which had the ship for scrapping. The ship was then laid up at Tacony, Pennsylvania until title was purchased by the War Department on 29 November 1943.

The ship was towed to Brooklyn and became the barracks ship at the Brooklyn Army Terminal, then the core of the New York Port of Embarkation, replacing Meteor which was formerly the Chester W. Chapin, (Note: Built 1899 this ship was taken for war service March 1942, bareboat chartered by the Army, and operated as barracks ship at Brooklyn Army Terminal then passenger service between Washington and Norfolk.) running mate on the New York—New London route. In November 1945 City of Lowell was towed to be laid up and placed in reserve at Lee Hall, Virginia 7 December 1945. (Note: Grover has the ship as a troop transport as is the grouping for Meteor. The Army was not often particular as to exactly what "troop" function was served.) On 15 November 1946 City of Lowell was sold to Potomac Shipwrecking Company of Washington, D.C. for scrapping.

== Bibliography ==
- Allen, W.F. (July 1895). "Norwich Line". Traveler's Official Railway Guide for the United States, Canada and Mexico. National Railway Publication Company: 143.
- Allen, W.F. (1907). "The New England Navigation Company". Official Guide of the Railways and Steam Navigation Lines of the United States, Porto Rico, Canada, Mexico and Cuba. 39 (8). National Railway Publication Company.
- Colton, T. (April 2, 2015). "Bath Iron Works, Bath ME". ShipbuildingHistory. T. Colton. Archived from the original on 2 April 2015.
- Denton, J.E. (Professor) (1895). "Performance of the Twin-Screw Steamer City of Lowell". Transactions of the Society of Naval Architects and Marine Engineers (Proceedings of the Third General Meeting of the Society, New York, 7–8 November 1895). 3. New York: Society of Naval Architects and Marine Engineers: 195–216.
- General Dynamics, Bath Iron Works. "Bath Iron Works: History". General Dynamics.
- General Dynamics, Bath Iron Works. "Bath Iron Works: Ship List". General Dynamics.
- Grover, David (1987). U.S. Army Ships and Watercraft of World War II. Naval Institute Press. ISBN 0-87021-766-6. LCCN 87015514.
- Hathaway, Freeman R. (1947). "War Records of Some Coastwise Steamships in World War II" (PDF). The Lookout. 38 (June). Seaman's Church Institute of New York: 2–4.
- Marine Engineer and Naval Architect (1894). "Launches—American". The Marine Engineer. 15 (February). London: 487.
- Marine Engineer and Naval Architect (1894). "The New U.S. Steel Twin-Screw Steamer City of Lowell". The Marine Engineer. 16 (November). London: 317–318.
- Maritime Administration. "City of Lowell". Ship History Database Vessel Status Card. U.S. Department of Transportation, Maritime Administration. Archived from the original on March 4, 2016.
- Mystic Seaport. "City of Lowell (Steamer)". Connecticut Ship Database, 1789–1939. Mystic Seaport.
