= USS Patrick Gallagher =

US Navy guided-missile destroyer

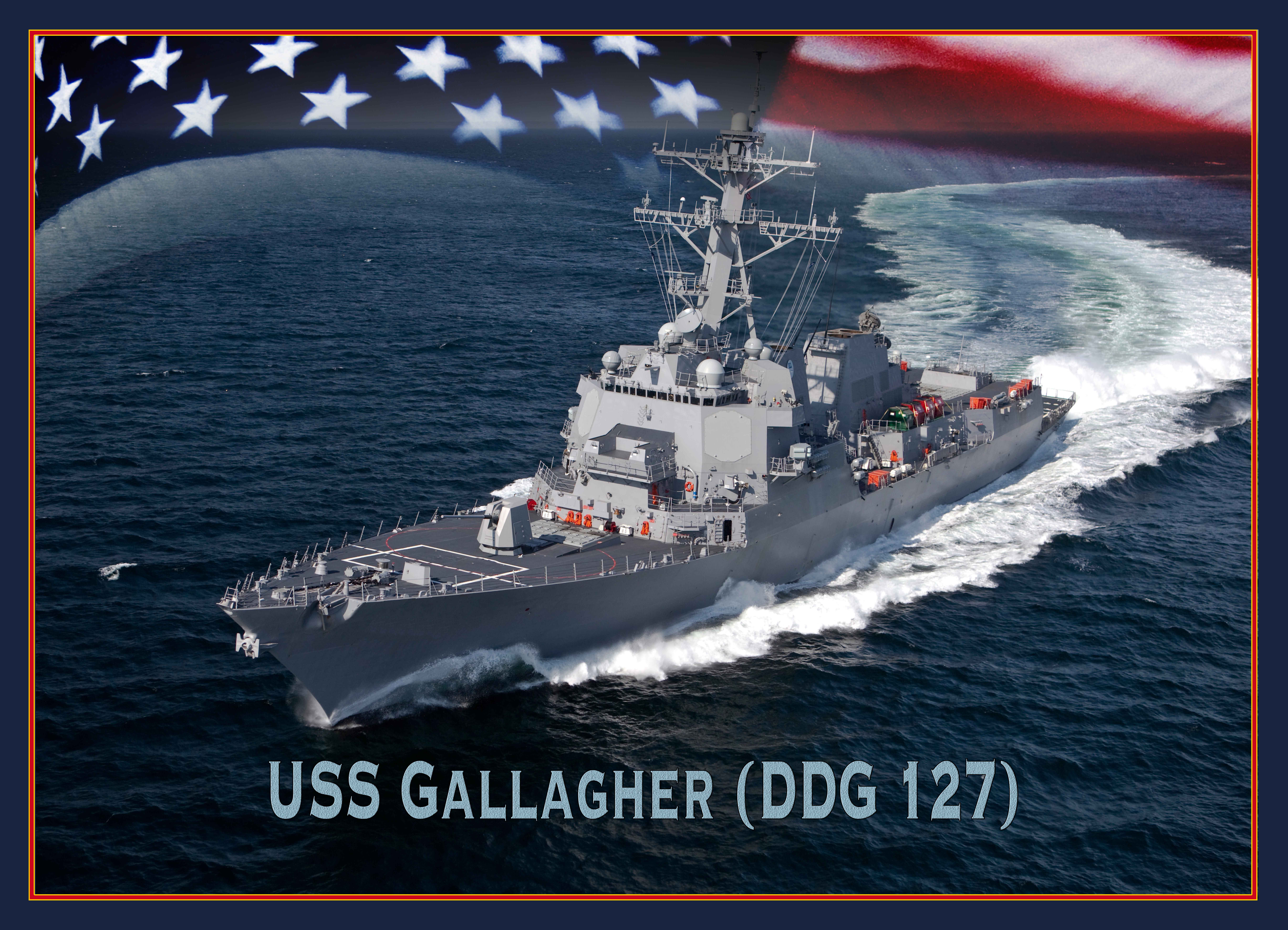
- Graphical depiction of USS Patrick Gallagher

History

United States
- Name: Patrick Gallagher
- Namesake: Patrick Gallagher
- Awarded: 28 September 2017
- Builder: Bath Iron Works
- Laid down: 30 March 2022
- Launched: 16 October 2024
- Sponsored by: Teresa Gallagher Keegan, Rosemarie Gallagher, and Pauline Gallagher
- Christened: 27 July 2024
- Identification: Hull number: DDG-127
- Status: Delivered
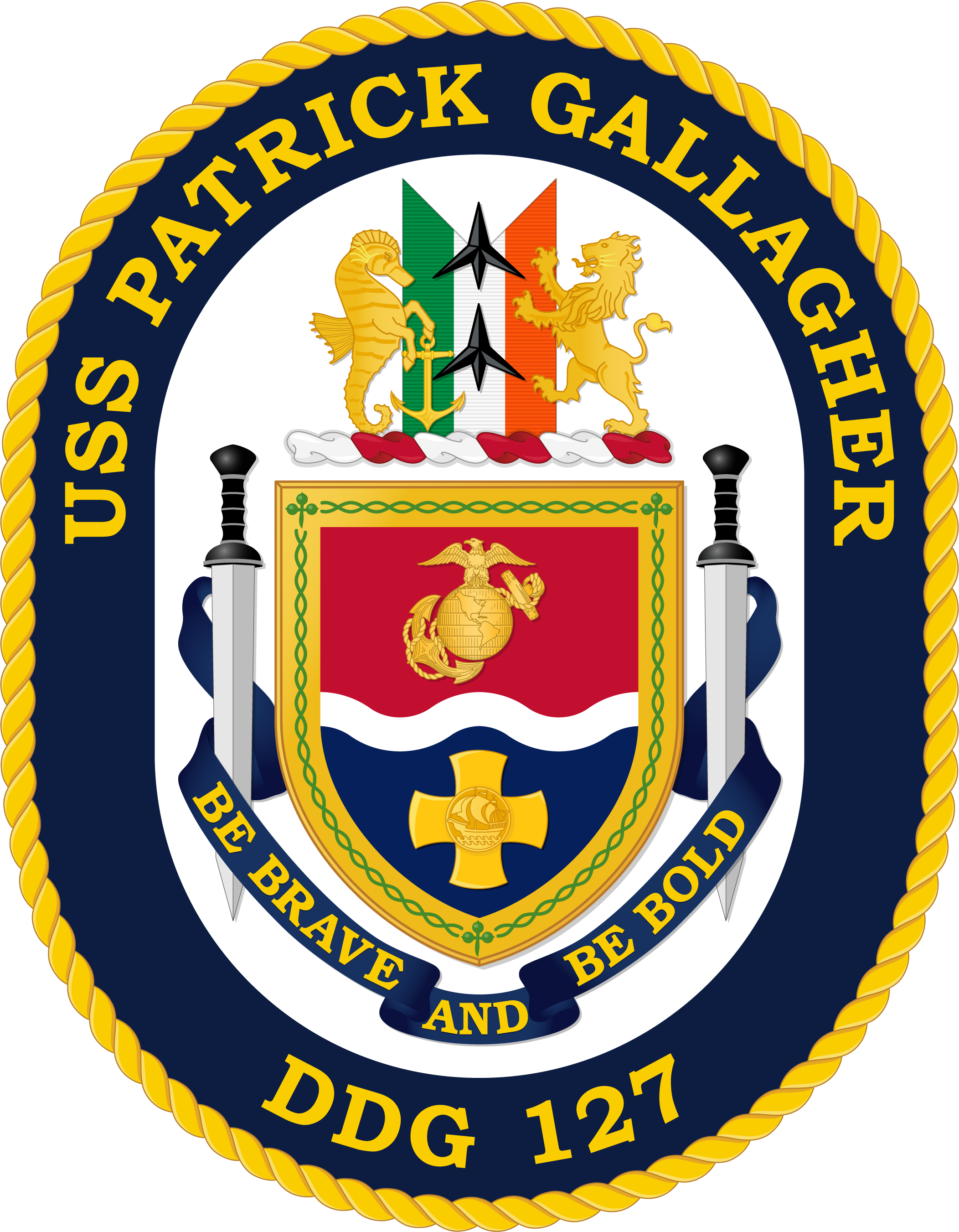
- Badge

General characteristics
- Class & type: Arleigh Burke-class destroyer
- Displacement: 9,217 tons (full load)
- Length: 513 ft (156 m)
- Beam: 66 ft (20 m)
- Propulsion: 4 × General Electric LM2500 gas turbines 100,000 shp (75,000 kW)
- Speed: 31 knots (57 km/h; 36 mph)
- Complement: 380 officers and enlisted
- Armament: Guns: 1 × 5-inch (127 mm)/62 Mk 45 Mod 4 (lightweight gun); 1 × 20 mm (0.8 in) Phalanx CIWS; 2 × 25 mm (0.98 in) Mk 38 machine gun system; 4 × 0.50 in (12.7 mm) caliber guns; Missiles: 1 × 32-cell, 1 × 64-cell (96 total cells) Mk 41 vertical launching system (VLS): RIM-66M surface-to-air missile; RIM-156 surface-to-air missile; RIM-174A Standard ERAM; RIM-161 anti-ballistic missile; RIM-162 ESSM (quad-packed); BGM-109 Tomahawk cruise missile; RUM-139 vertical launch ASROC; Torpedoes: 2 × Mark 32 triple torpedo tubes: Mark 46 lightweight torpedo; Mark 50 lightweight torpedo; Mark 54 lightweight torpedo
- Aircraft carried: 2 × MH-60R Seahawk helicopters
- Aviation facilities: Double hangar and helipad

USS Patrick Gallagher (DDG-127) will be an Arleigh Burke-class (Flight IIA Technology Insertion) Aegis guided missile destroyer, the last Flight IIA Technology Insertion variant. She will be named for Corporal Patrick Gallagher (1944–1967), an Irish-born Marine who earned the Navy Cross during the Vietnam War.

Unlike the previous two Arleigh Burke-class ships USS Jack H. Lucas and USS Louis H. Wilson Jr., which were inserted into the previous multi-year contract and are planned to be built in the Flight III configuration, Patrick Gallagher was separately added to Navy shipbuilding plans by Congress and will be built in the Flight IIA configuration. Bath Iron Works was awarded the contract for Patrick Gallagher on 28 September 2017 and construction started on 9 November 2018. On 30 March 2022, her keel was laid down at Bath Iron Works.

The ship was christened at Bath Iron Works shipyard on 27 July 2024. US Senator Susan Collins of Maine was in attendance. Outside the north gate, a group of around 75 protesters of the Gaza war were blocking roads, engaging in criminal trespass and dumping red liquid on the area in front of BIW's main building. Several were arrested.
