= USS Michael G. Mullen =

Future US Navy destroyer

History

United States
- Name: Michael G. Mullen
- Namesake: Michael Mullen
- Builder: Bath Iron Works
- Identification: Hull number: DDG-144
- Status: Authorized for construction

General characteristics
- Class & type: Arleigh Burke-class destroyer
- Displacement: 9,217 tons (full load)
- Length: 510 ft (160 m)
- Beam: 66 ft (20 m)
- Propulsion: 4 × General Electric LM2500 gas turbines 100,000 shp (75,000 kW)
- Speed: 31 knots (57 km/h; 36 mph)
- Complement: 380 officers and enlisted
- Armament: Guns: 1 × 5-inch (127 mm)/62 Mk 45 Mod 4 (lightweight gun); 1 × 20 mm (0.8 in) Phalanx CIWS; 2 × 25 mm (0.98 in) Mk 38 machine gun system; 4 × 0.50 in (12.7 mm) caliber guns; Missiles: 1 × 32-cell, 1 × 64-cell (96 total cells) Mk 41 vertical launching system (VLS): RIM-66M surface-to-air missile; RIM-156 surface-to-air missile; RIM-174A Standard ERAM; RIM-161 anti-ballistic missile; RIM-162 ESSM (quad-packed); BGM-109 Tomahawk cruise missile; RUM-139 vertical launch ASROC; Torpedoes: 2 × Mark 32 triple torpedo tubes: Mark 46 lightweight torpedo; Mark 50 lightweight torpedo; Mark 54 lightweight torpedo
- Armor: Kevlar-type armor with steel hull. Numerous passive survivability measures.
- Aircraft carried: 2 × MH-60R Seahawk helicopters
- Aviation facilities: Double hangar and helipad

USS Michael G. Mullen (DDG-144) is the planned 94th Arleigh Burke-class (Flight III) Aegis guided missile destroyer of the United States Navy. She is named for former chairman of the Joint Chiefs of Staff, Admiral Michael Mullen.

== Design and construction ==
As a Flight III Arleigh Burke-class destroyer, she would be mounted with the more powerful AN/SPY-6 radar compared to her sister ships. This radar, and other modifications, would allow Flight III destroyers to serve as a replacement for the air-defense roles of Ticonderoga-class cruisers.

She was ordered in 2023 as part of a larger 5-year plan to build 9 Flight III ships and is expected to start fabrication in 2027.

In 2024, she was named after the former chairman, as he was a "visionary leader in the mold of the greatest naval leaders that came before [them]".
