= USS J. William Middendorf =

Guided missile destroyer

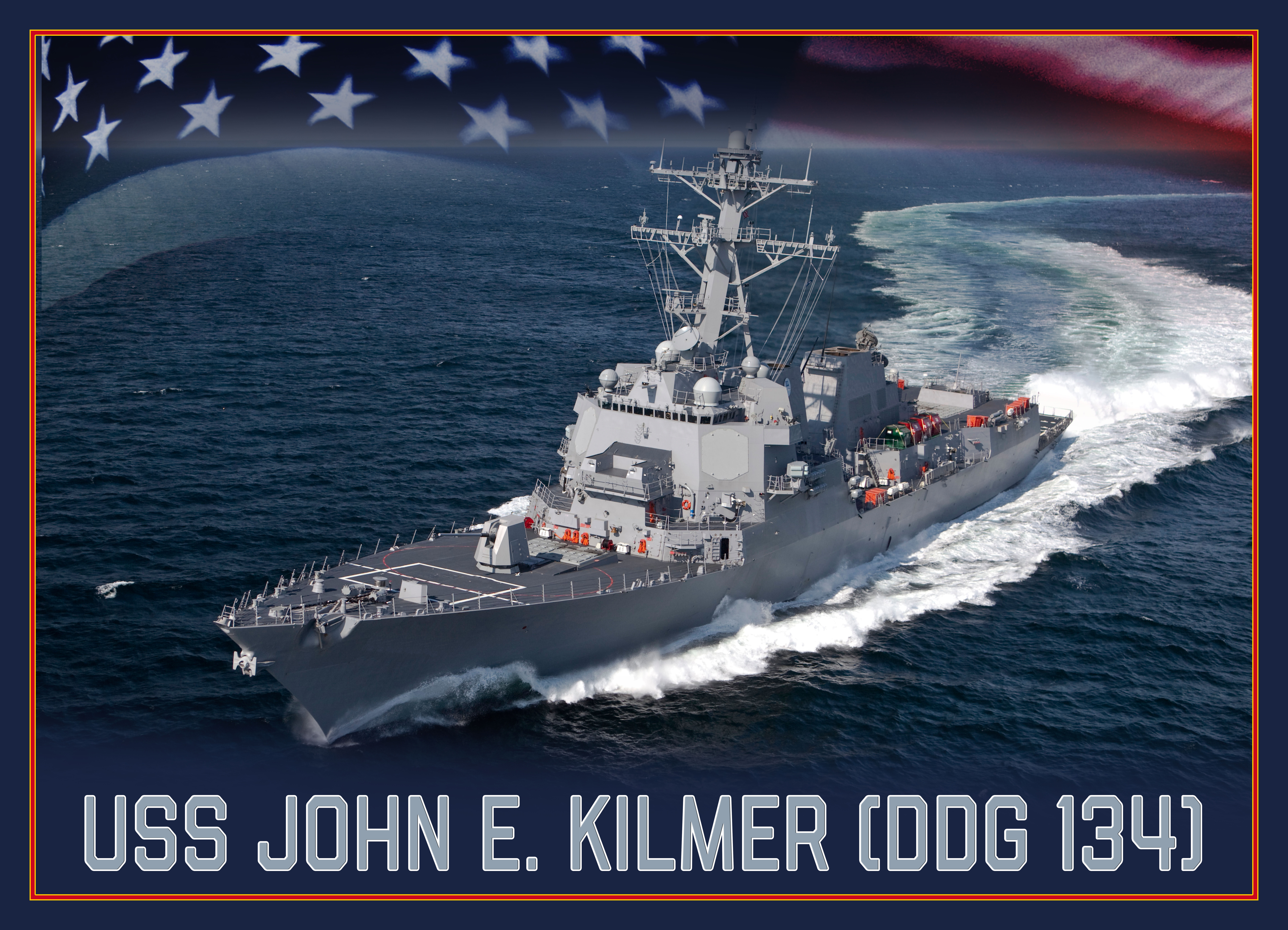
- J. William Middendorf's sister ship John E. Kilmer (artist's rendering)

History

United States
- Name: J. William Middendorf
- Namesake: J. William Middendorf
- Builder: Bath Iron Works
- Identification: Hull number: DDG-138
- Status: Authorized

General characteristics
- Class & type: Arleigh Burke-class destroyer
- Displacement: 9,217 tons (full load)
- Length: 510 ft (160 m)
- Beam: 66 ft (20 m)
- Propulsion: 4 × General Electric LM2500 gas turbines 100,000 shp (75,000 kW)
- Speed: 31 knots (57 km/h; 36 mph)
- Complement: 380 officers and enlisted
- Armament: Guns: 1 × 5-inch (127 mm)/62 Mk 45 Mod 4 (lightweight gun); 1 × 20 mm (0.8 in) Phalanx CIWS; 2 × 25 mm (0.98 in) Mk 38 machine gun system; 4 × 0.50 in (12.7 mm) caliber guns; Missiles: 1 × 32-cell, 1 × 64-cell (96 total cells) Mk 41 vertical launching system (VLS): RIM-66M surface-to-air missile; RIM-156 surface-to-air missile; RIM-174A Standard ERAM; RIM-161 anti-ballistic missile; RIM-162 ESSM (quad-packed); BGM-109 Tomahawk cruise missile; RUM-139 vertical launch ASROC; Torpedoes: 2 × Mark 32 triple torpedo tubes: Mark 46 lightweight torpedo; Mark 50 lightweight torpedo; Mark 54 lightweight torpedo
- Armor: Kevlar-type armor with steel hull. Numerous passive survivability measures.
- Aircraft carried: 2 × MH-60R Seahawk helicopters
- Aviation facilities: Double hangar and helipad

USS J. William Middendorf (DDG-138) is the planned 88th Arleigh Burke-class (Flight III) Aegis guided missile destroyer of the United States Navy. She will honor J. William Middendorf, a former Secretary of the Navy and US Ambassador to the Netherlands. The name was announced 10 June 2022.

== Construction ==
In June 2022, the Secretary of the Navy announced that an Arleigh Burke-class guided-missile destroyer would be named USS J. William Middendorf, to be built by General Dynamics Bath Iron Works. The keel plate unveiling ceremony was held on 11 December 2023, at the Naval War College in Newport, Rhode Island.
