= Bath Iron Works =

American shipyard located on the Kennebec River in Bath, Maine

Coordinates: 43.904494°N 69.814746°W

- Type: Subsidiary
- Industry: Shipbuilding
- Founded: 1884; 142 years ago
- Founder: Thomas W. Hyde
- Headquarters: Bath, Maine, U.S.
- Number of locations: 1
- Area served: United States
- Key people: Charles F. Krugh (president)
- Number of employees: 6,001-6,500 (2025)
- Parent: General Dynamics
- Website: gdbiw.com

Bath Iron Works in 2026 with an Arleigh Burke-class destroyer being constructed (background)

Bath Iron Works (BIW) is a major United States shipyard located on the Kennebec River in Bath, Maine, founded in 1884 as Bath Iron Works, Limited. Since 1995, Bath Iron Works has been a subsidiary of General Dynamics, one of the world's largest defense companies. BIW has built private, commercial, and military vessels, most of which have been ordered by the United States Navy. BIW is ranked the fourth largest employer in Maine.

== History ==
Bath Iron Works was incorporated in 1884 on the Kennebec River by General Thomas W. Hyde, a native of Bath who served in the American Civil War. After the war, he bought a shop that made windlasses and other iron hardware for the wooden ships built in Bath's many shipyards. He expanded the business by improving its practices, entering new markets, and acquiring other local businesses. By 1882, Hyde Windlass was eyeing the new and growing business of iron shipbuilding, and it incorporated as Bath Iron Works in 1884.

On February 28, 1890, BIW won its first contract for complete vessels: two iron gunboats for the Navy. One of these 190-foot (58 m) ships was the Machias, the first ship launched by the company. In 1892, the yard won its first commercial contract for the 2,500-ton steel passenger steamer City of Lowell. In the 1890s, the company built several yachts for wealthy sailors.

In 1899, Hyde was suffering from Bright's Disease and resigned from management of the shipyard, leaving his sons Edward and John in charge. The shipyard began construction of Georgia that same year, the only battleship ever built in Bath. It dominated the yard for five years until its launching in 1904, and was at times the only ship under construction. The yard faced numerous challenges because of the weight of armor and weapons. In sea trials, Georgia averaged 19.26 knots (35.67 km/h; 22.16 mph) for four hours, making her the fastest ship in her class and the fastest battleship in the United States Navy at the time.

The company continued to rely on Navy contracts, which provided 86% of the value of new contracts between 1905 and 1917. By then, a different company named Bath Ironworks (BIW) ran it. The yard also produced fishing trawlers, freighters, and yachts throughout the first half of the century. It went into receivership in 1925 and 6 before being bought by a conglomerate in 1926 and returning to naval ship building . The ships built before its return to naval ship building were mostly yachts such as, Hi-Esmaro, Aras I and Aras II, Caroline, and Corsair IV, which later served as a cruise ship before sinking off Acapulco, Mexico in 1949.

The shipyard was at peak production during World War II (1943–1944), launching a destroyer every 17 days. Bath Iron Works ranked 50th among United States corporations in the value of World War II military production contracts. In 1981, Falcon Transport ordered two tankers, the last commercial vessels built by BIW.

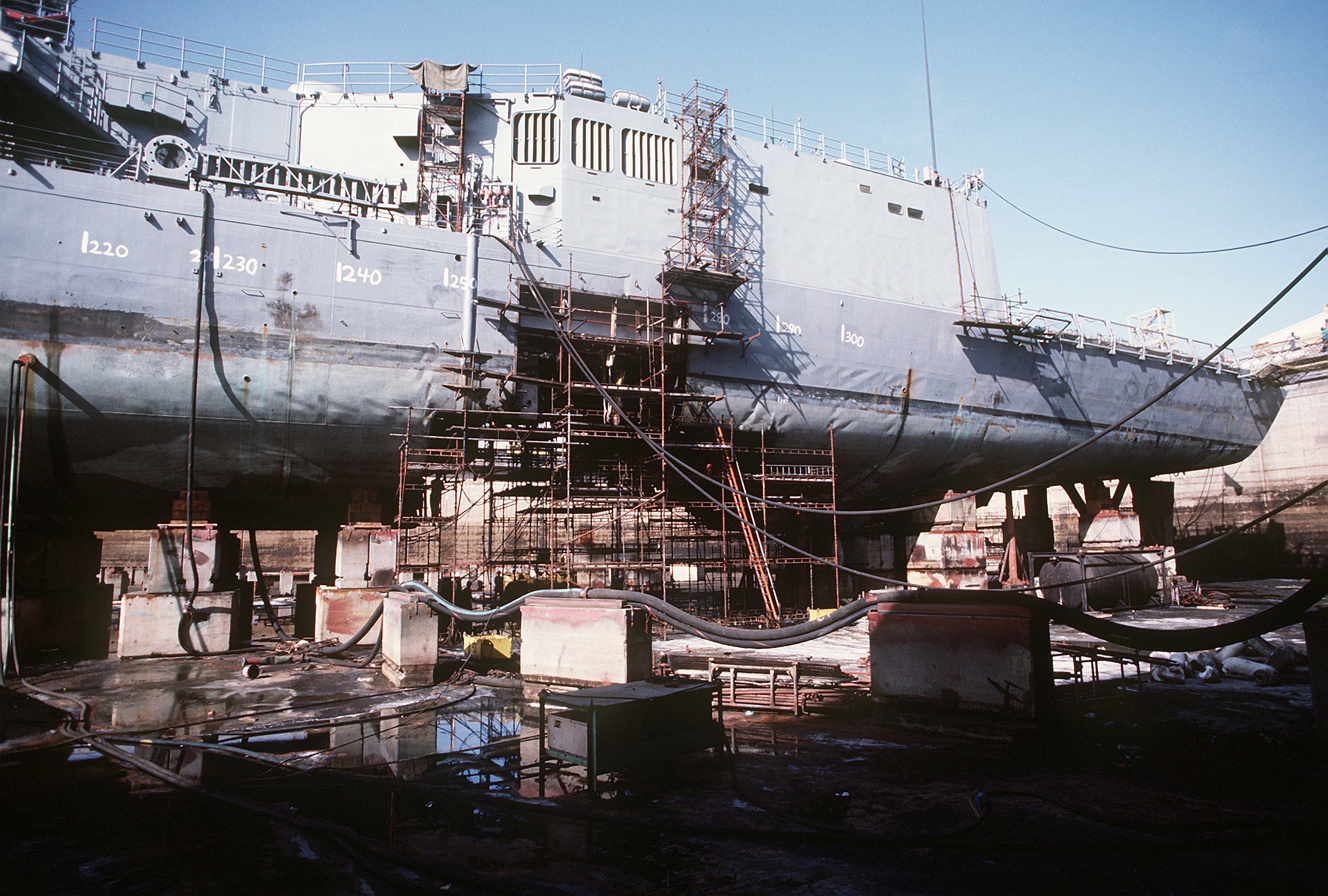
Mine-damaged USS Samuel B. Roberts in May 1988

USS Samuel B. Roberts was commissioned at Bath in 1986. It survived a mine explosion which tore a hole in its engine room and flooded two compartments. Over the next two years, BIW repaired the ship in unique fashion. The guided missile frigate was towed to the company's dry dock in Portland, Maine, and put up on blocks, where the damaged engine room was cut out of the ship. Meanwhile, workers in Bath built a 315-ton replacement, and the module was floated south to Portland, placed on the dry dock, slid into place under the frigate, jacked up, and welded into place.

In 1995, Bath Iron Works was bought by General Dynamics. In 2001, the company wrapped up a four-year effort to build the Land Level Transfer Facility, an enormous concrete platform for final assembly of its ships, instead of building them on a sloping way so that they could slide into the Kennebec at launch. Hulls are now moved by rail from the platform horizontally onto a moveable dry dock, which greatly reduced the work involved in building and launching the ships.

In 2015, Bath Iron Works signed contracts with US Navy to build new Arleigh Burke-class destroyers, as well as to conduct maintenance sustainment support of Independence-class littoral combat ships built by competitor Austal USA. The shipyard delivered USS Rafael Peralta, USS Thomas Hudner, USS Daniel Inouye, and USS Carl M. Levin. The DDG block buy for Bath also includes USS John Basilone, USS Harvey C. Barnum Jr., and USS Louis H. Wilson Jr.. On March 27, Bath received a $610.4 million contract modification to build John Basilone. This ship was funded in the 2015 defense appropriations act.

In 2016, Dirk Lesko became president of Bath Iron Works.

In 2020, 4,300 workers, all members of the International Association of Machinists and Aerospace Workers, voted to go on strike after the company and the union failed to agree to new labor contracts. The shipbuilders agreed to a 3-year pact and returned to work after 63 days of strike.

Lesko resigned unexpectedly on April 7, 2022, the same day the union local announced that it had come to an agreement with the shipyard. On May 5, 2022, Charles F. Krugh was appointed president.

== Offsite facilities ==
Bath Iron Works operates several offsite facilities in the surrounding mid-coast Maine region, their purposes range from administration to structural fabrication.

=== West Bath ===
• West Bath Warehouse • The facility closest to the main yard, located on 76 New Meadows Road, West Bath. Its primary responsibilities are storage and distribution of materials to other BIW facilities, primarily the main yard.

=== Brunswick ===
The neighboring town of Brunswick contains the most Bath Iron Works offsite facilities of any single municipality.

• Structural Fabrication • Built in 1940 under the name "Harding's Plant", the Structural Fabrication facility is among the largest outside of the main yard.

• Outfit Fabrication • Previously known as "East Brunswick Manufacturing Facility (EBMF)", the Outfit Fabrication facility is responsible for the production of non-structural parts and assemblies more efficient to build on the shop floor, and later ship into the main yard.

• Tech Center • The Tech Center is where many Planners, Designers, and Engineers work.

== Notable ships built ==
Aphrodite in 1899

- Yachts
  - SY Eleanor (1894) 803 ton steam yacht for W. A. Slater
  - Aphrodite completed for Oliver Hazard Payne 1899, the largest American built steam yacht at the time
  - Ranger, successful America's Cup defender
  - Aras II, Presidential Yacht known as USS Williamsburg
  - Corsair IV, large yacht built for J. P. Morgan Jr.
- Lightvessels
  - Diamond Shoal Lightship No. 71 (LV-71)
  - Nantucket Lightship 66
  - Nantucket Lightship 106
- Gunboat
  - USS Machias, Spanish–American War and World War I
- Naval ram
  - USS Katahdin
- Monitor
  - USS Nevada (BM-8)
- Denver class protected cruiser
  - USS Cleveland (C-19) World War I
- Virginia-class battleship
  - USS Georgia (BB-15), launched in 1904

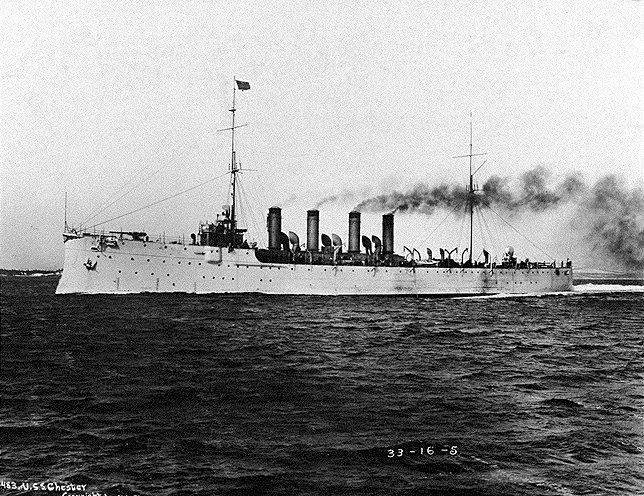
USS Chester (CL-1) was the first United States cruiser of the numbering series used through the first half of the 20th century.

- Chester-class cruiser
  - USS Chester (CL-1) World War I
- Smith-class destroyers
  - USS Flusser (DD-20) World War I
  - USS Reid (DD-21) World War I
- 5 of 21 Paulding-class destroyers
  - USS Paulding (DD-22) World War I – Rum Patrol
  - USS Drayton (DD-23) World War I
  - USS Trippe (DD-33) World War I – Rum Patrol
  - USS Jouett (DD-41) World War I – Rum Patrol
  - USS Jenkins (DD-42) World War I
- 2 of 4 Cassin-class destroyers
  - USS Cassin (DD-43) World War I – Rum Patrol
  - USS Cummings (DD-44) World War I – Rum Patrol
- 1 of 6 O'Brien-class destroyer
  - USS McDougal (DD-54) World War I – Rum Patrol
- 1 of 6 Tucker-class destroyer
  - USS Wadsworth (DD-60) World War I
- 2 of 6 Sampson-class destroyers
  - USS Davis (DD-65) World War I – Rum Patrol
  - USS Allen (DD-66) World War I – Attack on Pearl Harbor
- 1 of 6 Caldwell-class destroyer
  - USS Manley (DD-74) World War I – Guadalcanal campaign – Operation Flintlock – Battle of Saipan – Philippines campaign (1944–45)

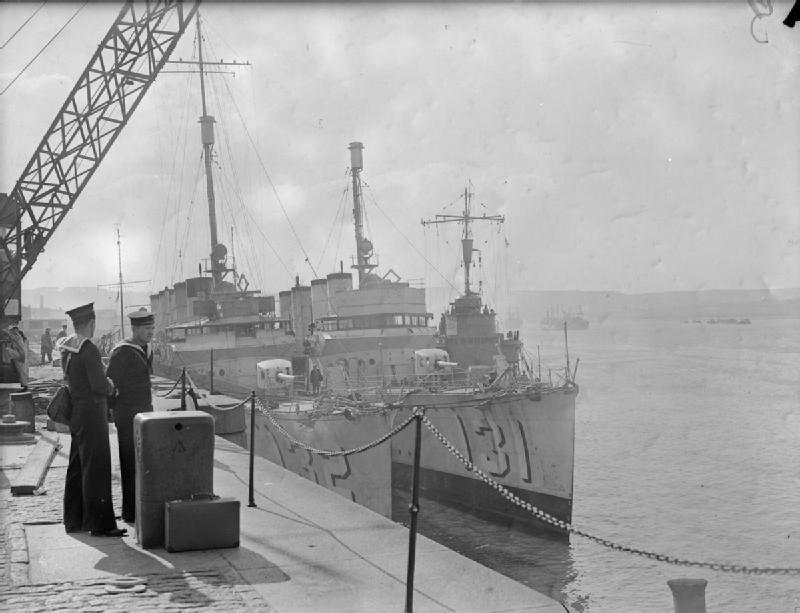
Two of the seven Bath Iron Works destroyers transferred to the Royal Navy in the Destroyers for Bases Agreement. The outboard ship made the St. Nazaire Raid.

- 8 of 111 Wickes-class destroyers
  - USS Wickes (DD-75) World War I – Destroyers for Bases Agreement
  - USS Philip (DD-76) World War I – Destroyers for Bases Agreement
  - USS Woolsey (DD-77) World War I
  - USS Evans (DD-78) Destroyers for Bases Agreement
  - USS Buchanan (DD-131) Destroyers for Bases Agreement – St. Nazaire Raid
  - USS Aaron Ward (DD-132) Destroyers for Bases Agreement
  - USS Hale (DD-133) Destroyers for Bases Agreement
  - USS Crowninshield (DD-134) Destroyers for Bases Agreement

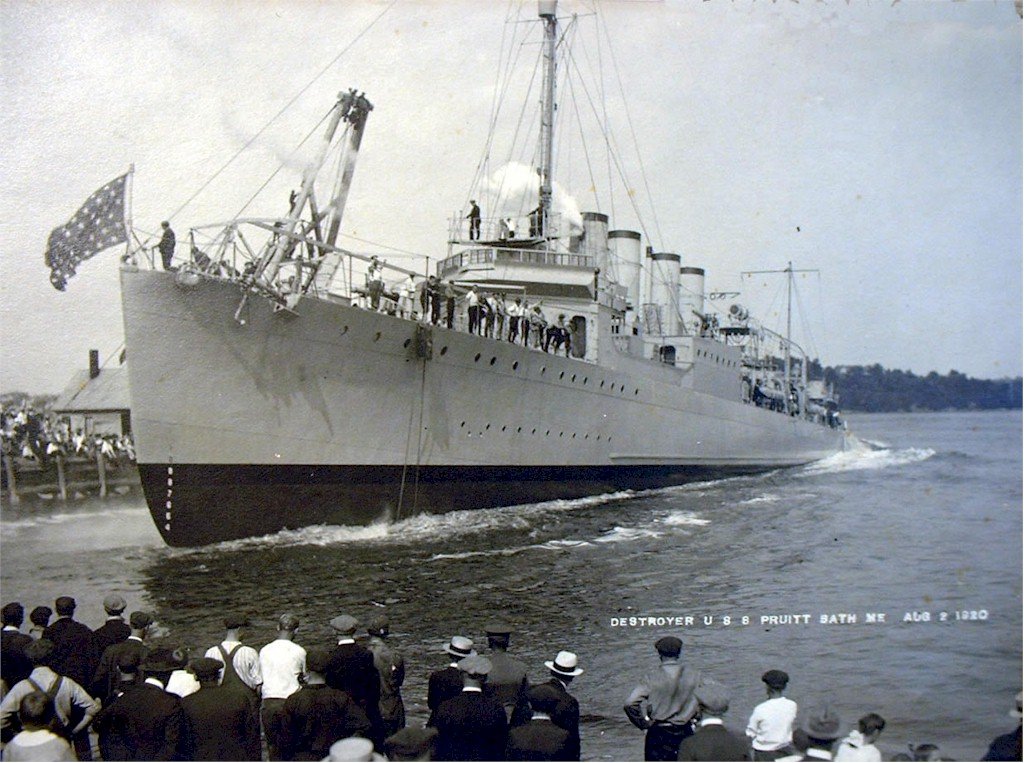
The last of the "four-stack" destroyers, USS Pruitt (DD-347) being launched from Bath Iron Works in 1920.

- 3 of 156 Clemson-class destroyers
  - USS Preble (DD-345) Attack on Pearl Harbor – Guadalcanal campaign
  - USS Sicard (DD-346) Attack on Pearl Harbor – Battle of Empress Augusta Bay
  - USS Pruitt (DD-347) Attack on Pearl Harbor

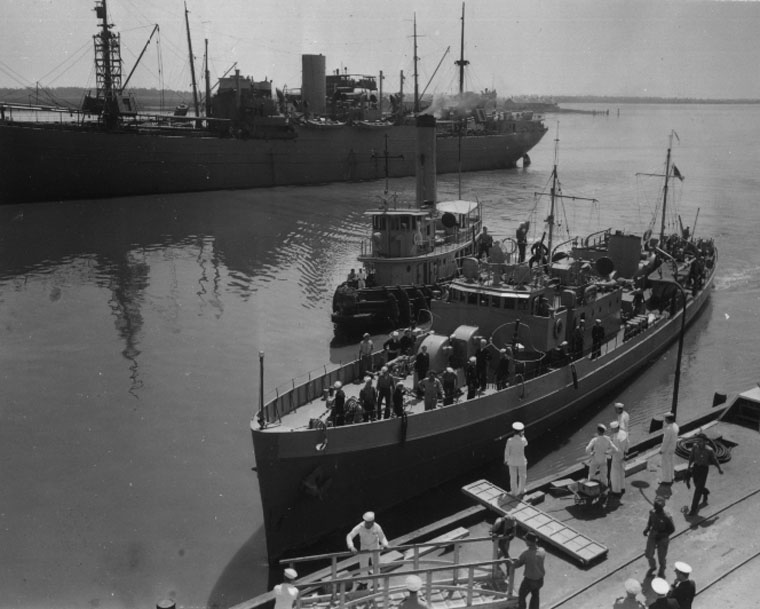
USCGC Icarus (WPC-110) delivers prisoners from U-352 to Charleston Navy Yard on 10 May 1942.

- Thetis-class patrol boat
  - USCGC Aurora (WPC-103)
  - USCGC Calypso (WPC-104)
  - USCGC Daphne (WPC-106)
  - USCGC Hermes (WPC-109)
  - USCGC Icarus (WPC-110) sank U-352
  - USCGC Perseus (WPC-114)
  - USCGC Thetis (WPC-115) sank U-157
- 1 of 8 Farragut-class destroyers (1934)
  - USS Dewey (DD-349) Attack on Pearl Harbor – Battle of the Coral Sea – Battle of Midway – Guadalcanal campaign – Battle of the Eastern Solomons – Battle of the Philippine Sea
- The J-class yacht Ranger, 1936
- 2 of 18 Mahan-class destroyers
  - USS Drayton (DD-366) Battle of Tassafaronga Philippines campaign (1944–45)
  - USS Lamson (DD-367) Battle of Tassafaronga – Philippines campaign (1944–45) – sunk in test Able of Operation Crossroads
- 3 of 6 Somers-class destroyers
  - USS Sampson (DD-394)
  - USS Davis (DD-395)
  - USS Jouett (DD-396) Invasion of Normandy
- 2 of 12 Sims-class destroyers
  - USS Sims (DD-409) Battle of the Coral Sea
  - USS Hughes (DD-410) Battle of Midway – Battle of the Santa Cruz Islands – Naval Battle of Guadalcanal – Philippines campaign (1944–45)
- 8 of 66 Gleaves-class destroyers
  - USS Gleaves (DD-423) invasions of Sicily, Italy and Southern France
  - USS Niblack (DD-424) invasions of Sicily, Italy and Southern France
  - USS Livermore (DD-429) invasions of North Africa and Southern France
  - USS Eberle (DD-430) invasions of North Africa and Southern France
  - USS Woolsey (DD-437) invasions of North Africa, Sicily and Italy
  - USS Ludlow (DD-438) invasions of North Africa, Sicily, Italy and Southern France
  - USS Emmons (DD-457) invasions of North Africa, Normandy, Southern France and Okinawa
  - USS Macomb (DD-458) invasions of North Africa, Southern France and Okinawa

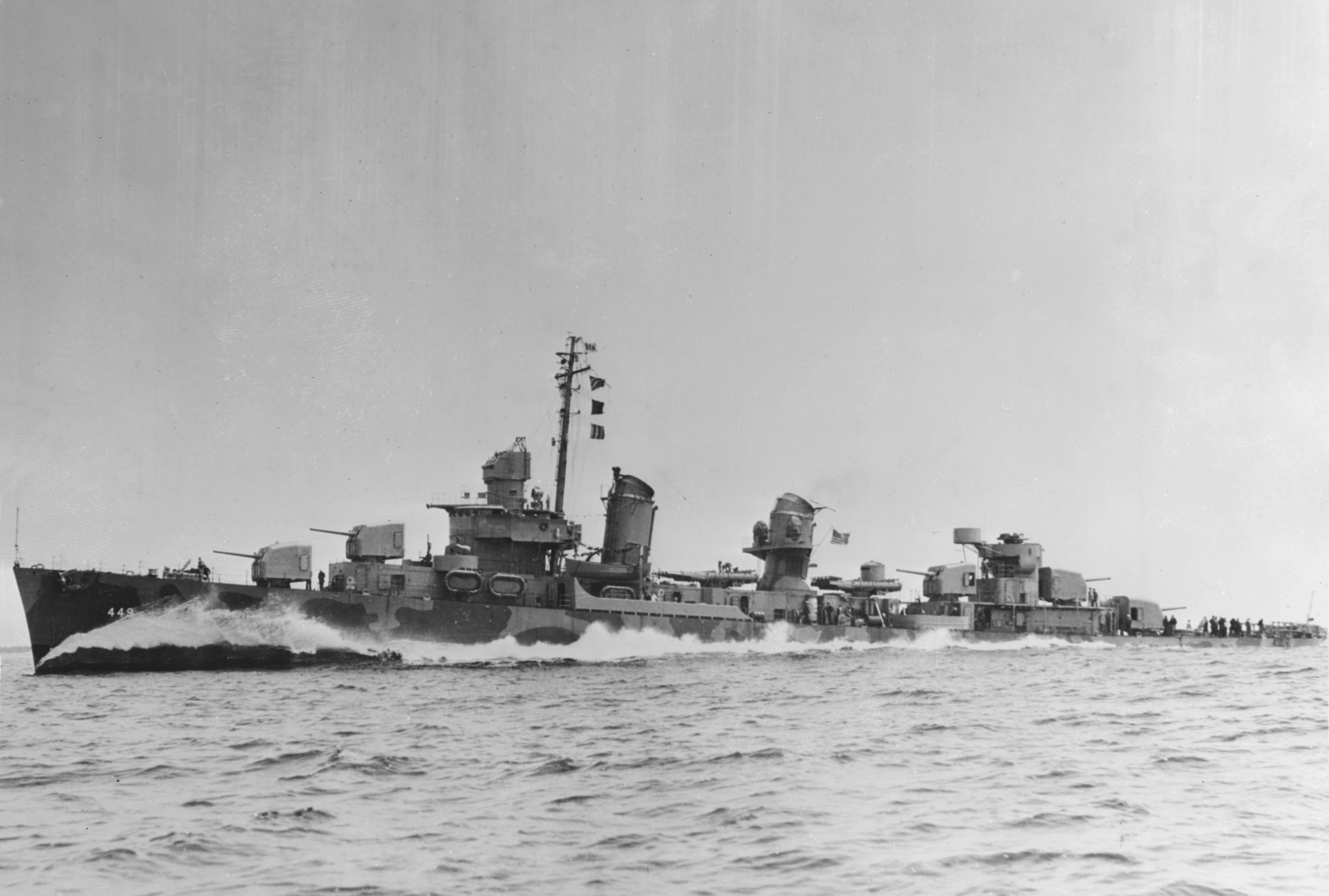
Nicholas holds the United States Navy record for battle stars with 16 from World War II, 5 from the Korean War and 9 from the Vietnam War

- 31 of 175 Fletcher-class destroyer
  - USS Nicholas (DD-449) Guadalcanal campaign – Philippines campaign (1944–45) – Korean War – Vietnam War
  - USS O'Bannon (DD-450) Naval Battle of Guadalcanal Guadalcanal campaign – Naval Battle of Vella Lavella – Philippines campaign (1944–45) – Korean War – Vietnam War
  - USS Chevalier (DD-451) Guadalcanal campaign – Naval Battle of Vella Lavella
  - USS Strong (DD-467) Guadalcanal campaign
  - USS Taylor (DD-468) Guadalcanal campaign – Philippines campaign (1944–45) – Korean War – Vietnam War
  - USS De Haven (DD-469) Guadalcanal campaign
  - USS Conway (DD-507) Guadalcanal campaign – Philippines campaign (1944–45) – Korean War
  - USS Cony (DD-508) Guadalcanal campaign – Philippines campaign (1944–45) – Battle of Surigao Strait – Korean War
  - USS Converse (DD-509) Guadalcanal campaign – Battle of Empress Augusta Bay Battle of Cape St. George – Battle of the Philippine Sea – Philippines campaign (1944–45)
  - USS Eaton (DD-510) Guadalcanal campaign – Philippines campaign (1944–45)
  - USS Foote (DD-511) Guadalcanal campaign – Battle of Empress Augusta Bay – Philippines campaign (1944–45) – Battle of Okinawa
  - USS Spence (DD-512) Guadalcanal campaign – Battle of Empress Augusta Bay – Battle of Cape St. George – Battle of the Philippine Sea – Philippines campaign (1944–45)
  - USS Terry (DD-513) Guadalcanal campaign – Battle of the Philippine Sea – Battle of Iwo Jima
  - USS Thatcher (DD-514) Guadalcanal campaign – Battle of Empress Augusta Bay – Battle of the Philippine Sea – Philippines campaign (1944–45) – Battle of Okinawa
  - USS Anthony (DD-515) Guadalcanal campaign – Battle of the Philippine Sea – Battle of Okinawa
  - USS Wadsworth (DD-516) Guadalcanal campaign – Battle of the Philippine Sea – Philippines campaign (1944–45) – Battle of Okinawa
  - USS Walker (DD-517) Philippines campaign (1944–45) – Battle of Okinawa – Korean War – Vietnam War
  - USS Abbot (DD-629) Philippines campaign (1944–45)
  - USS Braine (DD-630) Battle of the Philippine Sea – Philippines campaign (1944–45) – Battle of Okinawa
  - USS Erben (DD-631) Philippines campaign (1944–45) – Battle of Okinawa – Korean War
  - USS Hale (DD-642) Philippines campaign (1944–45) – Battle of Okinawa
  - USS Sigourney (DD-643) Guadalcanal campaign – Philippines campaign (1944–45) – Battle of Surigao Strait
  - USS Stembel (DD-644) Philippines campaign (1944–45) – Battle of Okinawa – Korean War
  - USS Caperton (DD-650) Battle of the Philippine Sea – Philippines campaign (1944–45)
  - USS Cogswell (DD-651) Battle of the Philippine Sea – Philippines campaign (1944–45) – Vietnam War
  - USS Ingersoll (DD-652) Mariana and Palau Islands Campaign – Philippines campaign (1944–45) – Battle of Okinawa – Vietnam War
  - USS Knapp (DD-653) Battle of the Philippine Sea – Philippines campaign (1944–45)
  - USS Remey (DD-688) Battle of Saipan – Philippines campaign (1944–45) – Battle of Surigao Strait – Battle of Okinawa
  - USS Wadleigh (DD-689) Battle of Saipan
  - USS Norman Scott (DD-690) Battle of Saipan
  - USS Mertz (DD-691) Philippines campaign (1944–45)
- 14 of 58 Allen M. Sumner-class destroyers
  - USS Barton (DD-722) Invasion of Normandy – Philippines campaign (1944–45) – Korean War
  - USS Walke (DD-723) Invasion of Normandy – Philippines campaign (1944–45) – Battle of Okinawa – Korean War – Vietnam War
  - USS Laffey (DD-724) Invasion of Normandy – Philippines campaign (1944–45) – Battle of Okinawa – Korean War – preserved National Historic Landmark in Charleston, South Carolina
  - USS O'Brien (DD-725) Invasion of Normandy – Philippines campaign (1944–45) – Korean War – Vietnam War
  - USS Meredith (DD-726) Invasion of Normandy
  - USS De Haven (DD-727) Philippines campaign (1944–45) – Battle of Okinawa – Korean War
  - USS Mansfield (DD-728) Philippines campaign (1944–45) – Korean War – Vietnam War
  - USS Lyman K. Swenson (DD-729) Philippines campaign (1944–45) – Battle of Okinawa – Korean War – Vietnam War
  - USS Collett (DD-730) Philippines campaign (1944–45) – Korean War
  - USS Maddox (DD-731) Battle of Okinawa – Korean War – Gulf of Tonkin Incident – Vietnam War
  - USS Hyman (DD-732) Battle of Okinawa – Korean War
  - USS Mannert L. Abele (DD-733) Battle of Okinawa
  - USS Purdy (DD-734) Battle of Okinawa – Korean War
  - USS Drexler (DD-741) Battle of Okinawa

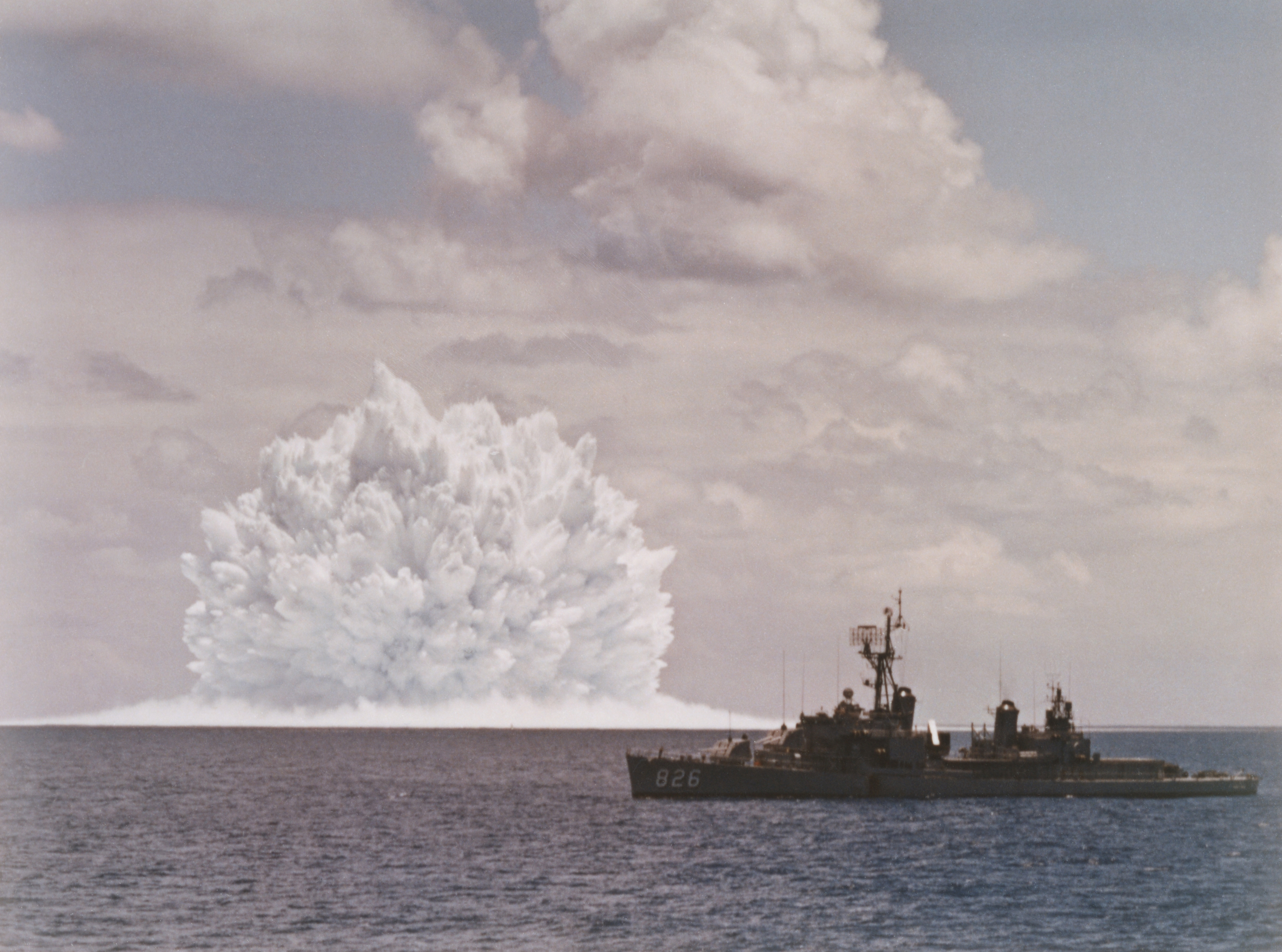
Agerholm launched an ASROC anti-submarine rocket armed with a nuclear depth bomb during the Dominic Swordfish (1962)

- 6 of 12 Robert H. Smith-class destroyers
  - USS Robert H. Smith (DM-23) Battle of Okinawa
  - USS Thomas E. Fraser (DM-24) Battle of Okinawa
  - USS Shannon (DM-25) Battle of Okinawa
  - USS Harry F. Bauer (DM-26) Battle of Okinawa
  - USS Adams (DM-27) Battle of Okinawa
  - USS Tolman (DM-28) Battle of Okinawa
- 30 of 98 Gearing-class destroyers
  - USS Frank Knox (DD-742) World War II – Korean War – Vietnam War
  - USS Southerland (DD-743) World War II – Korean War – Vietnam War
  - USS Chevalier (DD-805) Korean War
  - USS Higbee (DD-806) World War II – Korean War – Vietnam War – Battle of Dong Hoi
  - USS Benner (DD-807) World War II – Vietnam War
  - USS Dennis J. Buckley (DD-808) Vietnam War
  - USS Agerholm (DD-826) Korean War – Vietnam War
  - USS Robert A. Owens (DD-827)
  - USS Timmerman (DD-828) (Experimental ship completed with aluminum superstructure and high-horsepower engines)
  - USS Myles C. Fox (DD-829) Vietnam War
  - USS Everett F. Larson (DD-830) Vietnam War
  - USS Goodrich (DD-831)
  - USS Hanson (DD-832) Korean War – Vietnam War
  - USS Herbert J. Thomas (DD-833) Korean War – Vietnam War
  - USS Turner (DD-834)
  - USS Charles P. Cecil (DD-835) Vietnam War
  - USS George K. MacKenzie (DD-836) Korean War – Vietnam War
  - USS Sarsfield (DD-837) Vietnam War
  - USS Ernest G. Small (DD-838) Korean War
  - USS Power (DD-839) Vietnam War
  - USS Glennon (DD-840)
  - USS Noa (DD-841) Recovered astronaut John Glenn in Friendship 7 on 20 February 1962
  - USS Fiske (DD-842) Korean War – Vietnam War
  - USS Warrington (DD-843)
  - USS Perry (DD-844) Vietnam War
  - USS Bausell (DD-845) Korean War – Vietnam War
  - USS Ozbourn (DD-846) Korean War – Vietnam War
  - USS Robert L. Wilson (DD-847) Vietnam War
  - USS Witek (DD-848) (no overseas deployments – used exclusively for ASW research)
  - USS Richard E. Kraus (DD-849) Vietnam War
- 3 of 13 Dealey-class destroyer escorts
  - USS Dealey (DE-1006)
  - USS Cromwell (DE-1014)
  - USS Hammerberg (DE-1015)

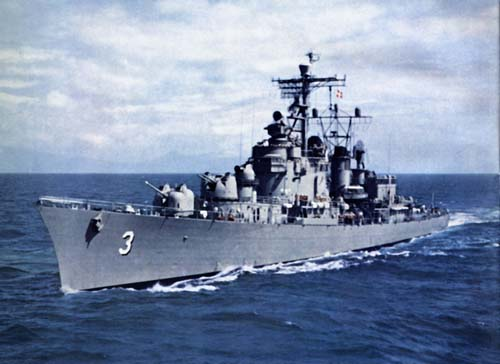
The second Cold War destroyer built by Bath Iron Works was named for the grandfather of Republican senator and 2008 presidential candidate John S. McCain III.

- 2 of 4 Mitscher-class destroyers
  - USS Mitscher (DL-2)
  - USS John S. McCain (DL-3) Vietnam War
- 9 of 18 Forrest Sherman-class destroyers
  - USS Forrest Sherman (DD-931)
  - USS John Paul Jones (DD-932)
  - USS Barry (DD-933) Vietnam War
  - USS Manley (DD-940) Vietnam War
  - USS Dupont (DD-941)
  - USS Bigelow (DD-942) Vietnam War
  - USS Hull (DD-945) Vietnam War
  - USS Edson (DD-946) Vietnam War
  - USS Somers (DD-947) Vietnam War
- 4 of 23 Charles F. Adams-class destroyers
  - USS Charles F. Adams (DDG-2)
  - USS John King (DDG-3)
  - USS Sampson (DDG-10)
  - USS Sellers (DDG-11)
  - D185 Lütjens
  - D186 Mölders
  - D187 Rommel
- 2 of 10 Farragut-class destroyers (1958)
  - USS Dewey (DDG-45)
  - USS Preble (DDG-46) Vietnam War
- 3 of 9 Leahy-class cruisers
  - USS Leahy (CG-16)
  - USS Harry E. Yarnell (CG-17)
  - USS Worden (CG-18) Vietnam War
- 5 of 9 Belknap-class cruisers
  - USS Belknap (CG-26)
  - USS Josephus Daniels (CG-27)
  - USS Wainwright (CG-28) Vietnam War
  - USS William H. Standley (CG-32) Vietnam War
  - USS Biddle (CG-34) Vietnam War
- 1 of 11 Garcia-class frigates
  - USS Glover (FF-1098)
- 3 of 6 Brooke-class frigates
  - USS Talbot (FFG-4)
  - USS Richard L. Page (FFG-5)
  - USS Julius A. Furer (FFG-6)
- 24 of 71 Oliver Hazard Perry-class frigates
  - USS Oliver Hazard Perry (FFG-7)
  - USS McInerney (FFG-8)
  - USS Clark (FFG-11)
  - USS Samuel Eliot Morison (FFG-13)
  - USS Estocin (FFG-15)
  - USS Clifton Sprague (FFG-16)
  - USS Flatley (FFG-21)
  - USS Jack Williams (FFG-24)
  - USS Gallery (FFG-26)
  - USS Stephen W. Groves (FFG-29)
  - USS John L. Hall (FFG-32)
  - USS Aubrey Fitch (FFG-34)
  - USS Underwood (FFG-36)
  - USS Doyle (FFG-39)
  - USS Klakring (FFG-42)
  - USS Dewert (FFG-45)
  - USS Nicholas (FFG-47)
  - USS Robert G. Bradley (FFG-49)
  - USS Taylor (FFG-50)
  - USS Hawes (FFG-53)
  - USS Elrod (FFG-55)
  - USS Simpson (FFG-56)
  - USS Samuel B. Roberts (FFG-58), launched in 1984 and repaired after being punctured by a mine in 1988
  - USS Kauffman (FFG-59)
- 8 of 27 Ticonderoga-class cruisers
  - USS Thomas S. Gates (CG-51)
  - USS Philippine Sea (CG-58)
  - USS Normandy (CG-60)
  - USS Monterey (CG-61)
  - USS Cowpens (CG-63)
  - USS Gettysburg (CG-64)
  - USS Shiloh (CG-67)
  - USS Lake Erie (CG-70), 21 Feb 2008 shot down the errant USA 193 satellite with a modified SM3 missile.
- Arleigh Burke-class destroyers
  - USS Arleigh Burke (DDG-51), commissioned July 4, 1991.
  - USS John Paul Jones (DDG-53)
  - USS Curtis Wilbur (DDG-54)
  - USS John S. McCain (DDG-56)
  - USS Laboon (DDG-58)
  - USS Paul Hamilton (DDG-60)
  - USS Fitzgerald (DDG-62)
  - USS Carney (DDG-64)
  - USS Gonzalez (DDG-66)
  - USS The Sullivans (DDG-68)
  - USS Hopper (DDG-70)
  - USS Mahan (DDG-72)
  - USS Decatur (DDG-73)
  - USS Donald Cook (DDG-75)
  - USS Higgins (DDG-76)
  - USS O'Kane (DDG-77)
  - USS Oscar Austin (DDG-79)
  - USS Winston S. Churchill (DDG-81)
  - USS Howard (DDG-83)
  - USS McCampbell (DDG-85)
  - USS Mason (DDG-87)
  - USS Chafee (DDG-90)
  - USS Momsen (DDG-92)
  - USS Nitze (DDG-94)
  - USS Bainbridge (DDG-96), launched in 2005
  - USS Farragut (DDG-99)
  - USS Gridley (DDG-101), launched in 2006
  - USS Sampson (DDG-102)
  - USS Sterett (DDG-104)
  - USS Stockdale (DDG-106)
  - USS Wayne E. Meyer (DDG-108)
  - USS Jason Dunham (DDG 109)
  - USS Spruance (DDG-111)
  - USS Michael Murphy (DDG-112)
  - USS Rafael Peralta (DDG-115)
  - USS Thomas Hudner (DDG-116)
  - USS Daniel Inouye (DDG-118)
  - USS Carl M. Levin (DDG-120)
  - USS John Basilone (DDG-122)
  - USS Harvey C. Barnum Jr. (DDG-124)
  - USS Louis H. Wilson Jr. (DDG-126)
  - USS Patrick Gallagher (DDG-127)
  - USS William Charette (DDG-130)
  - USS Quentin Walsh (DDG 132)
  - USS John E. Kilmer (DDG 134)
  - USS Richard G. Lugar (DDG 136)
  - USS J. William Middendorf (DDG 138)
  - USS Thomas G. Kelley (DDG 140)
  - USS Michael G. Mullen (DDG 144)
  - USS Kyle Carpenter
- Zumwalt-class destroyers
  - USS Zumwalt (DDG-1000)
  - USS Michael Monsoor (DDG-1001)
  - USS Lyndon B. Johnson (DDG-1002)
