= Louis H. Wilson Jr. =

United States Marine Corps general

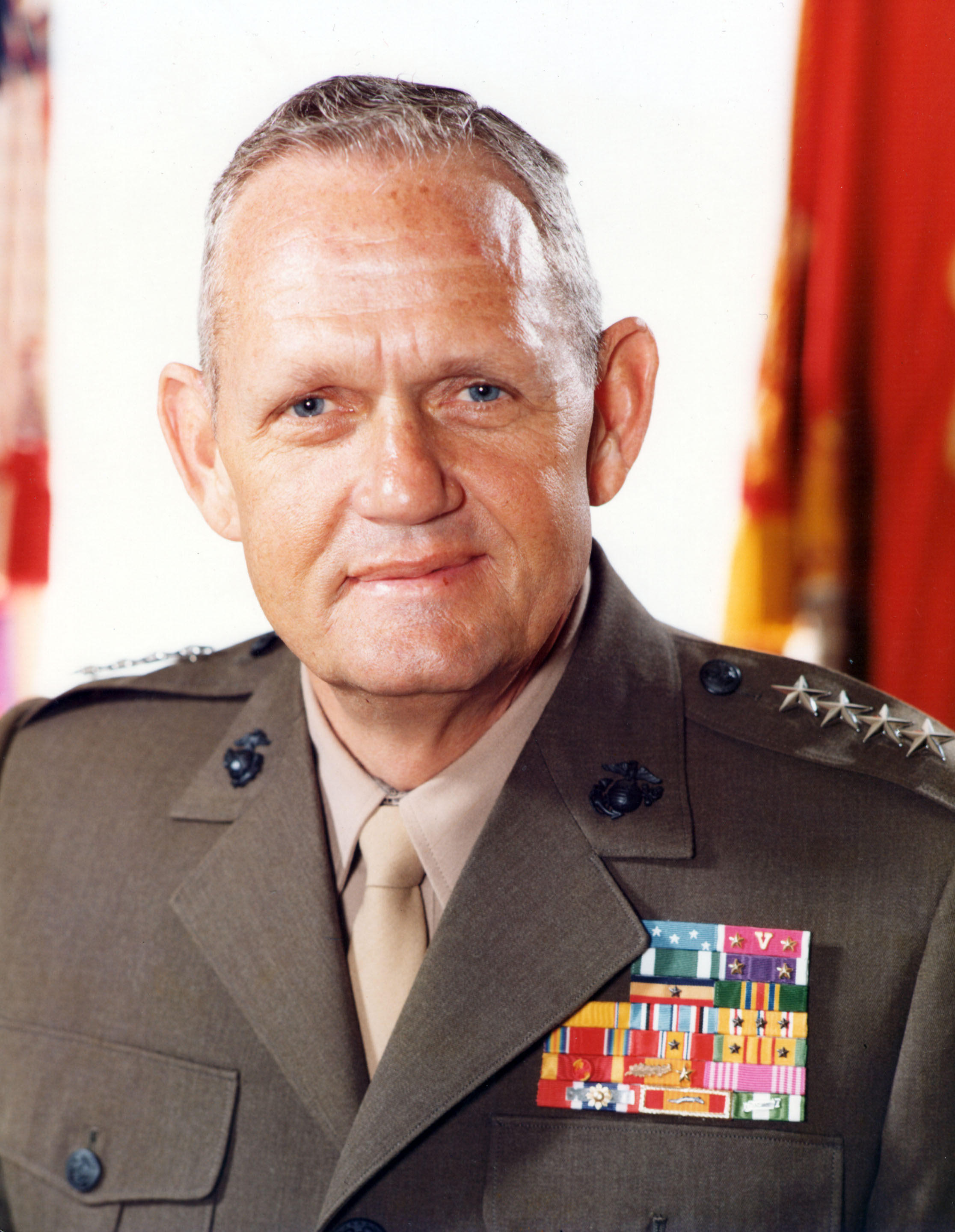
- General Louis H. Wilson Jr.
- Born: February 11, 1920; Brandon, Mississippi, U.S.
- Died: June 21, 2005 (aged 85); Birmingham, Alabama, U.S.
- Burial place: Arlington National Cemetery
- Military career
- Allegiance: United States
- Branch: United States Marine Corps
- Service years: 1941–1979
- Rank: General
- Commands: Commandant of the Marine Corps; I Marine Amphibious Force; 6th Marine Corps District; The Basic School; 2nd Battalion, 5th Marines
- Conflicts: World War II: Battle of Guam; Vietnam War
- Awards: Medal of Honor; Defense Distinguished Service Medal (2); Legion of Merit (3); Purple Heart (3); Navy and Marine Corps Commendation Medal

Louis Hugh Wilson Jr. (February 11, 1920 – June 21, 2005) was a United States Marine Corps four-star general and a World War II recipient of the Medal of Honor for his actions during the Battle of Guam. He served as the 26th commandant of the Marine Corps from 1975 until his retirement from the Marine Corps in 1979, after 38 years of service.

== Early life ==
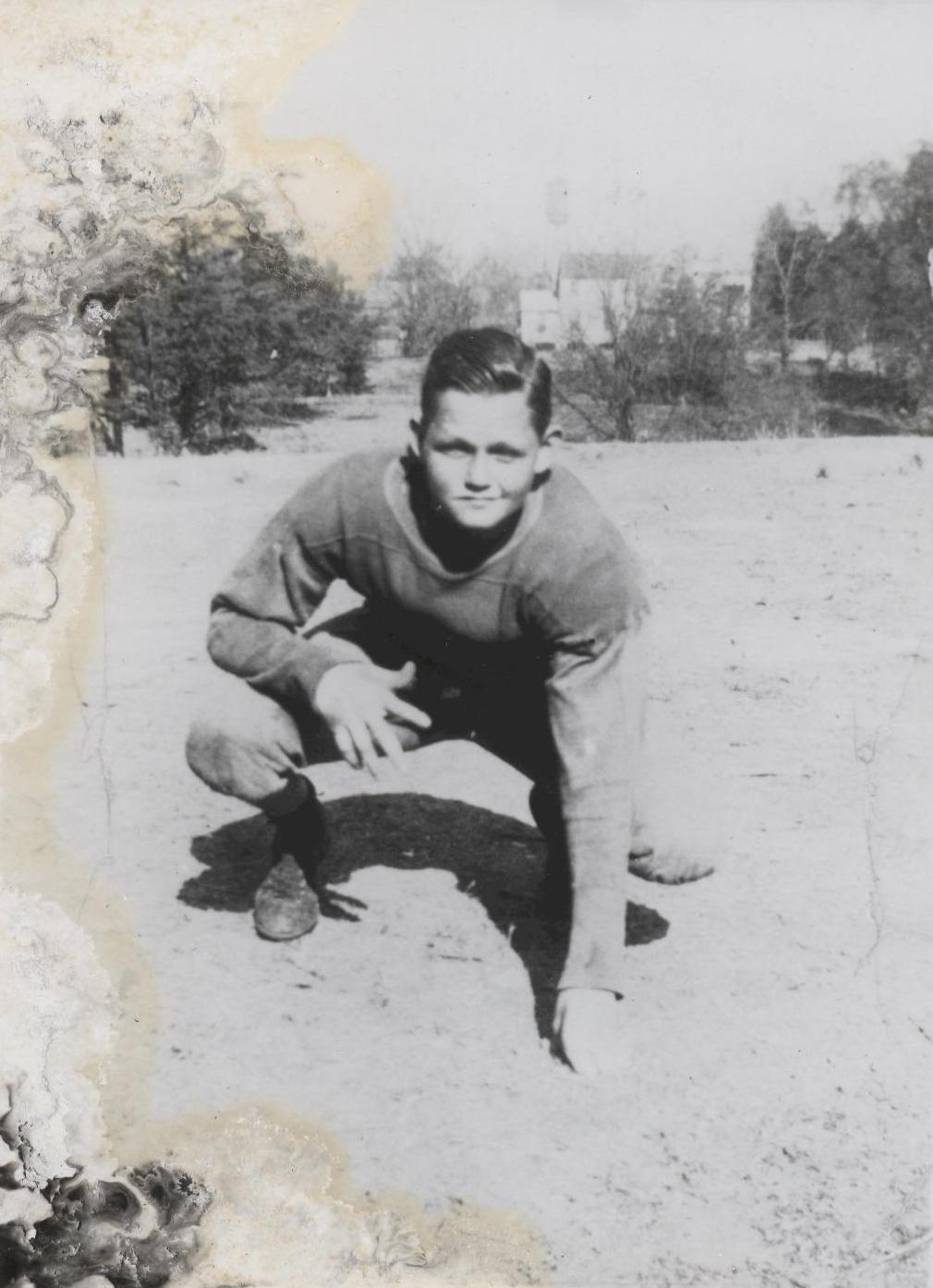
Wilson in Football Uniform, circa 1930.

Wilson was born on February 11, 1920, in Brandon, Mississippi. He earned a Bachelor of Arts degree in 1941 from Millsaps College in Jackson, Mississippi, where he participated in football and track. Wilson was also an active member of the Alpha Iota chapter of Pi Kappa Alpha fraternity, initiated on February 23, 1939.

He has many relatives residing in Mississippi to this day.

== Military career ==
Wilson enlisted in the Marine Corps Reserve in May 1941 and was commissioned a second lieutenant in November of that year. After attending officers' basic training, he was assigned to the 9th Marine Regiment at Marine Corps Base, San Diego, California.

=== World War II ===
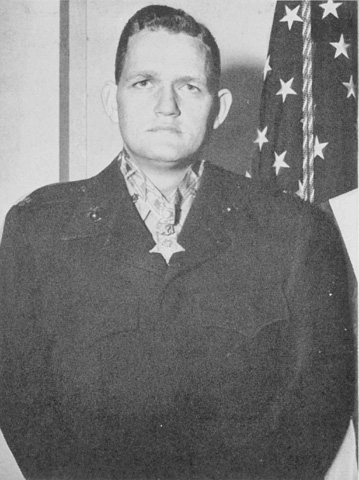
Wilson as a captain receives his Medal of Honor

Wilson was deployed to the Pacific theater with the 9th Marines in February 1943, making stops at Guadalcanal, Efate, and Bougainville. He was promoted to captain in April 1943. During the Battle of Guam on July 25–26, 1944, while commanding Company F, 2nd Battalion, 9th Marines, Wilson earned the nation's highest honor for heroism in combat, the Medal of Honor, when he and his company repelled and destroyed a numerically superior enemy force. Because of wounds received, he was evacuated to the United States Naval Hospital, San Diego, where he remained until October 16, 1944.

Wilson returned to duty as commanding officer, Company D, Marine Barracks, Camp Pendleton, California. In December 1944, he was transferred to Washington, D.C., where he served as detachment commander at the Marine Barracks. While in Washington, he was presented the Medal of Honor by President Harry S. Truman. He was promoted to major in March 1945.

=== 1946 to 1965 ===
From June 1946 until August 1951, Wilson had consecutive tours as dean and assistant director, Marine Corps Institute; aide-de-camp to the commanding general, Fleet Marine Force (FMF), Pacific; and officer in charge, District Headquarters Recruiting Station, New York City.

Promoted to lieutenant colonel in November 1951, while stationed at Quantico, Virginia, Wilson served consecutively as commanding officer of The Basic School's 1st Training Battalion; commanding officer of Camp Barrett; and executive officer of The Basic School. He completed the Officer's Senior Course in August 1954.

After a brief tour as a senior school instructor, Marine Corps Schools, Quantico, Wilson departed for Korea to serve as assistant G-3, 1st Marine Division. In August 1955, he returned to the United States with the 1st Division, and was appointed commanding officer, 2nd Battalion, 5th Marines, 1st Marine Division. In March 1956, Wilson was assigned to Headquarters Marine Corps (HQMC), serving two years as head, Operations Section, G-3 Division. He then returned to Quantico, first as commanding officer of the Test and Training Regiment, and later as commanding officer of The Basic School.

In June 1962, after graduation from the National War College, Wilson was assigned as joint plans coordinator to the deputy chief of staff (plans and programs), HQMC.

=== Vietnam War ===
Wilson transferred to the 1st Marine Division and deployed with the division in August 1965, stopping at Okinawa before going to Vietnam. As assistant chief of staff, G-3, 1st Marine Division, he was awarded the Legion of Merit and the Republic of Vietnam Cross of Gallantry with Gold Star.

=== 1966 to 1975 ===
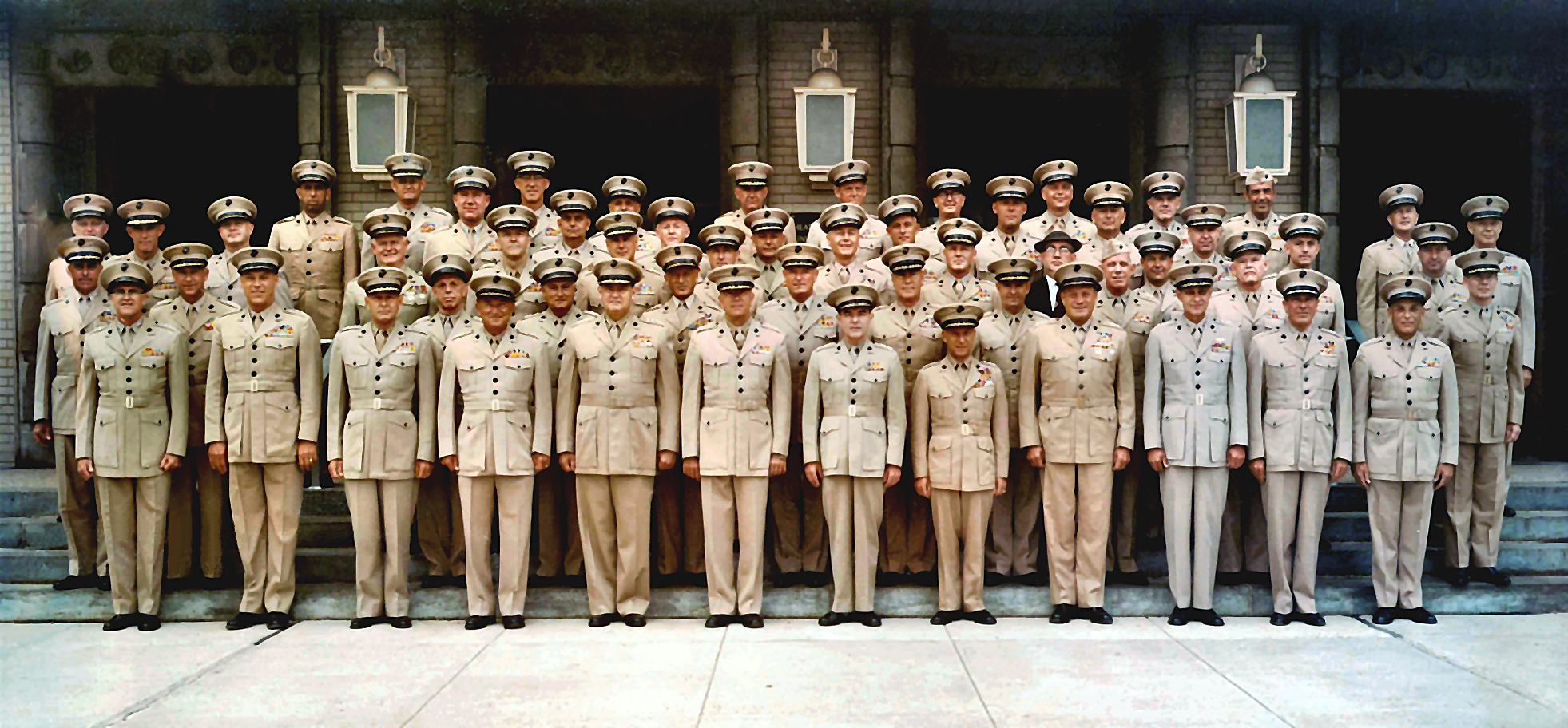
Wilson as a brigadier general at the 1967 General Officers Symposium (2nd from left, top row)

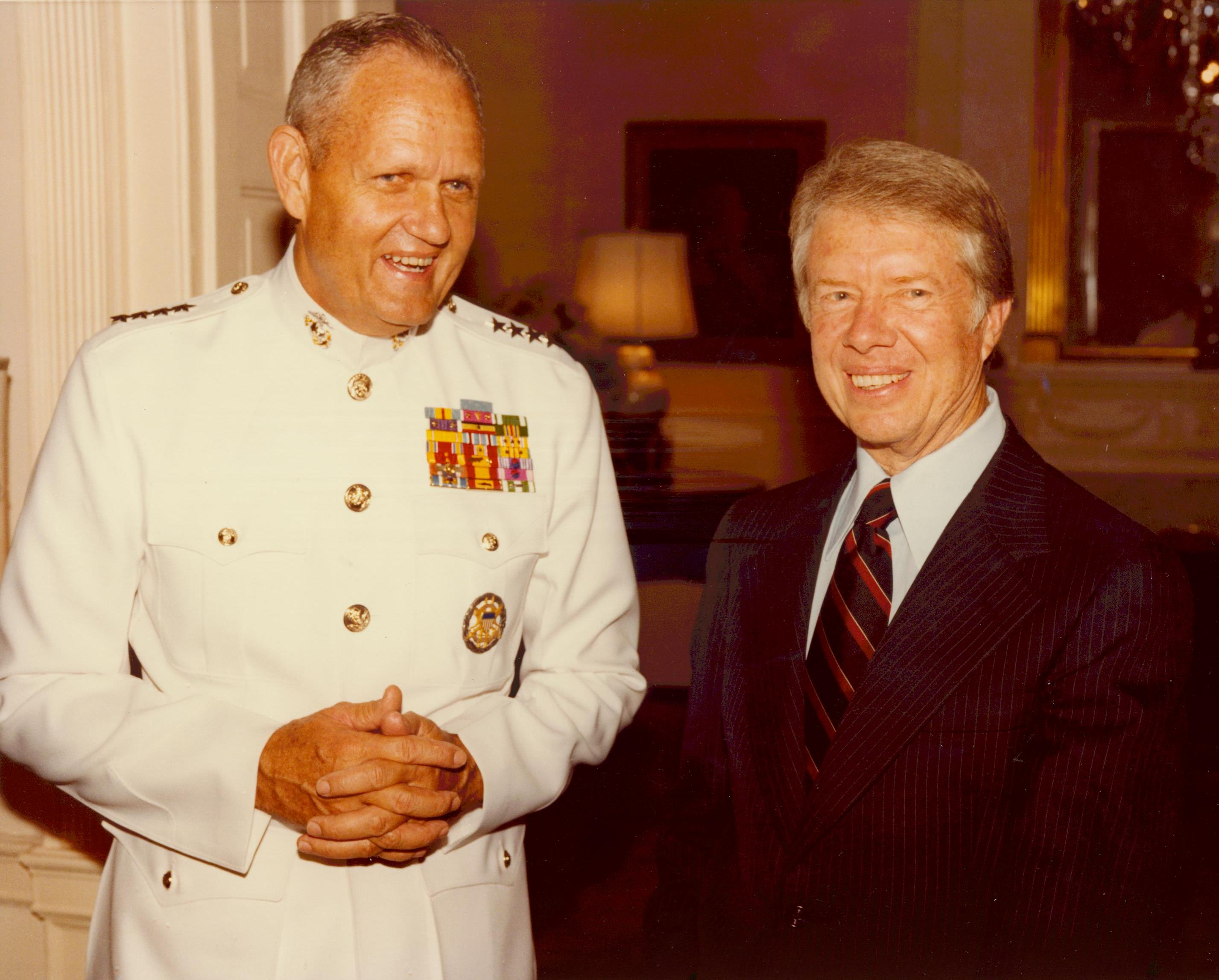
Wilson with President Jimmy Carter in August 1978.

Upon his return to the United States in August 1966, Wilson assumed command of the 6th Marine Corps District, Atlanta, Georgia. Promoted to brigadier general in November 1966, he was assigned to HQMC in January 1967, as legislative assistant to the commandant of the Marine Corps until July 1968. He then served as chief of staff, Headquarters, Fleet Marine Force, Pacific, until March 1970, earning a second Legion of Merit.

Wilson was advanced to the grade of major general in March 1970 and assumed command of I Marine Amphibious Force, 3rd Marine Division on Okinawa, where he was awarded a third Legion of Merit for his service.

In April 1971, Wilson returned to Quantico for duty as deputy for education/director, Education Center, Marine Corps Development and Education Command. He was promoted to lieutenant general in August 1972 and on September 1, 1972, assumed command of Fleet Marine Force, Pacific. During that tour, Wilson was presented the Korean Order of National Security Merit, Guk-Seon Medal, 2d Class and the Philippine Legion of Honor (Degree of Commander) for his service to those countries.

=== Commandant of the Marine Corps ===
Wilson was promoted to general on July 1, 1975, when he assumed the office of Commandant of the Marine Corps. As commandant, Wilson repeatedly stressed modernization of the post-Vietnam Marine Corps. He insisted on force readiness, responsiveness, and mobility by maintaining fast-moving, hard-hitting expeditionary units, each consisting of a single integrated system of modern ground- and air-delivered firepower, tactical mobility, and electronic countermeasures. Wilson was the first Marine Corps commandant to serve full-time on the Joint Chiefs of Staff.

== Awards and decorations ==
Wilson was the recipient of the following awards:

1st Row	Medal of Honor		Defense Distinguished Service Medal w/ Bronze oak leaf cluster	Legion of Merit w/ valor device & 2 award stars	Office of the Joint Chiefs of Staff Identification Badge
2nd Row	Purple Heart w/ 2 award stars	Navy and Marine Corps Commendation Medal	Navy Presidential Unit Citation w/ 1 service star	Navy Meritorious Unit Commendation	Office of the Joint Chiefs of Staff Identification Badge
3rd Row	American Defense Service Medal	American Campaign Medal	Asiatic-Pacific Campaign Medal w/ 3 service stars	World War II Victory Medal	Office of the Joint Chiefs of Staff Identification Badge
4th Row	National Defense Service Medal w/ 1 service star	Vietnam Service Medal w/ 2 service stars	National Order of Vietnam, Officer degree	Vietnam Gallantry Cross w/ palm & gold star	Office of the Joint Chiefs of Staff Identification Badge
5th Row	Korean Order of National Security Merit, Gugseon Medal	Philippine Legion of Honor, rank of Commander	Vietnam Gallantry Cross unit citation	Vietnam Campaign Medal	Office of the Joint Chiefs of Staff Identification Badge

=== Medal of Honor citation ===
The President of the United States takes pleasure in presenting the MEDAL OF HONOR to CAPTAIN LOUIS H. WILSON, JR.
UNITED STATES MARINE CORPS for service as set forth in the following CITATION:

For conspicuous gallantry and intrepidity at the risk of his life above and beyond the call of duty as Commanding Officer of Company F, Second Battalion, Ninth Marines, Third Marine Division, in action against enemy Japanese forces at Fonte Hill, Guam, Marianas Islands, 25 and July 26, 1944. Ordered to take that portion of the hill within his zone of action, Captain Wilson initiated his attack in midafternoon, pushed up the rugged, open terrain against terrific machine-gun and rifle fire for 300 yards and successfully captured the objective. Promptly assuming command of other disorganized units and motorized equipment in addition to his own company and one reinforcing platoon, he organized his night defenses in the face of continuous hostile fire and, although wounded three times during this five-hour period, completed his disposition of men and guns before retiring to the company command post for medical attention. Shortly thereafter, when the enemy launched the first of a series of savage counterattacks lasting all night, he voluntarily rejoined his besieged units and repeatedly exposed himself to the merciless hail of shrapnel and bullets, dashing fifty yards into the open on one occasion to rescue a wounded Marine lying helpless beyond the front lines. Fighting fiercely in hand-to-hand encounters, he led his men in furiously waged battle for approximately ten hours, tenaciously holding his line and repelling the fanatically renewed counterthrusts until he succeeded in crushing the last efforts of the hard-pressed Japanese early the following morning. Then, organizing a seventeen-man patrol, he immediately advanced upon a strategic slope essential to the security of his position and, boldly defying intense mortar, machine-gun and rifle fire which struck down thirteen of his men, drove relentlessly forward with the remnants of his patrol to seize the vital ground. By his indomitable leadership, daring combat tactics and dauntless valor in the face of overwhelming odds, Captain Wilson succeeded in capturing and holding the strategic high ground in his regimental sector, thereby contributing essentially to the success of his regimental mission and to the annihilation of 350 Japanese troops. His inspiring conduct throughout the critical periods of this decisive action enhanced and sustained the highest traditions of the United States Naval Service. /S/ HARRY S. TRUMAN

== Post-military ==
Wilson retired on June 30, 1979, and returned to his home in Mississippi. For "exceptionally distinguished service" during his four-year tenure as commandant, and his contributions as a member of the Joint Chiefs of Staff, he received the Defense Distinguished Service Medal (first oak leaf cluster), upon retirement.

Wilson died at his home in Birmingham, Alabama, on June 21, 2005. As with all former Marine Corps commandants, in accordance with Article 1288 of Navy Regulations, all ships and stations of the Department of the Navy flew the national flag at half-mast from the time of Wilson's death until sunset of the date of interment. Wilson was buried with full military honors in Arlington National Cemetery on July 19, 2005.

== Honors ==
- Wilson Boulevard and Wilson Gate in Camp Lejeune, North Carolina.
- Wilson Hall, the headquarters building for Marine Corps Officer Candidates School, in Quantico, Virginia.
- USS Louis H. Wilson Jr. (DDG 126).
- Louis Wilson Drive in Brandon, Mississippi.
- Golden Plate Award of the American Academy of Achievement in 1977.

== See also ==
- List of Medal of Honor recipients

== Notes ==
Military offices
Preceded by Robert Everton Cushman Jr.	Commandant of the Marine Corps; 1975–1979	Succeeded by Robert H. Barrow
