= USS John Basilone =

Arleigh Burke-class destroyer

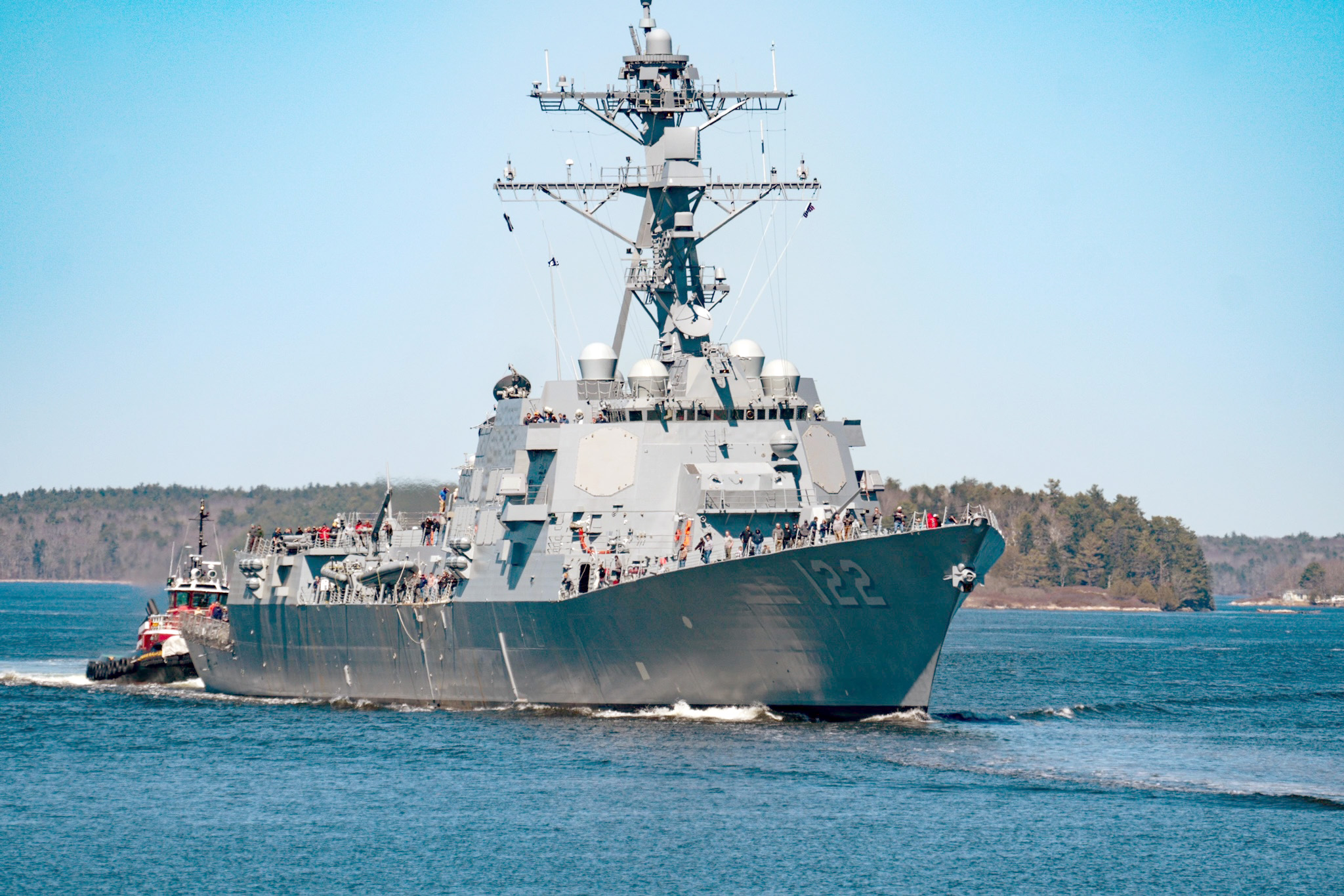
- PCU John Basilone on 8 April 2024

History

United States
- Name: John Basilone
- Namesake: John Basilone
- Awarded: 3 June 2013
- Builder: Bath Iron Works
- Laid down: 10 January 2020
- Launched: 12 June 2022
- Sponsored by: Ryan Manion; Amy Looney
- Christened: 18 June 2022
- Commissioned: 9 November 2024
- Home port: Mayport, Florida
- Identification: Hull number: DDG-122
- Motto: Honor Loyalty Sacrifice
- Status: In active service
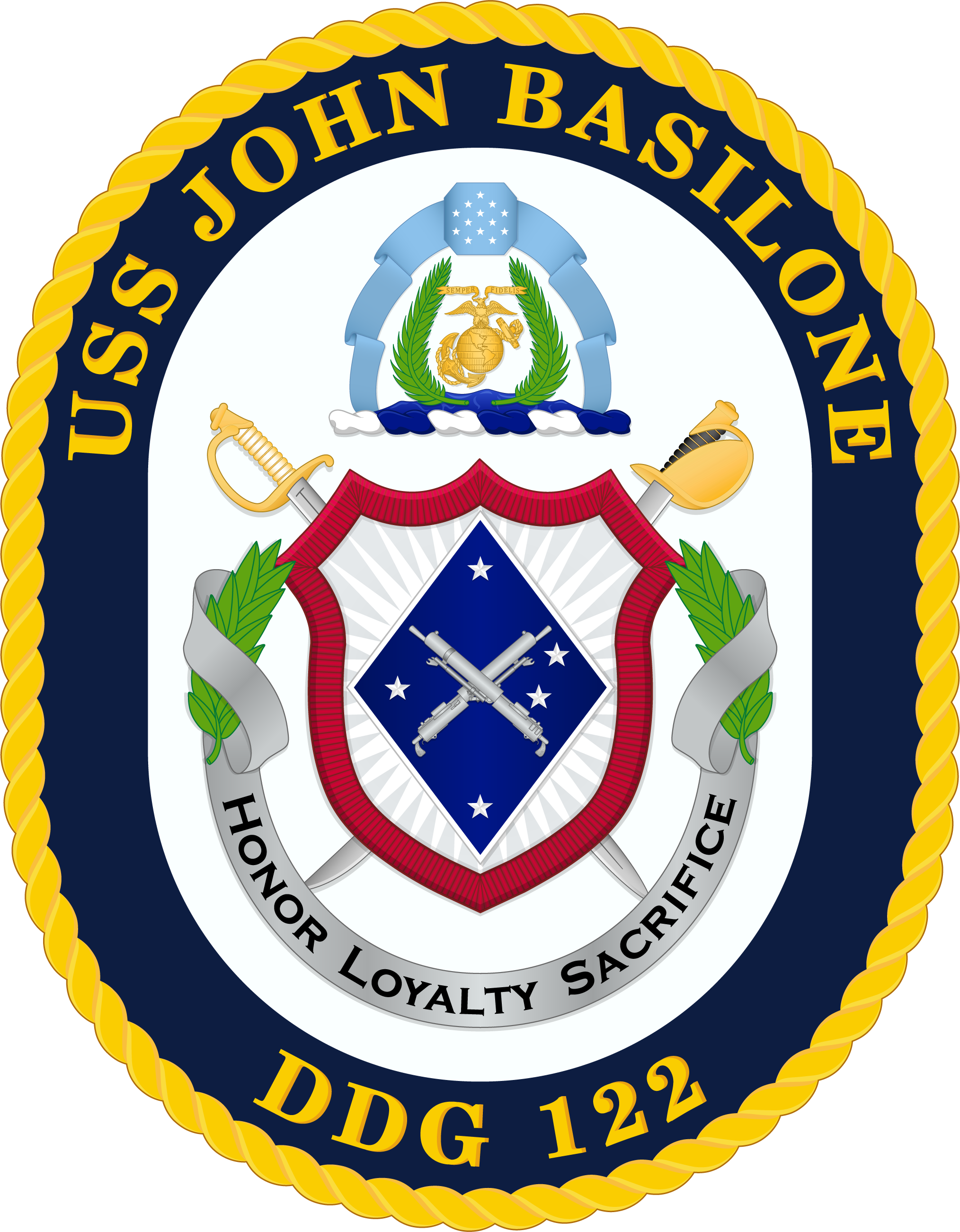
- Badge

General characteristics
- Class & type: Arleigh Burke-class destroyer
- Displacement: 9,217 tons (full load)
- Length: 513 ft (156 m)
- Beam: 66 ft (20 m)
- Propulsion: 4 × General Electric LM2500 gas turbines 100,000 shp (75,000 kW)
- Speed: 31 knots (57 km/h; 36 mph)
- Complement: 380 officers and enlisted
- Armament: Guns: 1 × 5-inch (127 mm)/62 Mk 45 Mod 4 (lightweight gun); 1 × 20 mm (0.8 in) Phalanx CIWS; 2 × 25 mm (0.98 in) Mk 38 machine gun system; 4 × 0.50 in (12.7 mm) caliber guns; Missiles: 1 × 32-cell, 1 × 64-cell (96 total cells) Mk 41 vertical launching system (VLS): RIM-66M surface-to-air missile; RIM-156 surface-to-air missile; RIM-174A Standard ERAM; RIM-161 anti-ballistic missile; RIM-162 ESSM (quad-packed); BGM-109 Tomahawk cruise missile; RUM-139 vertical launch ASROC; Torpedoes: 2 × Mark 32 triple torpedo tubes: Mark 46 lightweight torpedo; Mark 50 lightweight torpedo; Mark 54 lightweight torpedo
- Aircraft carried: 2 × MH-60R Seahawk helicopters
- Aviation facilities: Double hangar and helipad

USS John Basilone (DDG-122) is an Arleigh Burke-class (Flight IIA Technology Insertion) Aegis guided missile destroyer in the United States Navy. She is named for United States Marine Corps Gunnery Sergeant John Basilone, who received the Medal of Honor, the nation's highest military award for valor, for actions during the Guadalcanal Campaign in the Pacific War. Basilone was the only enlisted Marine to receive both the Medal of Honor and the Navy Cross during World War II.

This is the second US Navy vessel to be named after Basilone, the first being USS Basilone (DD-824), a Gearing-class destroyer commissioned in 1949 and decommissioned in 1977. The Navy christened PCU John Basilone in a ceremony held on 18 June 2022.

On 18 March 2024, the ship traveled the Kennebec River to the Atlantic Ocean for four days of sea trials. She was delivered to the US Navy in July 2024 by General Dynamics Bath Iron Works and was commissioned in New York City on 9 November 2024.
