= Lou Wilson (footballer) =

Australian rules footballer

Personal information
- Full name: Arnold Louis Wilson
- Born: 19 April 1887; Port Melbourne, Victoria
- Died: 1 November 1970 (aged 83); Kew, Victoria
- Original team: Beverley

Playing career^{1}
Years	Club	Games (Goals)
1913, 1915	Richmond	4 (0)
- ^{1} Playing statistics correct to the end of 1915.

Arnold Louis Wilson (19 April 1887 – 1 November 1970) was an Australian rules footballer who played with Richmond in the Victorian Football League (VFL).
