= USS Louis H. Wilson Jr. =

US Navy destroyer

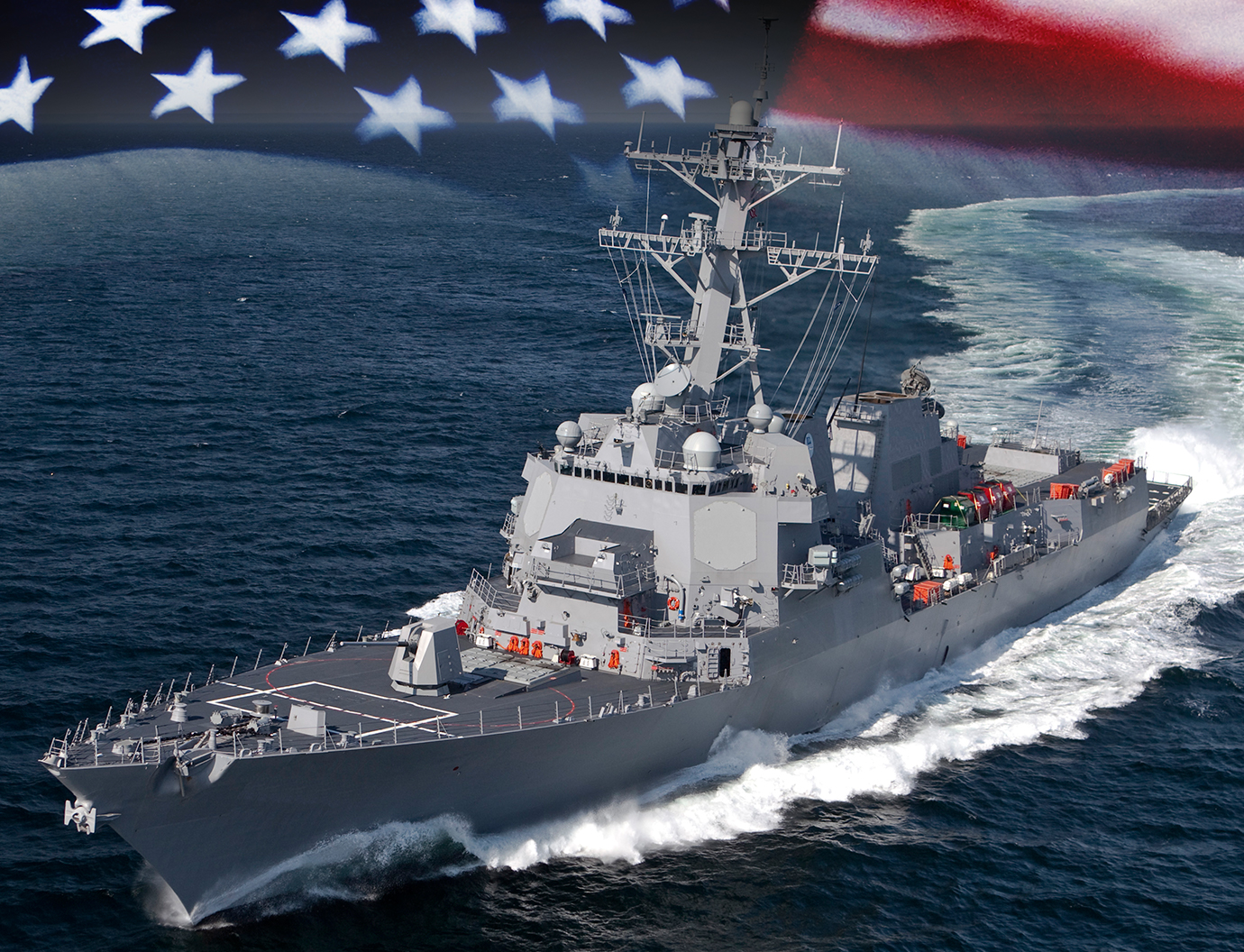
- Graphical depiction of USS Louis H. Wilson Jr. (DDG-126)

History

United States
- Name: Louis H. Wilson Jr.
- Namesake: Louis H. Wilson
- Builder: Bath Iron Works
- Laid down: 16 May 2023
- Launched: 10 October 2025
- Sponsored by: Susan J. Rabern; Janet Wilson Taylor
- Identification: Hull number: DDG-126
- Status: Launched
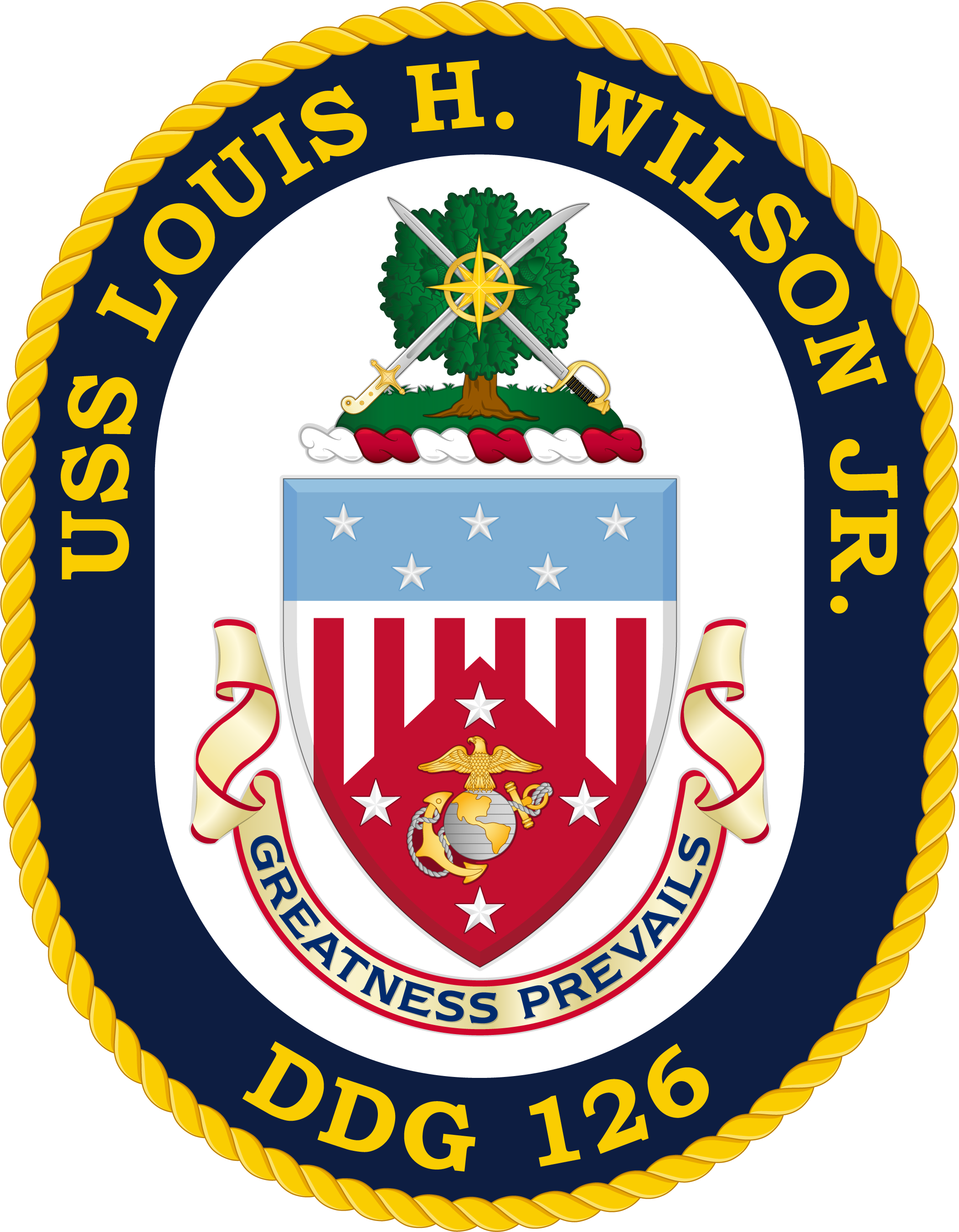
- Badge

General characteristics
- Class & type: Arleigh Burke-class destroyer
- Displacement: 9,217 tons (full load)
- Length: 510 ft (160 m)
- Beam: 66 ft (20 m)
- Propulsion: 4 × General Electric LM2500 gas turbines 100,000 shp (75,000 kW)
- Speed: 31 knots (57 km/h; 36 mph)
- Complement: 380 officers and enlisted
- Armament: Guns: 1 × 5-inch (127 mm)/62 Mk 45 Mod 4 (lightweight gun); 1 × 20 mm (0.8 in) Phalanx CIWS; 2 × 25 mm (0.98 in) Mk 38 machine gun system; 4 × 0.50 in (12.7 mm) caliber guns; Missiles: 1 × 32-cell, 1 × 64-cell (96 total cells) Mk 41 vertical launching system (VLS): RIM-66M surface-to-air missile; RIM-156 surface-to-air missile; RIM-174A Standard ERAM; RIM-161 anti-ballistic missile; RIM-162 ESSM (quad-packed); BGM-109 Tomahawk cruise missile; RUM-139 vertical launch ASROC; Torpedoes: 2 × Mark 32 triple torpedo tubes: Mark 46 lightweight torpedo; Mark 50 lightweight torpedo; Mark 54 lightweight torpedo
- Armor: Kevlar-type armor with steel hull. Numerous passive survivability measures.
- Aircraft carried: 2 × MH-60R Seahawk helicopters
- Aviation facilities: Double hangar and helipad

USS Louis H. Wilson Jr. (DDG-126) will be an Arleigh Burke-class (Flight III) Aegis guided missile destroyer of the United States Navy, the second of the Flight III variants. She is named after U.S. Marine Corps General Louis H. Wilson Jr., recipient of the Medal of Honor. On 17 September 2016 she was named by Secretary of the Navy Ray Mabus.

Bath Iron Works began fabrication of the vessel on 3 March 2020. She was christened on September 27, 2025.
