= List of ship commissionings in 2021 =

The list of ship commissionings in 2021 includes a chronological list of all ships commissioned in 2021.

	Operator	Ship	Class and type	Pennant	Other notes
Unknown	People's Liberation Army Navy	Jining	Jiangdao-class corvette	636	For PLAN
January	People's Liberation Army Navy	Suzhou	Luyang III-class destroyer	132	For PLAN
January	People's Liberation Army Navy	Dongying	Jiangdao-class corvette	607	For PLAN
January	People's Liberation Army Navy	Tianmen	Jiangdao-class corvette	631	For PLAN
January	People's Liberation Army Navy	Tongling	Jiangdao-class corvette	629	For PLAN
January	People's Liberation Army Navy	Shizuishan	Jiangdao-class corvette	609	For PLAN
January	People's Liberation Army Navy	Aba	Jiangdao-class corvette	630	For PLAN
30 January	People's Liberation Army Navy	Nanyang	Jiangdao-class corvette	619	For PLAN
30 January	Russian Navy	Grayvoron	Buyan-M-class corvette	600	For Russian Navy
February	People's Liberation Army Navy	Huainan	Luyang III-class destroyer	123	For PLAN
February	People's Liberation Army Navy	Shangqiu	Jiangdao-class corvette	618	For PLAN
4 February	People's Liberation Army Navy	Shiyan	Jiangdao-class corvette	637	For PLAN
7 March	People's Liberation Army Navy	Lhasa	Renhai-class destroyer	102	For PLAN
12 March	Italian Navy	Vulcano	Vulcano-class logistic support ship	A 5335	For Italian Navy
16 March	Japan Maritime Self-Defense Force	Etajima	Awaji-class minesweeper	MSO-306	For Japanese Navy
19 March	Japan Maritime Self-Defense Force	Haguro	Maya-class destroyer	DDG-180	For Japanese Navy
24 March	Japan Maritime Self-Defense Force	Tōryū	Sōryū-class submarine	SS-512	For Japanese Navy
6 April	Indonesian Navy	Alugoro	Nagapasa-class submarine	405	For Indonesian Navy
12 April	People's Liberation Army Navy	Nanning	Luyang III-class destroyer	162	For PLAN
16 April	People's Liberation Army Navy	Kaifeng	Luyang III-class destroyer	124	For PLAN
16 April	French Navy	Alsace	Aquitaine-class frigate	D656	For French Navy
17 April	United States Navy	Oakland	Independence-class littoral combat ship	LCS-24	For U.S. Navy
23 April	People's Liberation Army Navy	Changzheng 21	Jin-class submarine	421	For PLAN
23 April	People's Liberation Army Navy	Dalian	Renhai-class destroyer	105	For PLAN
23 April	People's Liberation Army Navy	Hainan	Yushen-class amphibious assault ship	31	For PLAN
5 May	Russian Navy	Kazan	Yasen-M-class submarine	K-561	For Russian Navy
8 May	United States Navy	Miguel Keith	Lewis B. Puller-class expeditionary mobile base	ESB-5	For U.S. Navy
17 May	German Navy	Sachsen-Anhalt	Baden-Württemberg-class frigate	F224	For German Navy
22 May	United States Navy	Mobile	Independence-class littoral combat ship	LCS-26	For U.S. Navy
2 June	Spanish Navy	Reina Ysabel	Suardiaz Galizia-class logistics support ship	A-06	For Spanish Navy
18 June	Royal Navy	Spey	River-class offshore patrol vessel	P234	For Royal Navy
12 July	Indonesian Navy	Teluk Youtefa	Teluk Bintuni-class tank landing ship	522	For Indonesian Navy
27 July	Republic of China Navy	Ta Chiang	Tuo Chiang-class corvette	PGG-619	For ROCN
8 August	Russian Navy	Vsevolod Bobrov	Elbrus-class logistics support vessel	RLO52	For Russian Navy
11 August	Turkmen Naval Forces	Deňiz Han	Turkmen-class corvette	01	For Turkmenistan Navy
20 August	Russian Navy	Georgiy Kurbatov	Alexandrit-class minesweeper	631	For Russian Navy
28 August	Royal Navy	Severn	River-class offshore patrol vessel	P282	For Royal Navy (recommissioned)
September	Republic of China Navy	FMLB-2	Min Jiang-class minelayer	FMLB-2	For ROCN
September	People's Liberation Army Navy	Guilin	Luyang III-class destroyer	164	For PLAN
23 September	Royal Navy	Audacious	Astute-class submarine	S122	For Royal Navy
12 October	Russian Navy	Magadan	Improved Kilo-class submarine	B-602	For Russian Navy
11 November	People's Liberation Army Navy	Anshan	Renhai-class destroyer	103	For PLAN
December	Republic of China Navy	FMLB-3	Min Jiang-class minelayer	FMLB-3	For ROCN
December	Republic of China Navy	FMLB-4	Min Jiang-class minelayer	FMLB-4	For ROCN
8 December	United States Navy	Daniel Inouye	Arleigh Burke-class destroyer	DDG-118	For U.S. Navy
21 December	Russian Navy	Knyaz Oleg	Borei-A-class submarine	K-552	For Russian Navy
21 December	Russian Navy	Novosibirsk	Yasen-M-class submarine	K-573	For Russian Navy
25 December	People's Liberation Army Navy	Zhanjiang	Luyang III-class destroyer	165	For PLAN
28 December	People's Liberation Army Navy	Baotou	Luyang III-class destroyer	133	For PLAN
