= Guided-missile destroyer =

Destroyer equipped with guided missiles

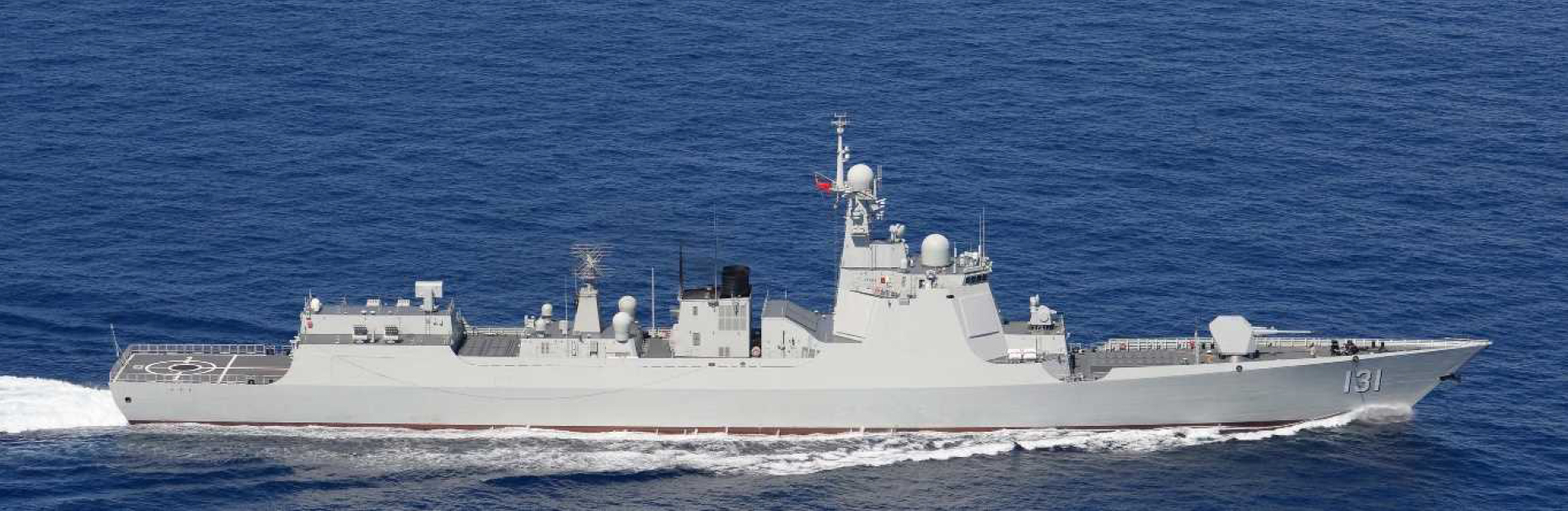
Taiyuan (131), a Type 052D (Luyang III-class) guided-missile destroyer

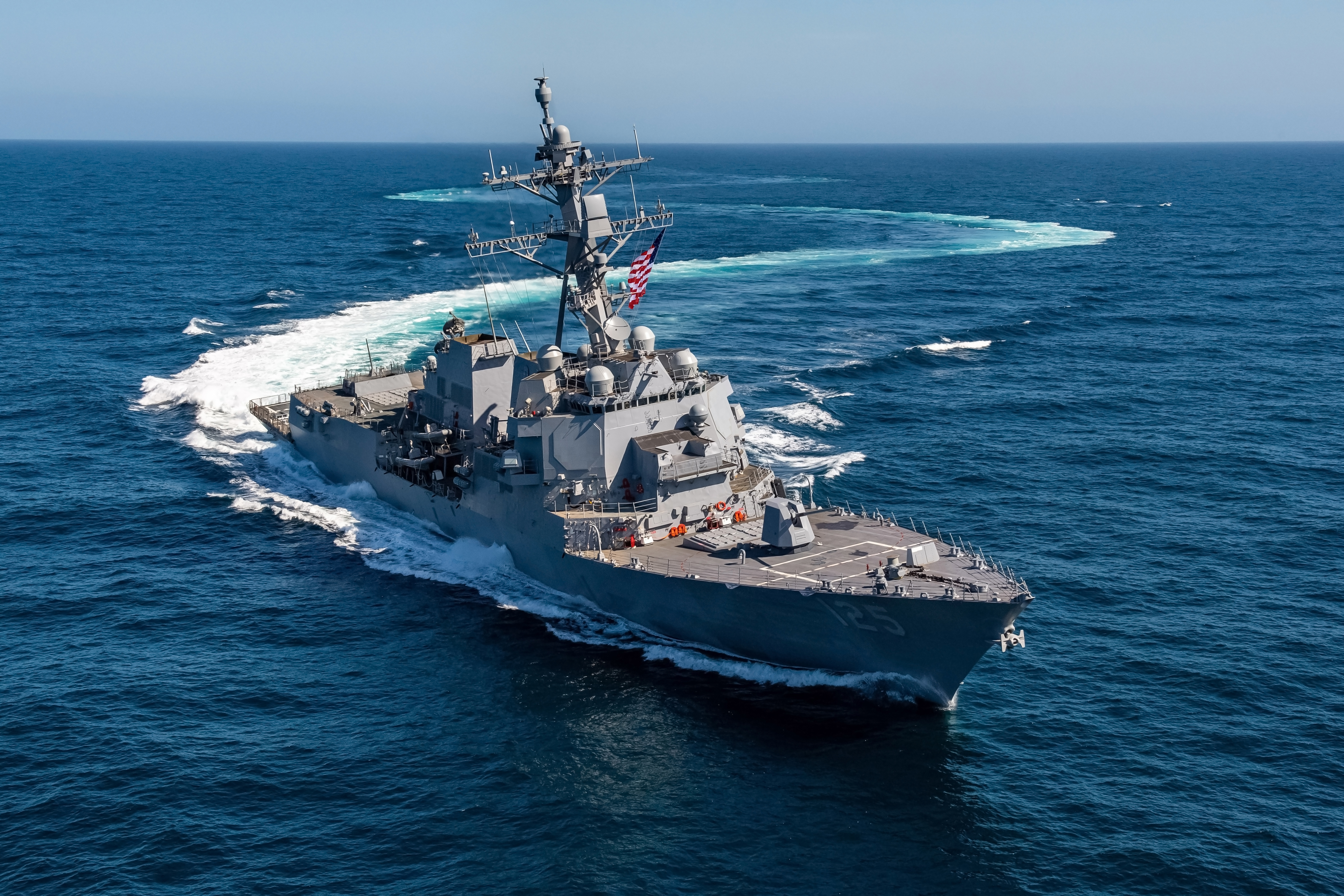
USS Jack H. Lucas, an Arleigh-Burke-class Flight III guided-missile destroyer

A guided-missile destroyer (DDG) is a destroyer whose primary armament is guided missiles so they can provide anti-aircraft warfare screening for the fleet. Most modern destroyers are of the multi-purpose guided-missile type, and they are widely deployed by advanced navies; in particular, the Arleigh Burke-class guided-missile destroyer is the most numerous class of warship in the US Navy. The Chinese People's Liberation Army Navy also maintains a large fleet of destroyers that includes Type 055 and Type 052D class destroyers.

Guided-missile destroyers are equipped with large missile magazines, with modern examples typically having vertical-launch cells. Some contain integrated weapons systems, such as the United States’ Aegis Combat System, and may be adopted for use in an anti-missile or ballistic-missile defense role. This is especially true for navies that no longer operate cruisers, so other vessels must be adopted to fill in the gap.

Many guided-missile destroyers are also multipurpose vessels, equipped to carry out anti-surface operations with surface-to-surface missiles and naval guns, and anti-submarine warfare with torpedoes and helicopters.

The NATO standard designation for these vessels is DDG, while destroyers which have a primary gun armament or a small number of anti-aircraft missiles sufficient only for point-defense are designated DD. Nations vary in their use of destroyer D designation in their hull pennant numbering, either prefixing or dropping it altogether.

== Active and planned ==
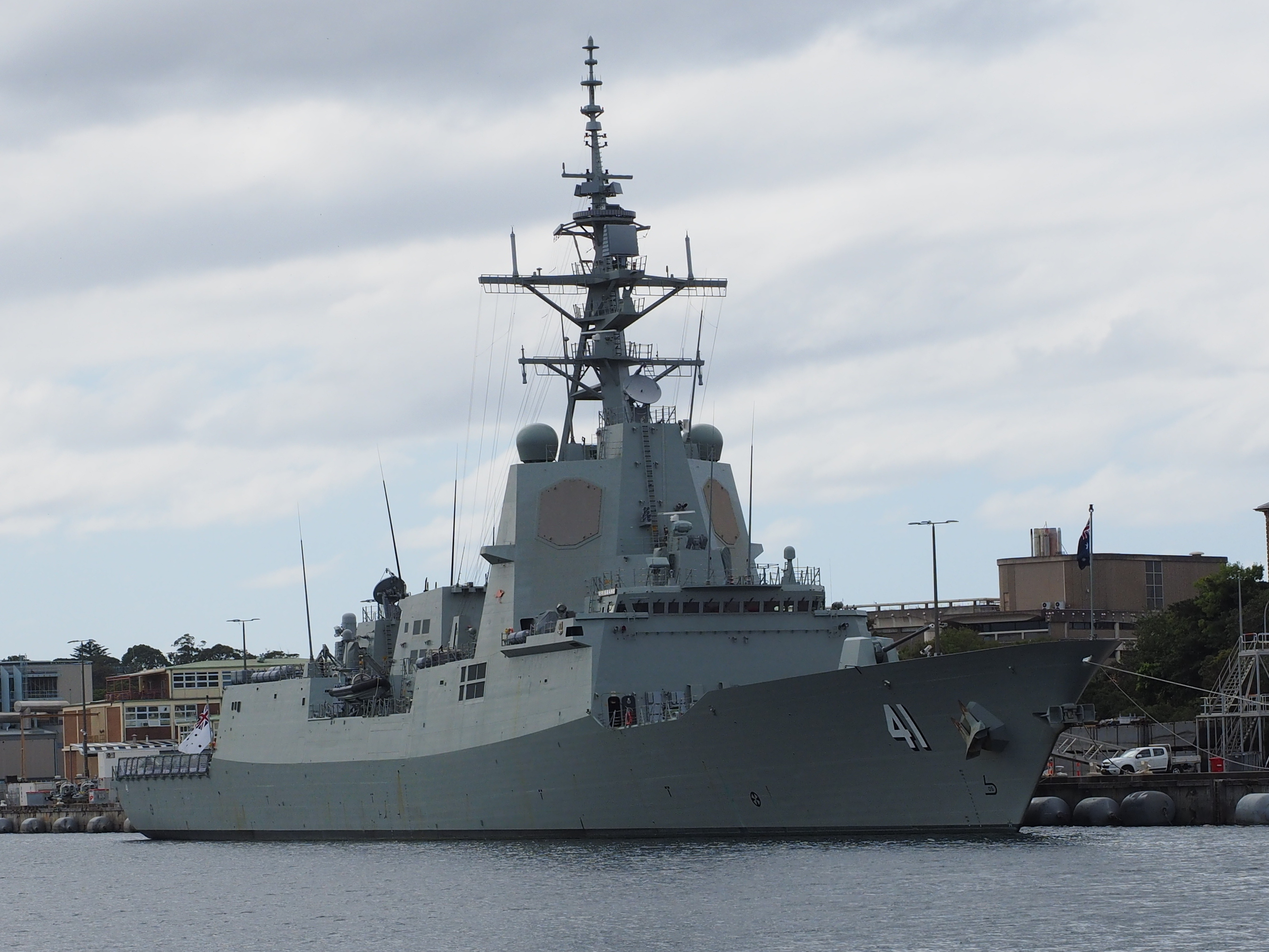
Australian HMAS Brisbane

=== Royal Australian Navy ===
- Hobart-class destroyer
  - HMAS Hobart (DDG 39)
  - HMAS Brisbane (DDG 41)
  - HMAS Sydney (DDG 42)

=== Royal Canadian Navy ===
- River-class destroyer (3 ordered; 15 planned; British Type 26 design, classed as a destroyer by the RCN but not the Royal Navy)
  - HMCS Fraser
  - HMCS Saint-Laurent
  - HMCS Mackenzie

=== Chinese People's Liberation Army Navy ===
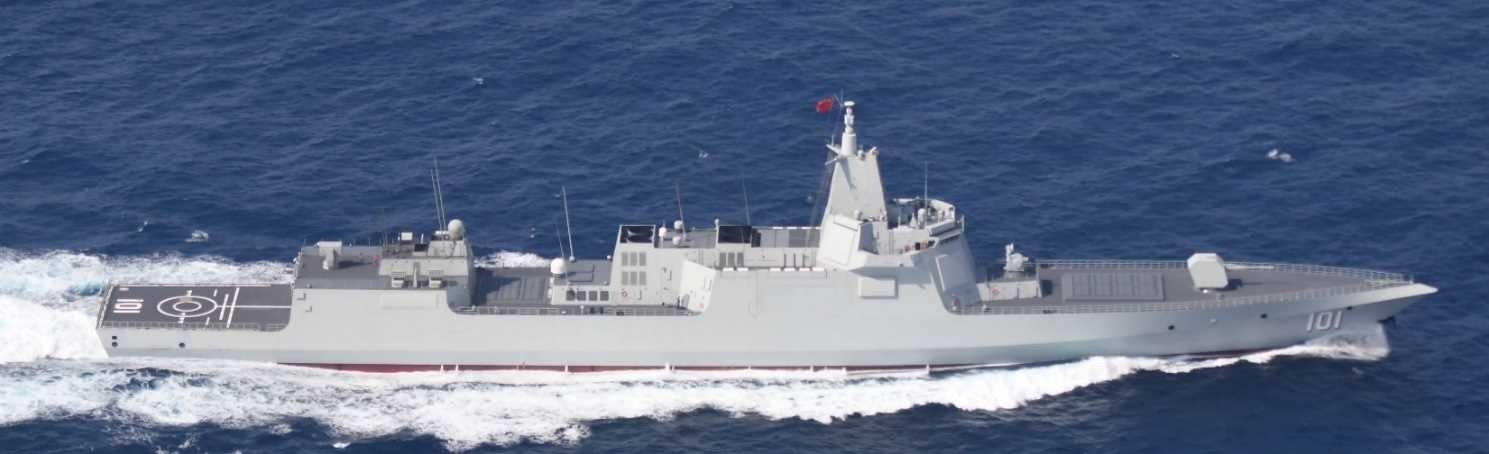
Type 055 destroyer is the largest destroyer class of the People's Liberation Army Navy

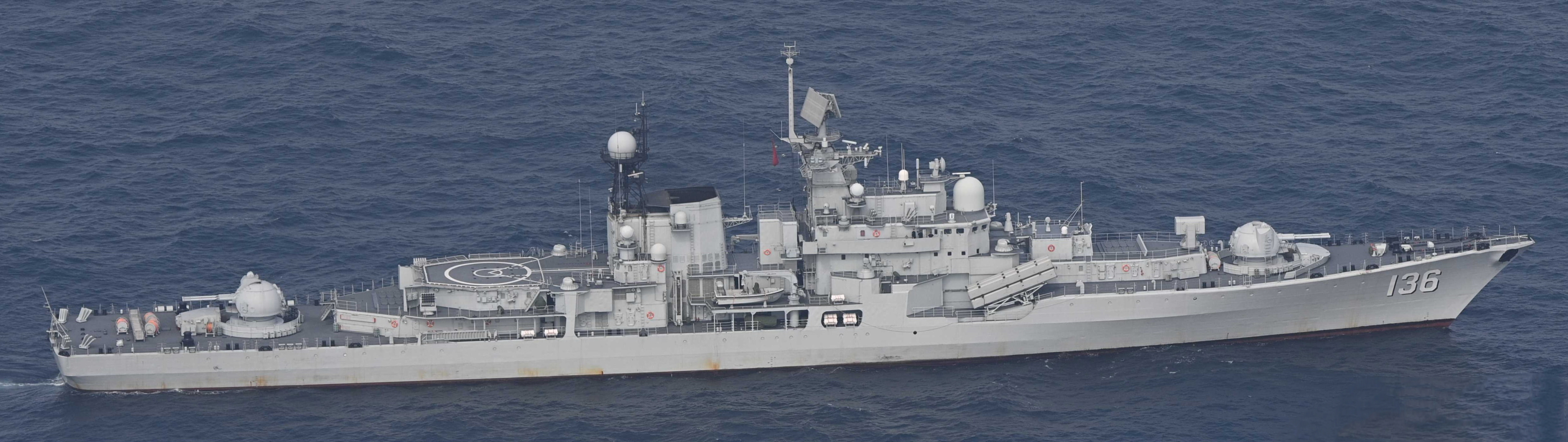
Chinese modernized Sovremenny-class (Project 956E) PLAN destroyer Hangzhou equipped with vertical launching system (VLS)

- Type 055 destroyer (Renhai-class cruiser)
  - Nanchang (DDG-101)
  - La'sa (DDG-102)
  - Dalian (DDG-105)
  - Anshan (DDG-103)
  - Yan'an (DDG-106)
  - Wuxi (DDG-104)
  - Zunyi (DDG-107)
  - Xianyang (DDG-108)
- Type 052D (Luyang III-class) destroyer
  - Kunming (DDG-172)
  - Changsha (DDG-173)
  - Hefei (DDG-174)
  - Yinchuan (DDG-175)
  - Xining (DDG-117)
  - Xiamen (DDG-154)
  - Ürümqi (DDG-118)
  - Guiyang (DDG-119)
  - Nanjing (DDG-155)
  - Taiyuan (DDG-131)
  - Hohhot (DDG-161)
  - Chengdu (DDG-120)
  - Qiqihar (DDG-121)
  - Zibo (DDG-156)
  - Tangshan (DDG-122)
  - Suzhou (DDG-132)
  - Huainan (DDG-123)
  - Nanning (DDG-162)
  - Kaifeng (DDG-124)
  - Guilin (DDG-164)
  - Baotou (DDG-133)
  - Zhenjiang (DDG-165)
  - Shaoxing (DDG-134)
  - Jiaozuo (DDG-163)
  - Zhuhai (DDG-157)
- Type 052C (Luyang II-class) destroyer
  - Lanzhou (DDG-170)
  - Haikou (DDG-171)
  - Changchun (DDG-150)
  - Zhengzhou (DDG-151)
  - Jinan (DDG-152)
  - Xi'an (DDG-153)
- Type 052B (Luyang I-class) destroyer
  - Guangzhou (DDG-168)
  - Wuhan (DDG-169)
- Type 051C (Luzhou-class) destroyer
  - Shenyang (DDG-115)
  - Shijiazhuang (DDG-116)
- Type 051B (Luhai-class) destroyer
  - Shenzhen (DDG-167)
- Sovremenny-class destroyer
  - Hangzhou (DDG-136)
  - Fuzhou (DDG-137)
  - Taizhou (DDG-138)
  - Ningbo (DDG-139)

=== Republic of China Navy ===
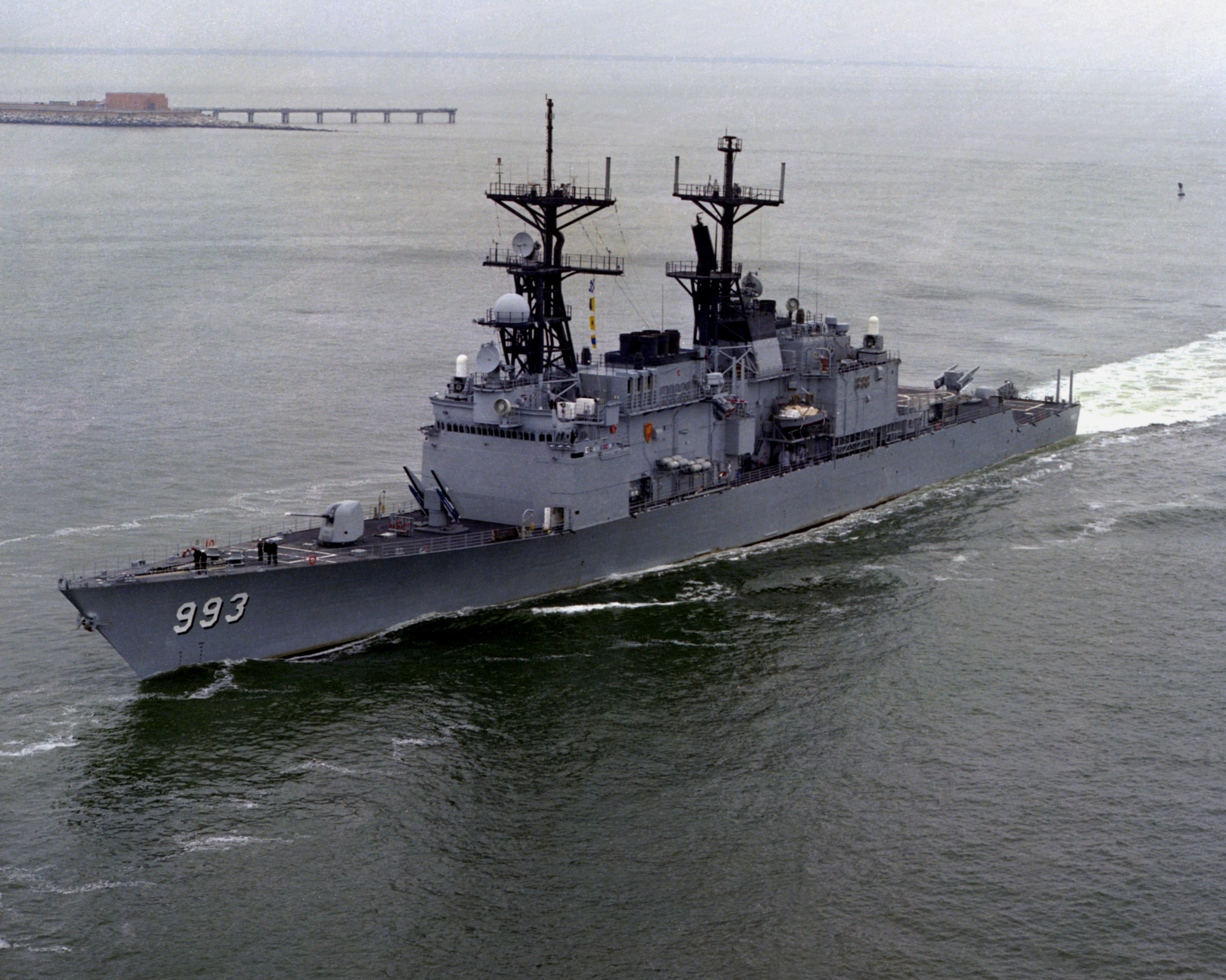
ROCS Tso Ying

- Kee Lung-class destroyer (ex-Kidd class)
  - ROCS Kee Lung (DDG-1801)
  - ROCS Su Ao (DDG-1802)
  - ROCS Tso Ying (DDG-1803)
  - ROCS Ma Kong (DDG-1805)

=== French Navy ===
Although the French Navy no longer uses the term "destroyer", the largest frigates are assigned pennant numbers with flag superior "D", which designates destroyer.

- Horizon class (in France designated as frigate, designated as destroyers using NATO classification)
  - Forbin (D620)
  - Chevalier Paul (D621)

(Aquitaine and Amiral Ronarc'h-class vessels also assigned destroyer ("D") pennant numbers, though classed as frigates by the French Navy)

=== Indian Navy ===
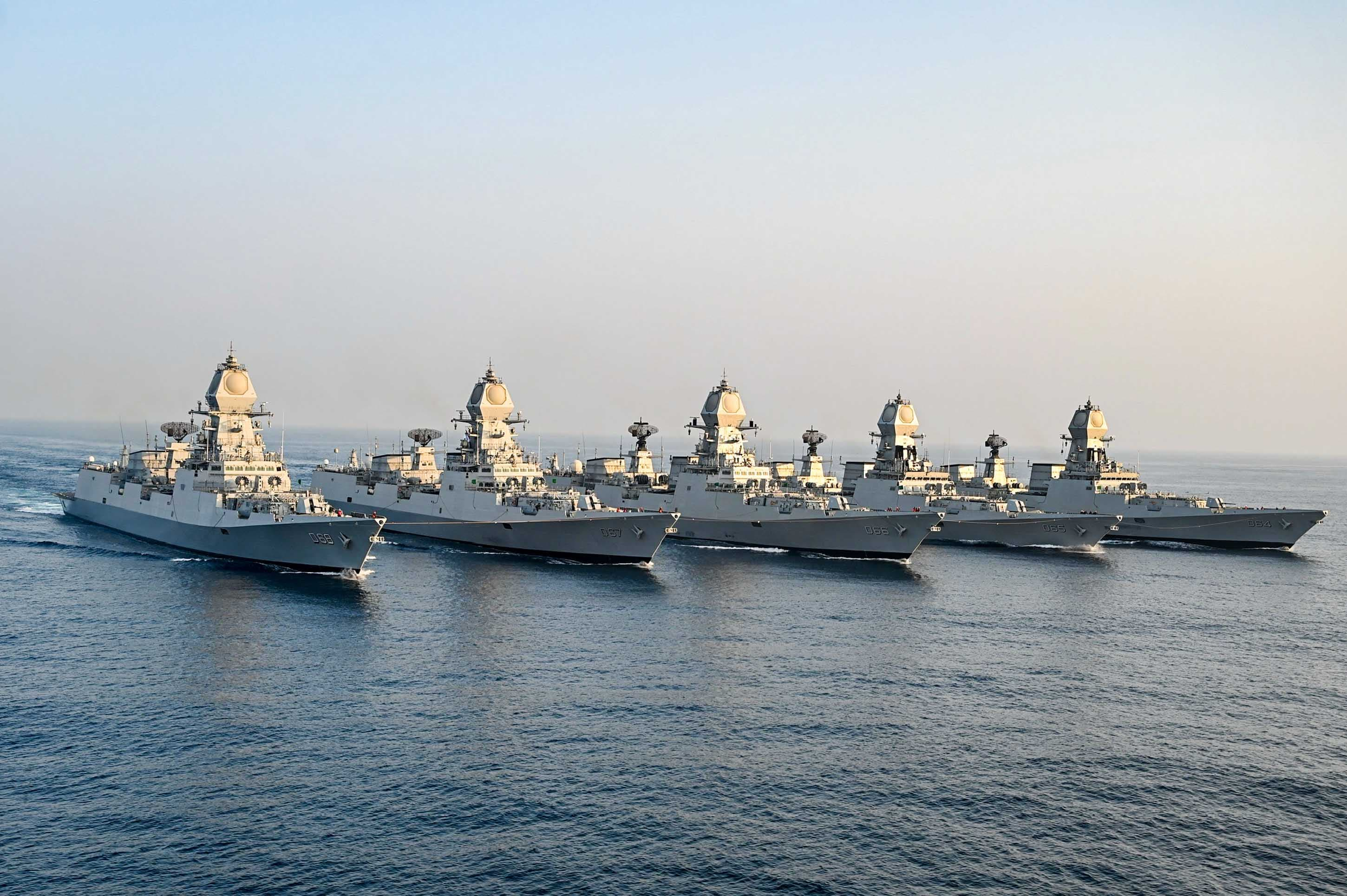
Indian Navy destroyers sailing in unison

- Project 18-class destroyer (planned)
- Visakhapatnam-class destroyer
  - INS Visakhapatnam (D66)
  - INS Mormugao (D67)
  - INS Imphal (D68)
  - INS Surat (D69)
- Kolkata-class destroyer
  - INS Kolkata (D63)
  - INS Kochi (D64)
  - INS Chennai (D65)
- Delhi-class destroyer
  - INS Delhi (D61)
  - INS Mysore (D60)
  - INS Mumbai (D62)
- Rajput-class destroyer
  - INS Rana (D52)
  - INS Ranvir (D54)
  - INS Ranvijay (D55)

=== Italian Navy ===
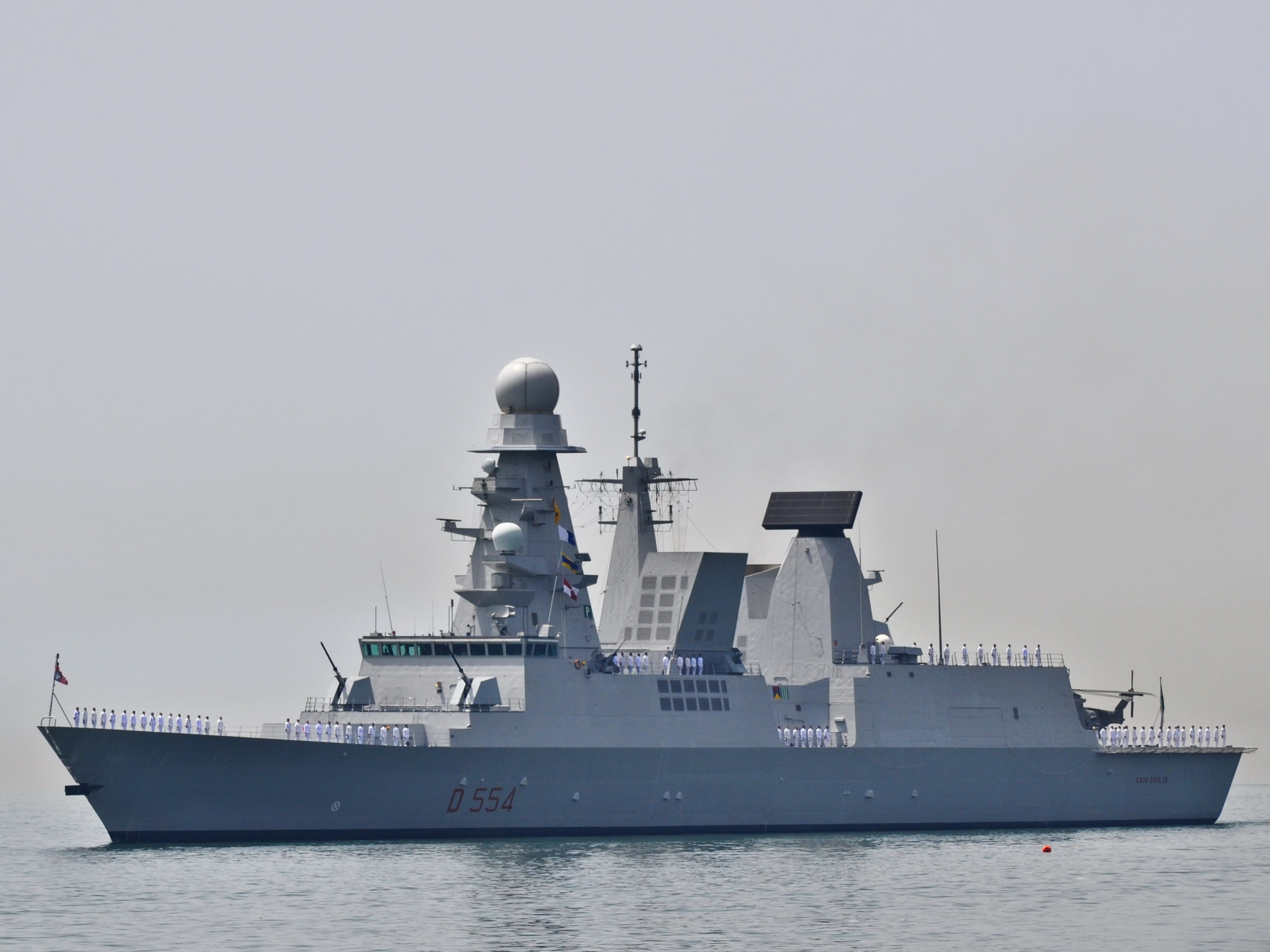
Destroyer Caio Duilio of the Italian Navy

- Durand de la Penne-class destroyer
  - Luigi Durand De La Penne (D 560)
  - Francesco Mimbelli (D 561)
- Horizon class
  - Andrea Doria (D553)
  - Caio Duilio (D554)

=== Japan Maritime Self-Defense Force ===
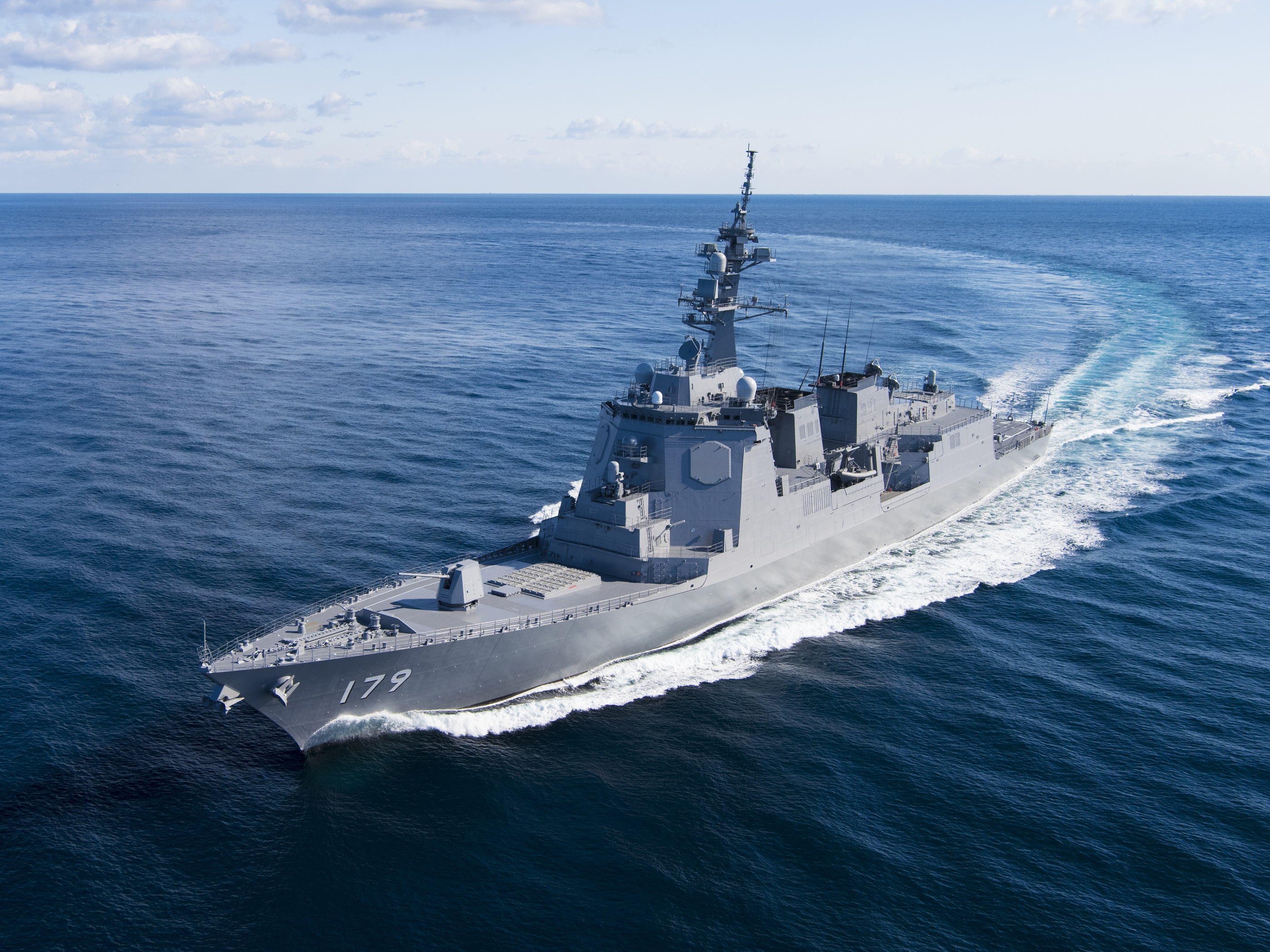
The Japanese guided-missile destroyer Maya

- Maya-class destroyer
  - JS Maya (DDG-179)
  - JS Haguro (DDG-180)
- Atago-class destroyer
  - JS Atago (DDG-177)
  - JS Ashigara (DDG-178)
- Kongō-class destroyer
  - JS Kongo (DDG-173)
  - JS Kirishima (DDG-174)
  - JS Myoko (DDG-175)
  - JS Chokai (DDG-176)
- Hatakaze-class destroyer
  - JS Shimakaze (DDG-172)

=== Korean People's Navy ===
- Choe Hyon-class destroyer
  - Choe Hyon (DDG-51)
  - Kang Kon (DDG-52)

=== Republic of Korea Navy ===
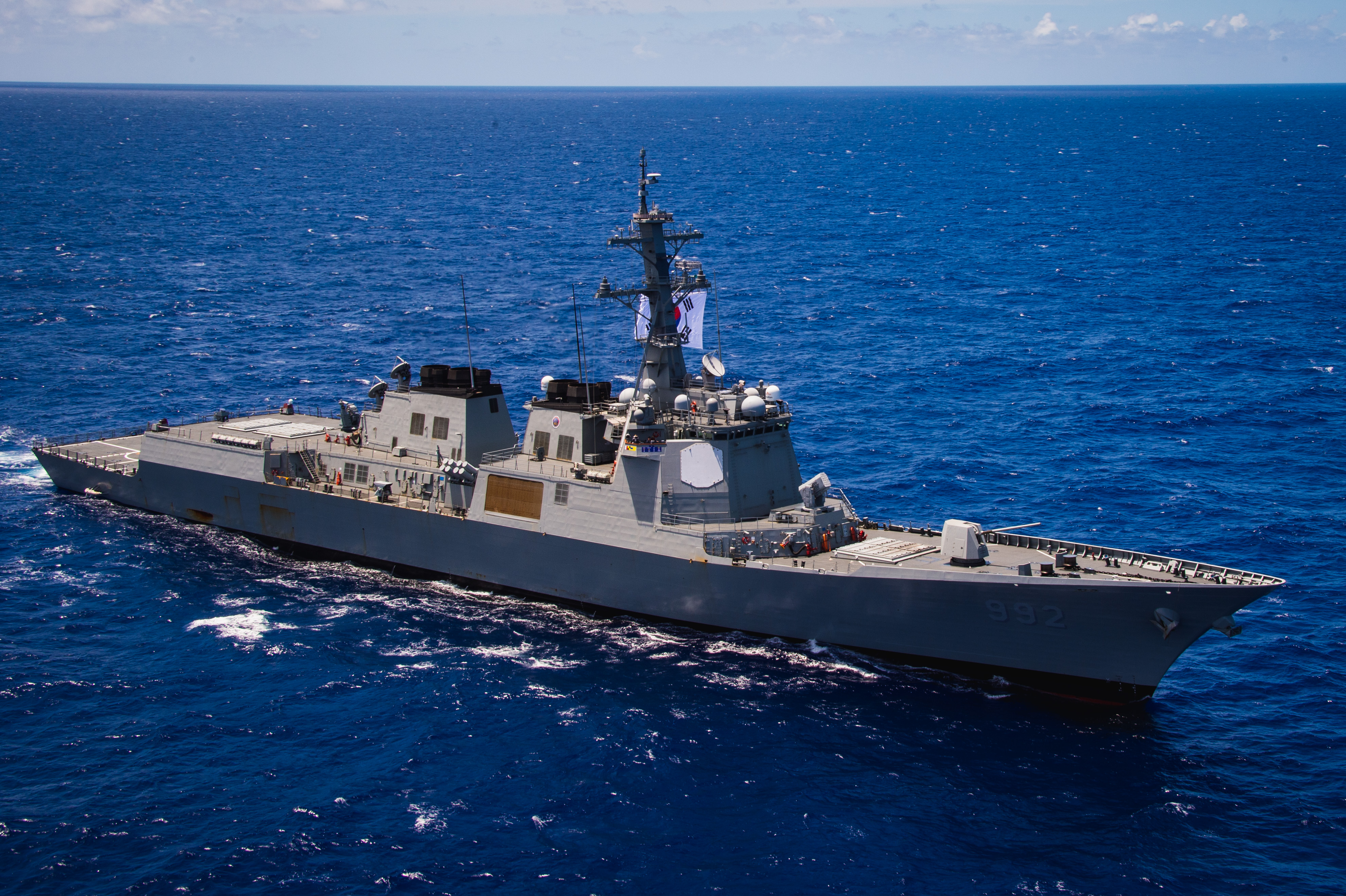
ROKS Yulgok Yi I

- Sejong the Great-class destroyer
  - ROKS Sejong the Great (DDG-991)
  - ROKS Yulgok Yi I (DDG-992)
  - ROKS Seoae Ryu Seong-ryong (DDG-993)
  - ROKS Jeongjo the Great (DDG-995)
- KDDX-class destroyer (planned)

=== Royal Navy ===
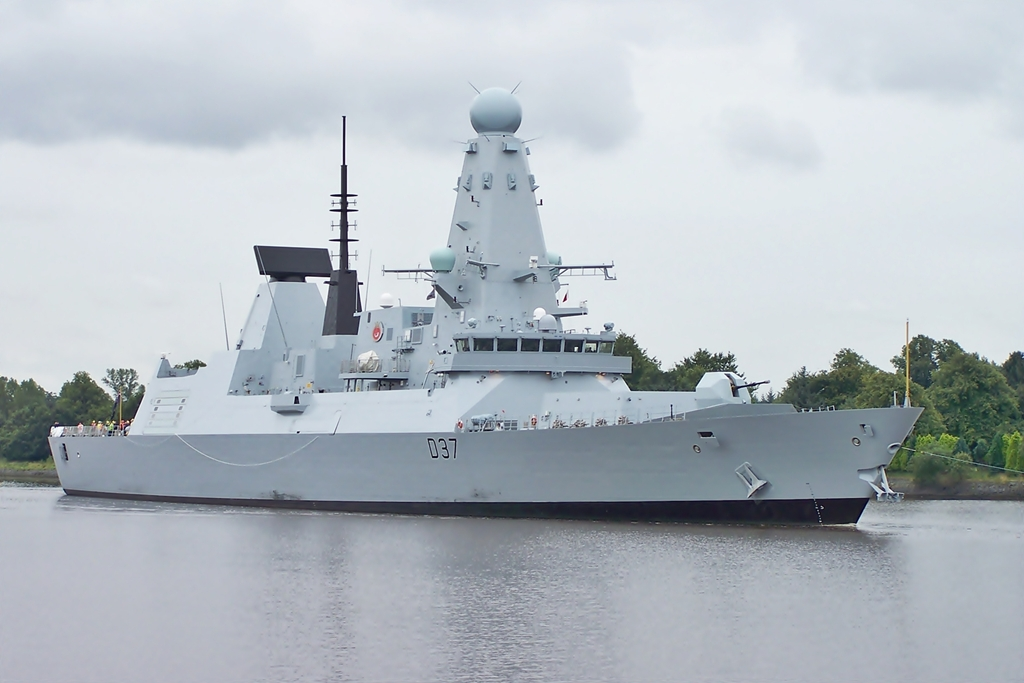
HMS Duncan

- Type 45 destroyer
  - HMS Daring (D32)
  - HMS Dauntless (D33)
  - HMS Diamond (D34)
  - HMS Dragon (D35)
  - HMS Defender (D36)
  - HMS Duncan (D37)
- Type 83 destroyer (cancelled as of 2026)

=== Russian Navy ===
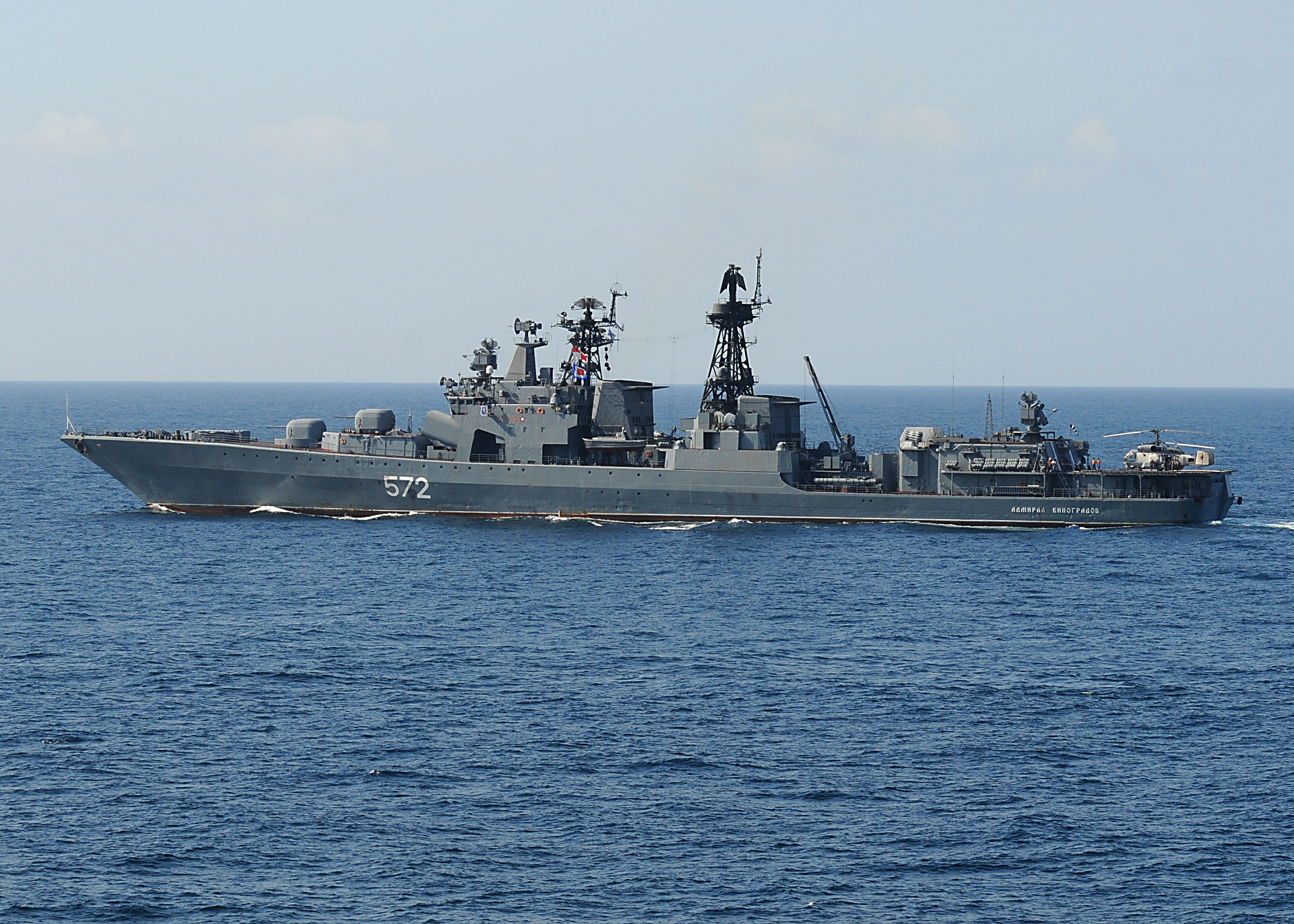
Admiral Vinogradov, an Udaloy-class destroyer

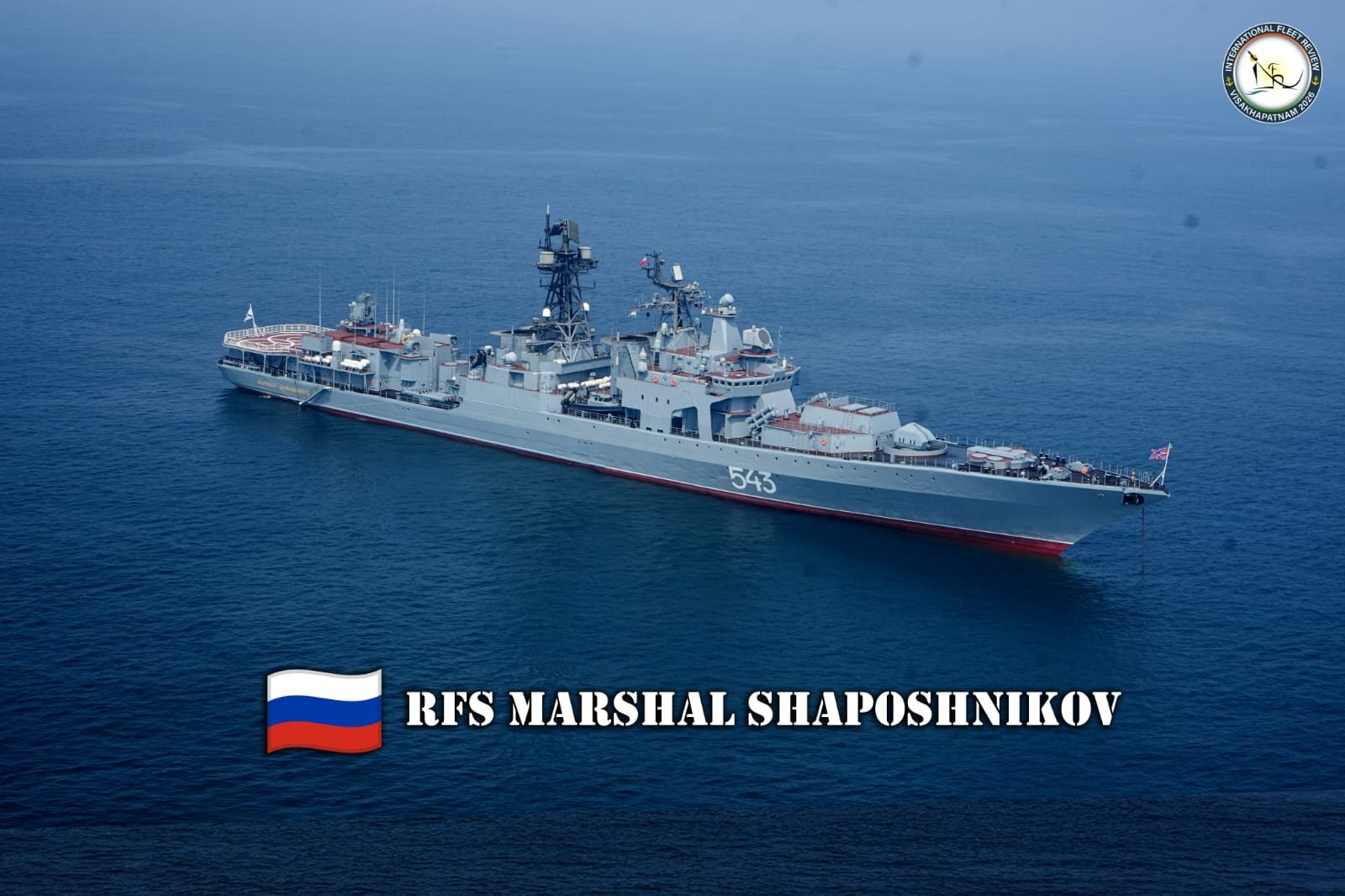
The "Marshal Shaposhnikov" was originally classified as a destroyer, but after a modernization, (visible in the image) it became classified as a frigate.

- Sovremenny-class destroyer
  - Burny (778) (out of service for twenty years as of 2025 and may be decommissioned)
  - Nastoychivy (610) (reported as possibly having decommissioned in 2025 - unconfirmed)
- Udaloy-class destroyer
  - Vice-Admiral Kulakov (626)
  - Admiral Tributs (564)
  - Marshal Shaposhnikov (543)
  - Severomorsk (619)
  - Admiral Levchenko (605)
  - Admiral Vinogradov (572)
  - Admiral Panteleyev (548)
  - Admiral Chabanenko (650)

=== Spanish Navy ===
  - F110 Bonifaz class frigate
  - Bonifaz (F111)
- Álvaro de Bazán class F100 class (in Spain designated as frigate, designated as destroyers using NATO classification)
  - Álvaro de Bazán (F101)
  - Almirante Juan de Borbón (F102)
  - Blas de Lezo (F103)
  - Méndez Núñez (F104)
  - Cristóbal Colón (F105)

=== Turkish Navy ===
- TF2000-class destroyer (planned, 8 ships to be built)

=== United States Navy ===
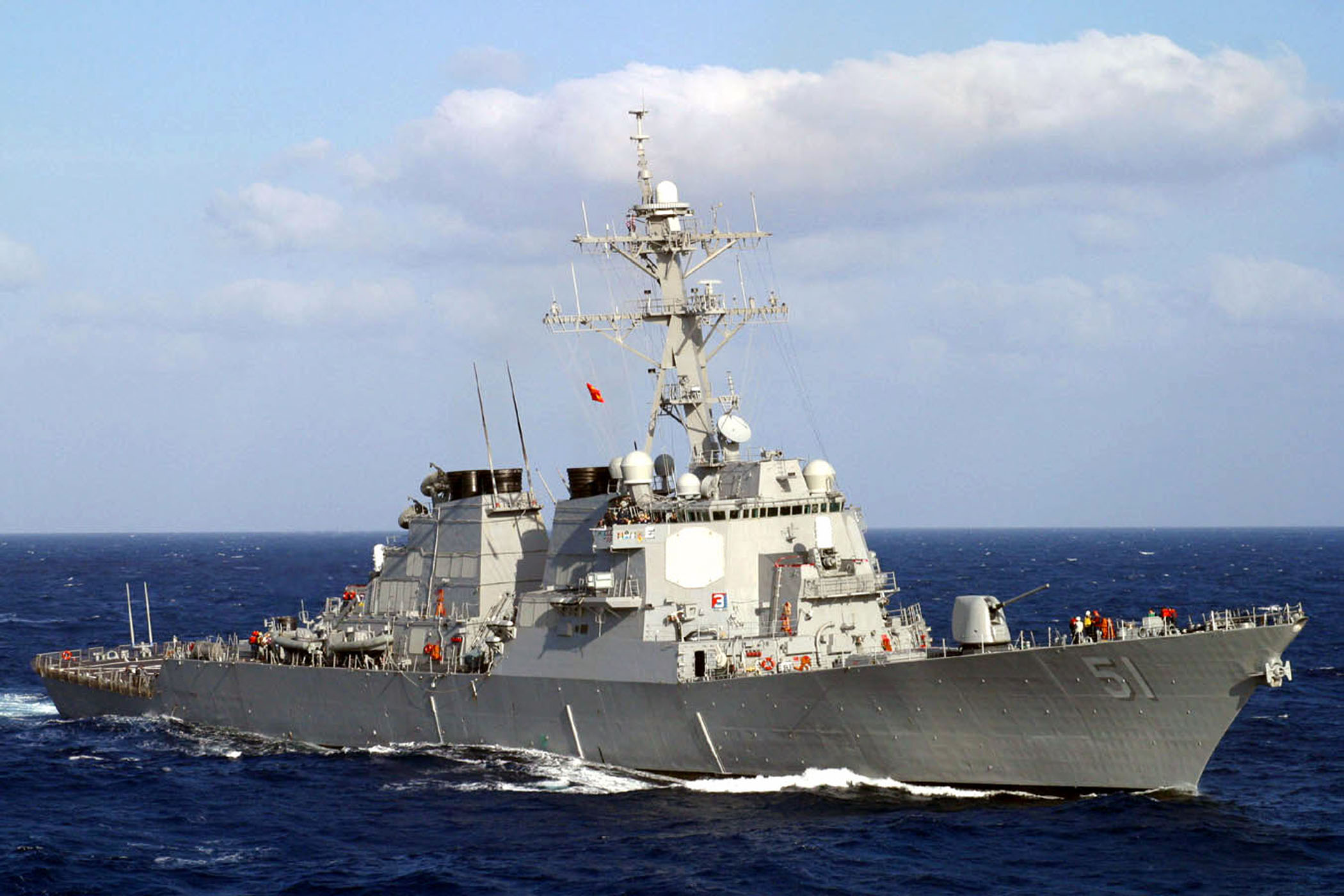
Arleigh Burke-class destroyer

- Arleigh Burke-class destroyer
  - USS Arleigh Burke (DDG-51)
  - USS Barry (DDG-52)
  - USS John Paul Jones (DDG-53)
  - USS Curtis Wilbur (DDG-54)
  - USS Stout (DDG-55)
  - USS John S. McCain (DDG-56)
  - USS Mitscher (DDG-57)
  - USS Laboon (DDG-58)
  - USS Russell (DDG-59)
  - USS Paul Hamilton (DDG-60)
  - USS Ramage (DDG-61)
  - USS Fitzgerald (DDG-62)
  - USS Stethem (DDG-63)
  - USS Carney (DDG-64)
  - USS Benfold (DDG-65)
  - USS Gonzalez (DDG-66)
  - USS Cole (DDG-67)
  - USS The Sullivans (DDG-68)
  - USS Milius (DDG-69)
  - USS Hopper (DDG-70)
  - USS Ross (DDG-71)
  - USS Mahan (DDG-72)
  - USS Decatur (DDG-73)
  - USS McFaul (DDG-74)
  - USS Donald Cook (DDG-75)
  - USS Higgins (DDG-76)
  - USS O'Kane (DDG-77)
  - USS Porter (DDG-78)
  - USS Oscar Austin (DDG-79)
  - USS Roosevelt (DDG-80)
  - USS Winston S. Churchill (DDG-81)
  - USS Lassen (DDG-82)
  - USS Howard (DDG-83)
  - USS Bulkeley (DDG-84)
  - USS McCampbell (DDG-85)
  - USS Shoup (DDG-86)
  - USS Mason (DDG-87)
  - USS Preble (DDG-88)
  - USS Mustin (DDG-89)
  - USS Chafee (DDG-90)
  - USS Pinckney (DDG-91)
  - USS Momsen (DDG-92)
  - USS Chung-Hoon (DDG-93)
  - USS Nitze (DDG-94)
  - USS James E. Williams (DDG-95)
  - USS Bainbridge (DDG-96)
  - USS Halsey (DDG-97)
  - USS Forrest Sherman (DDG-98)
  - USS Farragut (DDG-99)
  - USS Kidd (DDG-100)
  - USS Gridley (DDG-101)
  - USS Sampson (DDG-102)
  - USS Truxtun (DDG-103)
  - USS Sterett (DDG-104)
  - USS Dewey (DDG-105)
  - USS Stockdale (DDG-106)
  - USS Gravely (DDG-107)
  - USS Wayne E. Meyer (DDG-108)
  - USS Jason Dunham (DDG-109)
  - USS William P. Lawrence (DDG-110)
  - USS Spruance (DDG-111)
  - USS Michael Murphy (DDG-112)
  - USS John Finn (DDG-113)
  - USS Ralph Johnson (DDG-114)
  - USS Rafael Peralta (DDG-115)
  - USS Thomas Hudner (DDG-116)
  - USS Paul Ignatius (DDG-117)
  - USS Daniel Inouye (DDG-118)
  - USS Delbert D. Black (DDG-119)
  - USS Carl M. Levin (DDG-120)
  - USS Frank E. Petersen Jr. (DDG-121)
  - USS John Basilone (DDG-122) (Launched)
  - USS Lenah H. Sutcliffe Higbee (DDG-123)
  - USS Harvey C. Barnum Jr. (DDG-124) (Under construction)
  - USS Jack H. Lucas (DDG-125)
  - USS Louis H. Wilson Jr. (DDG-126) (Under construction)
  - USS Patrick Gallagher (DDG-127) (Under construction)
  - USS Ted Stevens (DDG-128) (Launched)
  - USS Jeremiah Denton (DDG-129) (Under construction)
  - USS William Charette (DDG-130) (Under construction)
  - USS George M. Neal (DDG-131) (Under construction)
  - USS Quentin Walsh (DDG-132) (Under construction)
  - USS Sam Nunn (DDG-133) (Under construction)
  - USS John E. Kilmer (DDG-134) (Approved for construction)
  - USS Thad Cochran (DDG-135) (Approved for construction)
  - USS Richard G. Lugar (DDG-136) (Approved for construction)
  - USS John F. Lehman (DDG-137) (Approved for construction)
  - USS J. William Middendorf (DDG-138) (Approved for construction)
  - USS Telesforo Trinidad (DDG-139) (Approved for construction)
  - USS Thomas G. Kelley (DDG-140) (Approved for construction)
  - USS Ernest E. Evans (DDG-141) (Approved for construction)
  - USS Charles Jackson French (DDG-142)(Approved for construction)
  - USS Richard J. Danzig (DDG-143) (Approved for construction)
  - USS Michael G. Mullen (DDG-144) (Approved for construction)
  - USS Intrepid (DDG-145) (Approved for construction)
  - USS Robert Kerrey (DDG-146) (Approved for construction)
  - USS Ray Mabus (DDG-147) (Approved for construction)
  - USS Kyle Carpenter (DDG-148) (Approved for construction)
- Zumwalt-class destroyer
  - USS Zumwalt (DDG-1000)
  - USS Michael Monsoor (DDG-1001)
  - USS Lyndon B. Johnson (DDG-1002) (Sea trials)
- DDG(X) (planned)

== Former classes ==
Australia

- Perth-class destroyer (decommissioned/sunk as dive wrecks)

Canada

- Iroquois-class destroyer (decommissioned/retired)

France

- These classes of French "frigates" had "D" pennant numbers and were destroyer-sized
- Suffren-class frigate
- Tourville-class frigate

Germany

- Hamburg-class destroyer (after refit to „Klasse 101A“) (decommissioned/scrapped)
- Lütjens-class destroyer (decommissioned/scrapped, except D 186 Mölders preserved as museum ship)

Italy

- Impavido-class destroyer (decommissioned/retired)
- Audace-class destroyer (decommissioned/retired)

Pakistan

- Tariq-class destroyer (decommissioned/sunk as targets)
- County-class destroyer (decommissioned/scrapped)

Japan

- Amatsukaze-class destroyer (decommissioned/retired)
- Tachikaze-class destroyer (decommissioned/retired)

Soviet Union

- Kotlin-class destroyer (decommissioned/scrapped)
- Kildin-class destroyer (decommissioned/scrapped)
- Kanin-class destroyer (decommissioned/retired)
- Kashin-class destroyer (decommissioned/retired)

United Kingdom

- County-class destroyer (decommissioned/scrapped/sunk)
- Type 82 destroyer (decommissioned)
- Type 42 destroyer (decommissioned/scrapped)

United States

- Farragut (Coontz)-class destroyer (decommissioned/scrapped)
- Charles F. Adams-class destroyer (all but one sunk for target or scrapped; one reserved for future preservation as museum ship)
- Ticonderoga-class cruiser was designated as the DDG-47 class in its early development, prior to the United States Navy 1975 ship reclassification, which made it the CG-47 class. The first Arleigh Burke-class destroyer was designated DDG-51, as the hull numbers DDG-47-50 had been used for Ticonderoga-class ships.
- Kidd-class destroyer (sold to Taiwan as Kee Lung-class destroyers)
