= YJ-15 =

Chinese anti-ship cruise missile

- Type: Anti-ship cruise missile Land-attack cruise missile Air-launched cruise missile
- Place of origin: China

Service history
- In service: c.2025–present
- Used by: People's Liberation Army Air Force; People's Liberation Army Navy

Production history
- Manufacturer: China Aerospace Science and Industry Corporation (CASIC)

Specifications
- Engine: ramjet engine with a four-inlet air-breathing design
- Operational range: 1,200–1,800 km (750–1,120 mi; 650–970 nmi)
- Maximum speed: Mach 5
- Guidance system: BeiDou satellite navigation with mid-course updates, terminal active radar homing
- Launch platform: Sea platform: Type 055 destroyer; Aerial platform: Shenyang J-15

The YJ-15 (Chinese: 鹰击-15; pinyin: Yīngjī-Yāowǔ; lit. 'eagle strike 15') is a supersonic anti-ship cruise missile powered by ramjet engines.

== History ==
The missile was first observed during the preparation of the 2025 China Victory Day Parade in August 2025. The missile was officially revealed at the Parade on 3 September 2025.

== Design ==
The YJ-15 is a supersonic anti-ship cruise missile powered by ramjet engines. The YJ-15 missile appears to be based on the YJ-12 supersonic anti-ship missile, which was already operational with the People's Liberation Army Navy (PLAN). The YJ-15 has a four-inlet design for its air-breathing engine.

== See also ==
- YJ-12
- YJ-17
- YJ-19
- YJ-20
- YJ-21
