= Chinese destroyer Dalian =

Chinese ship Dalian could refer to one of the following ships of the People's Liberation Army Navy which have been named for the city of Dalian.

- Chinese destroyer Dalian (110), a Type 051 destroyer commissioned in 1984 and retired in 2019
- Chinese destroyer Dalian (105), a Type 055 destroyer commissioned in 2021
