= YJ-19 =

Chinese hypersonic anti-ship cruise missile

The YJ-19 (Chinese: 鹰击-19; pinyin: Yīngjī-Yāojiǔ; lit. 'eagle strike 19') is a hypersonic anti-ship cruise missile powered by an air-breathing scramjet engine.

== History ==
The missile was first observed during the preparation of the 2025 China Victory Day Parade in August 2025. The missile was officially revealed at the Parade on 3 September 2025.

== Design ==
The YJ-19 is a hypersonic anti-ship cruise missile with an air-breathing scramjet engine, capable of providing sustained hypersonic flight and altering course mid-flight. The ventral air-intake can feed air into the engine, capable of powering sustained hypersonic flight at Mach 10 or higher. The missile can be fired from submarines, including from 533mm torpedo tubes.

== See also ==
- YJ-15
- YJ-17
- YJ-20
- YJ-21
