= YJ-17 =

Chinese hypersonic anti-ship missile

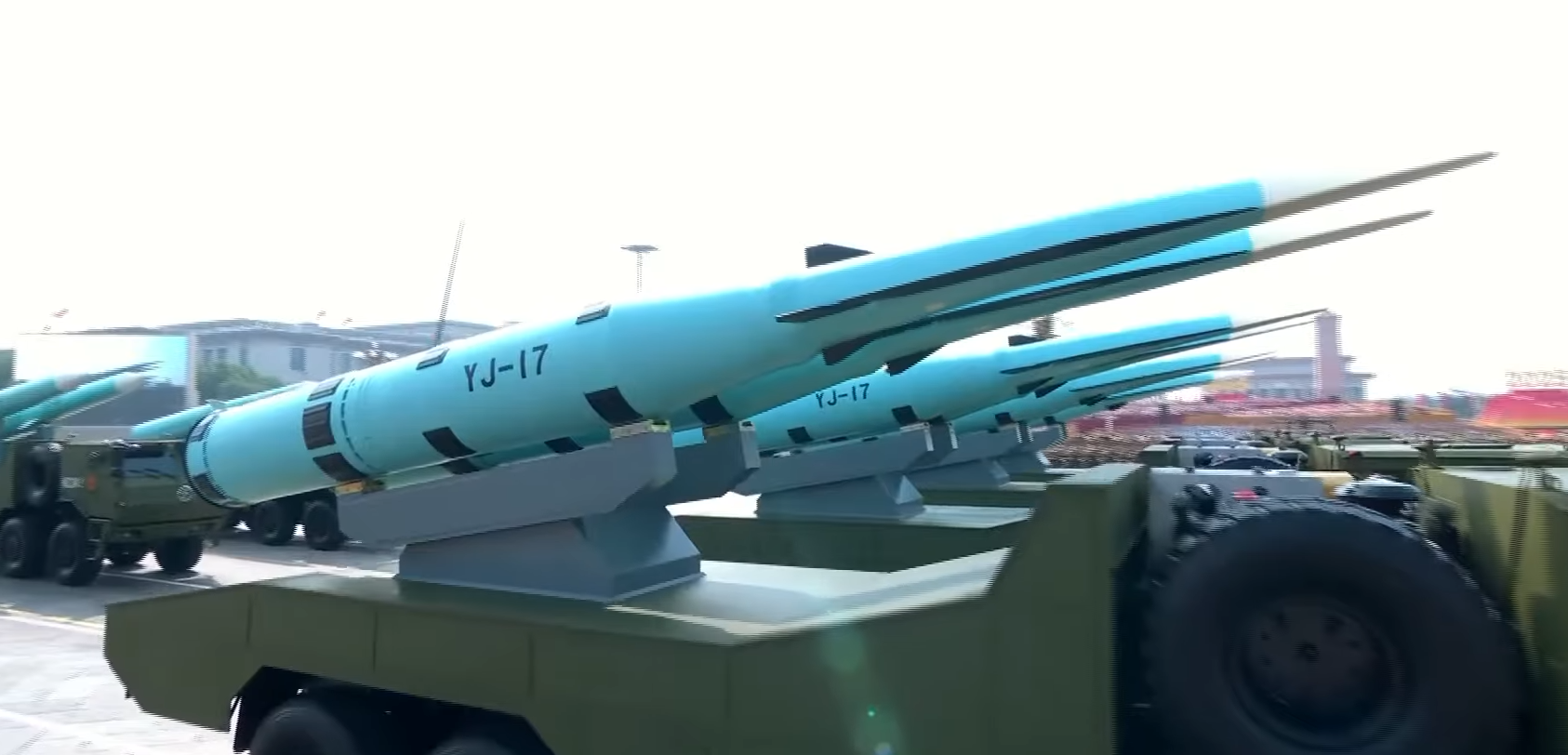
- Type: Hypersonic anti-ship aeroballistic missile with HGV
- Place of origin: China

Service history
- In service: 2025 - present

Specifications
- Launch platform: Surface ships

The YJ-17 (Chinese: 鹰击-17; pinyin: Yīngjī-Yāoqī; lit. 'eagle strike 17') is a hypersonic anti-ship aeroballistic missile, featuring a hypersonic glide vehicle (HGV) warhead. The missile was first observed during the preparation of the 2025 China Victory Day Parade in August 2025. The missile was officially revealed at the Parade on the 3rd of September, 2025.

== Design ==
The YJ-17 is a hypersonic anti-ship ballistic missile, featuring a hypersonic glide vehicle (HGV) mounted above the rocket booster stage. The HGV warhead would continue to glide to its target, maneuvering unpowered using aerodynamic forces. The YJ-17 appears to be based on the DF-17 missile, which was China's first operational ballistic missile featuring HGV. The flat warhead, characteristic of the boost-glide waverider configuration, can maneuver in the atmosphere, complicating the enemy interceptions from the missile defense system. The missile can be launched from surface ships.

== See also ==
- YJ-15
- YJ-19
- YJ-20
- YJ-21
