= YJ-20 =

Chinese anti-ship aeroballistic missile

- Type: Anti-ship ballistic missile
- Place of origin: China

Service history
- In service: 2025 - present
- Used by: People's Liberation Army Navy

Specifications
- Warhead: Conventional
- Operational range: approx. 1,500–2,000 kilometres (930–1,240 mi)
- Maximum speed: Mach 6 – Mach 10 (7,400–12,300 km/h)
- Launch platform: Sea platform: Type 052D destroyer; Type 055 destroyer

The YJ-20 (Chinese: 鹰击-20; pinyin: Yīngjī-Èrlíng; lit. 'eagle strike 20') is a anti-ship ballistic missile, featuring biconic aerodynamic configuration. The missile was first observed during the preparation of the 2025 China Victory Day Parade in August 2025. The missile was officially revealed at the Parade on 3 September 2025.

== History ==
In 2022, an unidentified hypersonic missile was revealed by the Chinese Navy ahead of its 73rd anniversary, launching from a universal vertical launching system of the Type 055 destroyer. The Chinese Navy did not reveal the missile's designation, but defense analysts at that time believed it to be the ship-launched version of the YJ-21. However, with the emergence of the YJ-20 hypersonic missile in 2025, which has a more closely aligned shape to the unidentified missile launched by Type 055, analysts believed these were two separate missile developments.

In December 2025, Chinese state media reported that YJ-20 had undergone a "finalization test" on the Type 055. In July 2026, Chinese media released footage of YJ-20 being launched by the Type 052D destroyer. The capability to launch hypersonic missiles from relatively smaller platforms, such as the Type 052D, means the PLA Navy can distribute its firepower to a large percentage of the fleet force.

== Design ==
The YJ-20 is a hypersonic anti-ship ballistic missile, featuring a biconic aerodynamic configuration. The configuration allows for manoeuvrable re-entry after its initial ballistic launch. The missile can be launched from surface vessels. The missile has an estimated range of 1,000–1,500 km (620–930 mi; 540–810 nmi).

== See also ==
- YJ-15
- YJ-17
- YJ-19
- YJ-21
