= CM-401 =

Chinese anti-ship missile

The CM-401 is a type of supersonic anti-ship ballistic missile developed by the China Aerospace Science and Industry Corporation (CASIC), revealed at Zhuhai Airshow 2018. The missile's form is likely derived from the C-602 missile. The missile is an anti-ship ballistic missile with a range of up to 290 km (180 mi) and a terminal active radar homing, skip-glide strike with a speed of Mach 4 to Mach 6. Though the skip-glide trajectory can extend the missile's range, which is reportedly achieved by a variant of the missile, CM-401 uses the trajectory to achieve irregular terminal maneuvers.
