= Telesforo Trinidad =

Medal of Honor recipient

- Trinidad wearing his Medal of Honor
- Born: November 25, 1890; Aklan, Philippines
- Died: May 8, 1968 (aged 77); Imus, Cavite, Philippines
- Military career
- Allegiance: United States
- Branch: United States Navy
- Rank: Fireman 2nd Class
- Unit: USS San Diego
- Conflicts: World War I World War II
- Awards: Medal of Honor

Telesforo de la Cruz Trinidad (November 25, 1890 – May 8, 1968) was a Filipino fireman 2nd class in the United States Navy who received the Medal of Honor for actions in Mexican waters near La Paz, on board the USS San Diego on 21 January 1915. He is the second service member, and first and so far only sailor of Asian descent to receive the award in peacetime. Trinidad served during both World Wars before retiring to the Philippines and living on his pension.

On May 20, 2022, Navy Secretary Carlos del Toro announced that a future Arleigh Burke-class guided-missile destroyer will be named USS Telesforo Trinidad.

== Medal of Honor citation ==
Rank and organization: Fireman Second Class, U.S. Navy. Born: 25 November 1890, New Washington Capiz, Philippine Islands. Accredited to: Philippine Islands. G.O. No.: 142, 1 April 1915.

Citation:

For extraordinary heroism in the line of his profession at the time of the boiler explosion on board the U.S.S. San Diego, 21 January 1915. Trinidad was driven out of fireroom No. 2 by the explosion, but at once returned and picked up R.E. Daly, fireman, second class, whom he saw to be injured, and proceeded to bring him out. While coming into No. 4 fireroom, Trinidad was just in time to catch the explosion in No. 3 fireroom, but without consideration for his own safety, passed Daly on and then assisted in rescuing another injured man from No. 3 fireroom. Trinidad was himself burned about the face by the blast from the explosion in No. 3 fireroom.

== See also ==
- List of Asian American Medal of Honor recipients
- List of Medal of Honor recipients in non-combat incidents
- Robert Webster Cary - Received Medal of Honor during the same incident
