= Dual-purpose gun =

Class of naval artillery for engaging both air and surface targets

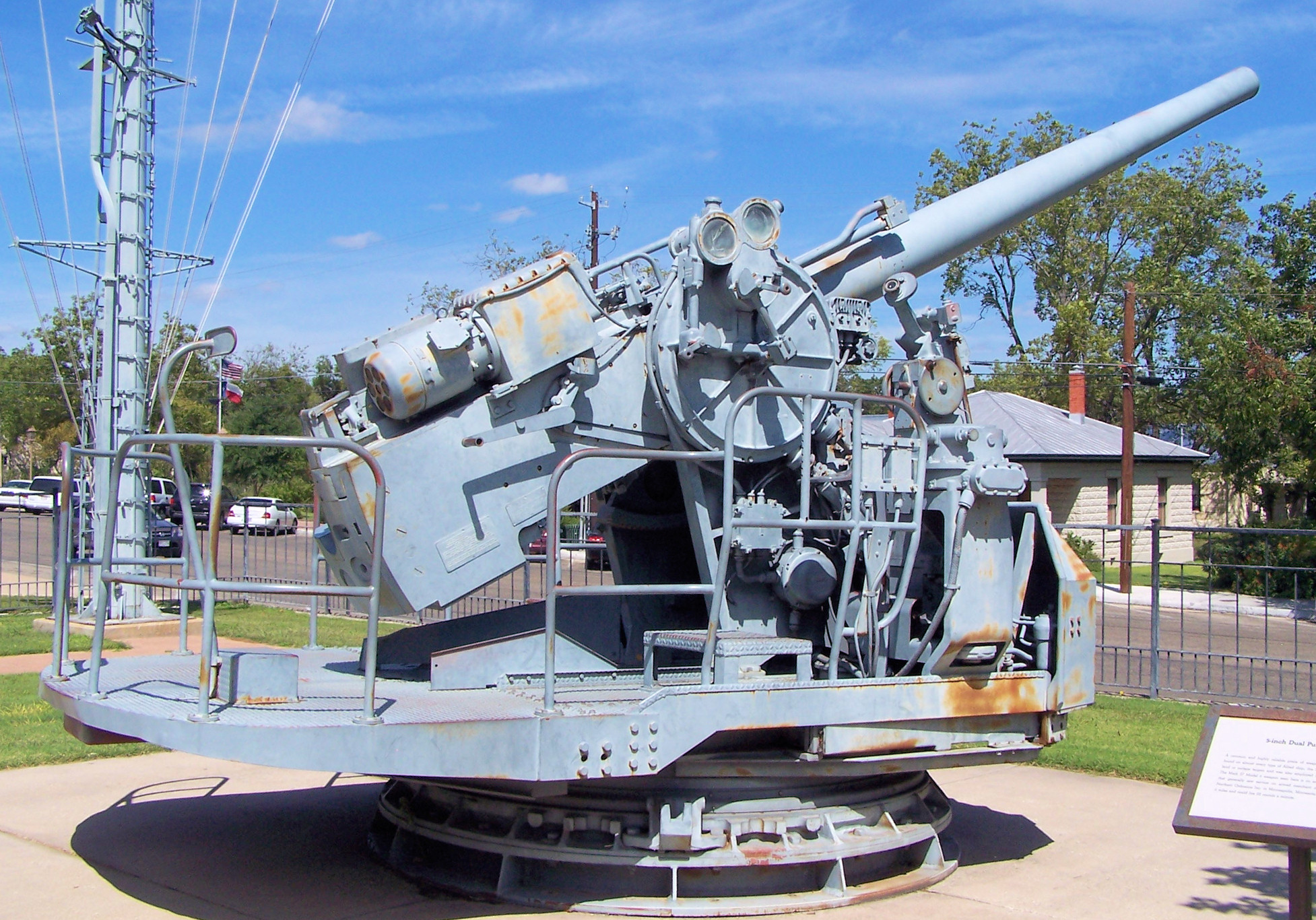
The Mark 37 Modification 6 5-inch dual-purpose gun on display at the National Museum of the Pacific War. The gun had a range of over 6 miles and could fire 22 rounds a minute.

A dual-purpose gun is a naval artillery mounting designed to engage both surface and air targets.

== Description ==
Second World War-era capital ships had four classes of artillery: the heavy main battery, intended to engage opposing battleships and cruisers of 305 mm to 457 mm (12 inch to 18 inch); a secondary battery for use against enemy destroyers of 152 mm to 203 mm (6 inch to 8 inch); heavy anti-aircraft guns of 76 mm to 127 mm (3 inch to 5 inch), which could create barrages to knock out airplanes at a distance; finally, light rapid-fire anti-aircraft batteries (A/A) to track and bring down aircraft at close range. The light A/A was dispersed throughout the ship and included both automatic cannons of 20 mm to 40 mm (.787 inch to 1.57 inch) and heavy machine guns of 12.7 mm to 14.5 mm (.50 inch to .58 inch).

During World War II, the US Navy, Royal Navy, the French Navy, and the Imperial Japanese Navy combined the secondary battery with the heavy anti-aircraft guns, creating a dual-purpose secondary battery. They discarded the dedicated, anti-ship secondary batteries altogether, because a battle-line fleet would be screened against cruisers and destroyers most of the time. Also, it was deemed unlikely that a battleship would be simultaneously facing both rushing destroyers and aircraft, and it would take up too much space to have separate types of guns to deal with both threats. Rather, they replaced them with turret-mounted dual-purpose guns that could be used against both aircraft and ships. The space saved from combining the two types of guns added to simplification of supply, increased deck armour coverage, stowage of other equipment, a larger light anti-aircraft battery, and other needs. This arrangement was seen as more efficient, and was deemed adequate to meet anti-surface and anti-aircraft needs under most circumstances.

The Kriegsmarine, in a practice similar to the Italian and Soviet navies, adopted a mixed-calibre secondary battery, with dedicated anti-ship guns, coupled with smaller-calibre heavy anti-aircraft batteries, instead of adopting dual-purpose secondaries like the British or Americans. Both navies were concerned by possible close-range torpedo attacks from enemy (in particular, French) destroyers and torpedo boats, and considered the more powerful, larger calibre anti-ship secondaries a must. The French Navy used a mixed-calibre system, as well, but their secondary battery was dual-purpose. This tended to complicate ammunition supplies and render certain armament useless in some situations.

Dual-purpose guns are designed as a compromise between the heavy main armament of a surface combatant and dedicated anti-aircraft guns. Usually of a mid-range caliber, the gun is heavy enough to prove useful against surface targets including ships, surfaced submarines, and land targets. However, it is compact enough to fit into a mounting capable of good traverse and high elevation, as well as being capable of a high rate of fire, allowing it to successfully engage air targets at all angles. For example, a Royal Navy battleship of the King George V class had sixteen QF Mark I 5.25-inch (133 mm) guns that could engage either enemy ships or high level aircraft, as necessary.

Not all dual-purpose guns have high elevation. The determining factor was whether or not the mounting was provided with an anti-aircraft fire control system and a method for setting the time fuze in the A.A. warhead, fired by the gun. Starting with the Tribal class, the Royal Navy introduced a series of destroyer classes that had dual-purpose guns, but in 4.7 inch QF Mark XII, twin CP Mk. XIX and later mountings limited to 40, 50 or 55 degrees elevation, however, the guns were controlled by an A.A. fire control system and the mountings were provided with A.A. shell fuze setters. The USN had developed a similar class of destroyer, the Porter class with eight Mk 12 5-inch/38-caliber (127 mm) guns in four Mark 22 Single Purpose (surface action only) twin mounts, limited to 35 degrees elevation, but with no provision for A.A. fire control and no on-mount fuze setters. The 40-degree elevation did limit the ability of the Tribal class guns to engage dive and high altitude bombers but they were still effective in engaging low altitude, level, and torpedo bombers and could still provide barrage fire over other ships being attacked by dive bombers. Admiral Sir Philip Vian describes the use of 4.7 inch Mark XII guns against aircraft during the 1940 campaign in Norway:

"It became clear at once that in an attack from the air in narrow waters flanked by mountains, the cards were held by the aircraft. There was too little sea-room for full freedom of manoeuvre, and the aircraft's approach was screened by the rock walls. As often as not, when they did come into view it was at such an angle that our 4.7-inch guns, whose maximum elevation was only forty degrees, could not reach them...Aandalsnes is approached through the Romsdal Fiord, and lies forty miles from the entrance, off which we arrived on the 24th April. The daylight passage of the convoy and escort through this waterway, speed five knots, on a steady course and with mountains rising steeply either side, presented an alluring invitation to enemy aircraft. Junkers attacks persisted to the end, but the fire of the destroyers, although limited to an elevation of forty degrees, was enough to keep the enemy just too high for their standard of marksmanship. Not a ship received a direct hit, though some were damaged by the splinters from near misses."

Dual-purpose guns, often abbreviated to DP guns, were originally designed as a secondary armament for large surface ships such as cruisers and battleships to complement their heavy main armaments. Later, such guns began to be added to smaller vessels as their primary gun armament, and with the progression of ship design away from heavy-caliber guns, today nearly all main gun armaments are of dual-purpose nature.

Most modern dual-purpose guns are in the 76 mm to 127 mm (3-inch to 5-inch) medium-caliber range.

In British service the term HA/LA for "High Angle/Low Angle" was used.

== List of dual-purpose guns ==
Calibre	Weapon name	Country of origin	Period
40 millimetres (1.6 in)	Bofors 40 mm L/60 gun	Sweden	1930s–present
40 millimetres (1.6 in)	Bofors 40 mm Automatic Gun L/70	Sweden	1940s–present
57 millimetres (2.2 in)	Finspång 57 mm QF naval gun L/55 model 1889	Sweden-Norway	1890s–present
57 millimetres (2.2 in)	Bofors 57 mm naval gun L/21 model 1916	Sweden	1910s–Cold War
57 millimetres (2.2 in)	Bofors 57 mm Naval Automatic Gun L/60	Sweden	1952–1990
57 millimetres (2.2 in)	Bofors 57 mm Naval Automatic Gun L/70	Sweden	1970–present
76.2 millimetres (3 in)	76 mm/62 Allargato	Italy	1962–present
76.2 millimetres (3 in)	OTO Melara 76 mm	Italy	1964–present
76.2 millimetres (3 in)	AK-176	Soviet Union	1976–present
100 millimetres (3.9 in)	10 cm/65 Type 98 naval gun	Japan	World War II
100 millimetres (3.9 in)	Type 79 100 mm naval gun	People's Republic of China	1973–present
100 millimetres (3.9 in)	100 mm naval gun	France	1961–present
100 millimetres (3.9 in)	AK-100 naval gun	Soviet Union	1978–present
4 inches (101.6 mm)	QF 4 inch Mk V naval gun	United Kingdom	1914–1940s
4 inches (101.6 mm)	QF 4 inch Mk XVI naval gun	United Kingdom	1936–1950s
4 inches (101.6 mm)	QF 4 inch Mk XIX naval gun	United Kingdom	World War II
4.45 inches (113 mm)	QF 4.5-inch Mk I – V naval gun	United Kingdom	1938–Cold War
4.45 inches (113 mm)	4.5-inch Mk 8 naval gun	United Kingdom	1972–present
120 millimetres (4.7 in)	Bofors 120 mm Naval Automatic Gun L/50	Sweden	1952–1985
4.7 inches (119 mm)	QF 4.7-inch Mk IX & XII	United Kingdom	1928–1970
4.7 inches (119 mm)	QF 4.7 inch Mark XI gun	United Kingdom	1941–1970
127 millimetres (5 in)	Otobreda 127mm/54 compact gun	Italy	Cold War–present
127 millimetres (5 in)	Otobreda 127mm/64 gun	Italy	2012–present
127 millimetres (5 in)	12.7 cm/50 Type 3 naval gun	Japan	1928–1966
127 millimetres (5.0 in)	12.7 cm/40 Type 89 naval gun	Japan	1932-1945
5 inches (127 mm)	5"/38-caliber gun	United States	1934–1990s
5 inches (127 mm)	5"/54-caliber Mk 16 gun	United States	1945–1993
5 inches (127 mm)	5"/54-caliber Mark 42 gun	United States	1953–present
5 inches (127 mm)	5"/54-caliber Mk 45 gun	United States	1971–present
5 inches (127 mm)	5"/62-caliber Mk 45 gun	United States	2000–present
130 millimetres (5.1 in)	Type H/PJ38 130 mm naval gun	People's Republic of China	2014–present
130 millimetres (5.1 in)	Canon de 130 mm Modèle 1932 et 1935	France	1935-1942
5.25 inches (133 mm)	QF 5.25-inch Mk 1 gun	United Kingdom	1940–1966
135 millimetres (5.3 in)	135mm/45 gun	Italy	1940–1972
138.6 millimetres (5.46 in)	Canon de 138 mm Modèle 1929	France	1934–1954
6 inches (152 mm)	6"/47-caliber Mk 16 gun	United States	1937–1992

== See also ==
- List of artillery
