= USS Ray Mabus =

Guided missile destroyer

History

United States
- Name: Ray Mabus
- Namesake: Ray Mabus
- Builder: Ingalls Shipbuilding
- Identification: Hull number: DDG-147
- Status: Authorized for construction

General characteristics
- Class & type: Arleigh Burke-class destroyer
- Displacement: 9,217 tons (full load)
- Length: 510 ft (160 m)
- Beam: 66 ft (20 m)
- Propulsion: 4 × General Electric LM2500 gas turbines 100,000 shp (75,000 kW)
- Speed: 31 knots (57 km/h; 36 mph)
- Complement: 380 officers and enlisted
- Armament: Guns: 1 × 5-inch (127 mm)/62 Mk 45 Mod 4 (lightweight gun); 1 × 20 mm (0.8 in) Phalanx CIWS; 2 × 25 mm (0.98 in) Mk 38 machine gun system; 4 × 0.50 in (12.7 mm) caliber guns; Missiles: 1 × 32-cell, 1 × 64-cell (96 total cells) Mk 41 vertical launching system (VLS): RIM-66M surface-to-air missile; RIM-156 surface-to-air missile; RIM-174A Standard ERAM; RIM-161 anti-ballistic missile; RIM-162 ESSM (quad-packed); BGM-109 Tomahawk cruise missile; RUM-139 vertical launch ASROC; Torpedoes: 2 × Mark 32 triple torpedo tubes: Mark 46 lightweight torpedo; Mark 50 lightweight torpedo; Mark 54 lightweight torpedo
- Armor: Kevlar-type armor with steel hull. Numerous passive survivability measures.
- Aircraft carried: 2 × MH-60R Seahawk helicopters
- Aviation facilities: Double hangar and helipad

USS Ray Mabus (DDG-147) is the planned 97th Arleigh Burke-class (Flight III) Aegis guided missile destroyer of the United States Navy. She is named for former Navy Secretary Ray Mabus. The flight III variant will be built by Ingalls Shipbuilding.

== Naming ==
She is named for the 75th United States Secretary of the Navy, Ray Mabus, who served in the role from 2009 to 2017, both the longest term in almost 100 years and the first to serve the entire eight-year term of his president in that time as well. Mabus also served as a surface warfare officer in the Navy from 1970 to 1972, after finishing his undergraduate degree and before attending Harvard Law School.

=== Historical background ===
Mabus first entered politics as the State auditor of Mississippi, then went on to become governor of Mississippi from 1988 to 1992. Shortly after that he went on to be the United States Ambassador to Saudi Arabia from 1994 to 1996. He then returned home to practice law until 2008 when he campaigned for Barack Obama. Following Obama's victory, Mabus was successfully nominated for Secretary of the Navy.

Mabus made several progressive changes that were both applauded and criticized by many in the government and the United States Department of the Navy. He pushed to have ships run on alternative fuels and he made changes to the ship naming customs, to recognize more women and minorities, civil rights activists and people in government who were leaders away from the battlefield. He also pushed for more desegregation among the genders, including gender-neutral titles, co-ed training in the Marines, and the first women to serve on submarines.

President Obama tasked Mabus with designing a plan to aid the recovery of the Gulf Coast following the Deepwater Horizon oil spill disaster. He turned in a plan that was the basis of the $5 billion RESTORE Act. Mabus was repeatedly at odds with his superiors and lawmakers over budget issues, but was able to contract the building of 86 vessels during his tenure.
