= Chinese ship Guilin =

Two Chinese navy ships are named after the city of Guilin;

- Chinese destroyer Guilin (1987), a Type 051 destroyer commissioned in 1987 and decommissioned in 2019 with the pennant number 164
- Chinese destroyer Guilin (2021), a Type 052D destroyer commissioned in 2021 also with the pennant number 164
