= Chinese destroyer Lhasa =

Type 055 destroyer of the PLA Navy

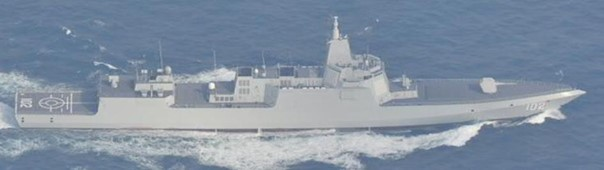
- Lhasa underway on 13 December 2022

History

China
- Name: Lhasa
- Namesake: Lhasa; (拉萨)
- Builder: Jiangnan Shipyard, Shanghai
- Launched: 28 April 2018
- Commissioned: 7 March 2021
- Identification: Pennant number: 102
- Status: Active

General characteristics
- Class & type: Type 055 destroyer
- Displacement: 12-13,000 tonnes (full load)
- Length: 180 m (590 ft 7 in)
- Beam: 20 m (65 ft 7 in)
- Draught: 6.6 m (21 ft 8 in)
- Installed power: 6 × QD-50 turbine generators (5 MW (6,700 hp) each); Total: 30 MW (40,000 shp)
- Propulsion: COGAG; 4 × QC-280 gas turbines (28 MW (38,000 hp) each); Total: 112 MW (150,000 shp)
- Speed: 30 knots (56 km/h; 35 mph)
- Range: 5,000 nmi (9,300 km)
- Complement: 300+
- Sensors & processing systems: Type 346B (C/S-band) radar; X-band radar
- Electronic warfare & decoys: Electronic warfare system
- Armament: 1 × H/PJ-38 130 mm gun; 1 × H/PJ-11 CIWS; 1 × HQ-10 short-range SAM 24-cell launcher; 112 VLS; HHQ-9 surface-to-air missiles; YJ-18 anti-ship cruise missiles; CJ-10 land-attack cruise missiles; Missile-launched anti-submarine torpedoes; 2 x sets; Yu-7 torpedoes
- Aircraft carried: 2 medium-lift helicopters; Harbin Z-9; Changhe Z-18
- Aviation facilities: Stern hangar; Helicopter landing platform

Lhasa (102) is a Type 055 destroyer of the People's Liberation Army Navy (PLAN). She was commissioned on 7 March 2021.

== Development and design ==
The PLAN was interested in a large destroyer from as early as the late 1960s. A development program, code-named "055", initiated in 1976, was cancelled in 1983 after encountering insurmountable technical obstacles from industrial underdevelopment; for example, the required gas turbine power plants could neither be produced domestically, nor imported at acceptable prices. In April 2014, an image emerged of a full-scale mock-up of the Type 055 superstructure - with enclosed integrated mast for radar and other electronics at the Chinese naval electronic testing range in Wuhan.

The Type 055 is expected to undertake expeditionary missions and form the primary escort for Chinese aircraft carriers. The United States classifies these ships as cruisers. The United States Navy defines a cruiser as a large multi-mission surface combatant with flagship capabilities; this suggests the U.S. expects the Type 055 to fulfill a similar role as the Ticonderoga-class cruiser.

== Construction and career ==
Lhasa was the second ship of the class to be laid down and was launched on 28 April 2018 at the Jiangnan Shipyard in Shanghai. On 27 January 2021, she was spotted at Hainan Island with hull number 102. The ship was commissioned on 7 March 2021 and assigned to the North Sea Fleet. The Tibetan newspaper Lhasa Daily reported that Vice Mayor of Lhasa Zheng Weiguo traveled to the Qingdao military base to visit the officers and sailors of Lhasa.

In January 2022, Chinese state media reported Lhasa as being "combat-ready". In July 2022 Lhasa took part in her first far-sea exercises, in which she circumnavigated Japan.
