= Chinese destroyer Dalian (105) =

Type 055 destroyer of the PLA Navy

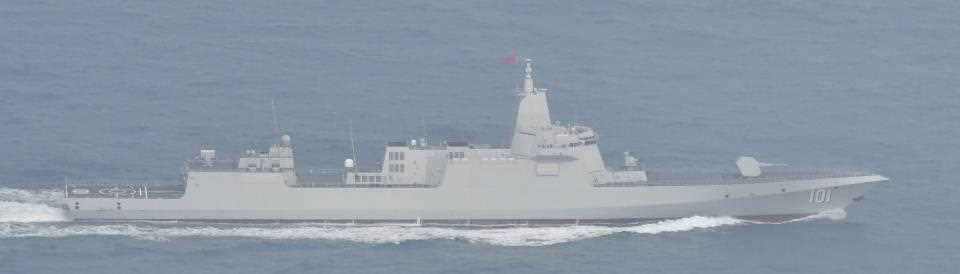
- Sister ship Nanchang

History

China
- Name: Dalian
- Namesake: Dalian (大连)
- Builder: Dalian Shipyard, Liaoning
- Launched: 3 July 2018
- Commissioned: 23 April 2021
- Identification: Pennant number: 105
- Motto: "Loyal, Victorious, Hard Working, Exceeding" (Chinese: 忠诚，胜战，实干，超越)
- Status: Active
- Badge: See #Ship Badge

General characteristics
- Class & type: Type 055 destroyer
- Displacement: 12-13,000 tonnes (full load)
- Length: 180 m (590 ft 7 in)
- Beam: 20 m (65 ft 7 in)
- Draught: 6.6 m (21 ft 8 in)
- Installed power: 6 × QD-50 turbine generators (5 MW (6,700 hp) each); Total: 30 MW (40,000 shp)
- Propulsion: COGAG; 4 × QC-280 gas turbines (28 MW (38,000 hp) each); Total: 112 MW (150,000 shp)
- Speed: 30 knots (56 km/h; 35 mph)
- Range: 5,000 nmi (9,300 km)
- Complement: 300+
- Sensors & processing systems: Type 346B (C/S-band) radar; X-band radar
- Electronic warfare & decoys: Electronic warfare system
- Armament: 1 × H/PJ-38 130 mm gun; 1 × H/PJ-11 CIWS; 1 × HQ-10 short-range SAM 24-cell launcher; 112 VLS; HHQ-9 surface-to-air missiles; YJ-18 anti-ship cruise missiles; CJ-10 land-attack cruise missiles; Missile-launched anti-submarine torpedoes; 2 x sets; Yu-7 torpedoes
- Aircraft carried: 2 medium-lift helicopters; Harbin Z-9; Changhe Z-18
- Aviation facilities: Stern hangar; Helicopter landing platform

Dalian (105) is a Type 055 destroyer of the People's Liberation Army Navy. She was commissioned on 23 April 2021.

== Development and design ==
The People's Liberation Army Navy was interested in a large destroyer from as early as the late-1960s. A development program, code-named "055", initiated in 1976 was cancelled in 1983 after encountering insurmountable technical obstacles from industrial underdevelopment; for example, the required gas turbine power plants could neither be produced domestically, nor imported at acceptable prices. In April 2014, an image emerged of a full-scale mock-up of the Type 055 superstructure - with enclosed integrated mast for radar and other electronics at the Chinese naval electronic testing range in Wuhan.

The Type 055 is expected to undertake expeditionary missions and form the primary escort for Chinese aircraft carriers. The United States classifies these ships as cruisers. The United States Navy defines a cruiser as a large multi-mission surface combatant with flagship capabilities; this suggests the U.S. expects the Type 055 to fulfill a similar role as the Ticonderoga-class cruiser.

== Construction and career ==
Dalian is the third ship of the class and laid down and launched on 8 July 2018 at the Dalian Shipyard in Liaoning. On 23 April 2021, the ship was commissioned by Central Military Commission chairman Xi Jinping at The Yulin Naval Base at in a ceremony that coincided with the 72nd anniversary of the PLAN.

== Ship Badge ==
The ship badge of the Dalian features the words "People's Liberation Army Navy Ship Dalian"(Chinese: 中国人民解放军海军大连舰) at the top, and then has its motto "Loyal, Victorious, Hard Working, Exceeding" (Chinese: 忠诚, 胜战, 实干, 超越) below.

Ship badge of the Dalian
- https://web.archive.org/web/20250222074513im_/https://gfjy.ahnews.com.cn/gfsp/pic/2023-04/24/824304_c22423d1-b4d6-43a4-9e80-f534e34ac3a8.png
