= Anti-ship ballistic missile =

Type of anti-ship weapon

An anti-ship ballistic missile (ASBM) is a military ballistic missile system designed to hit a warship at sea.

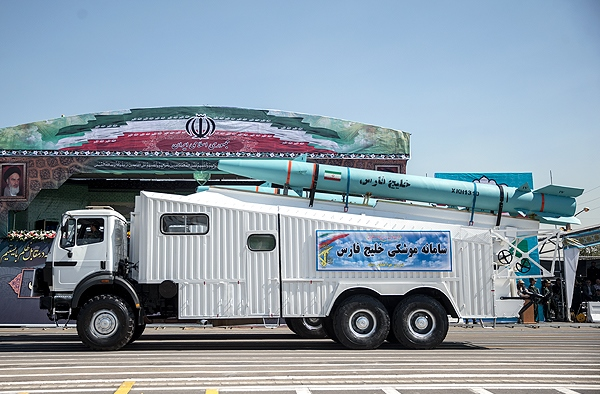
Iranian Persian Gulf anti-ship ballistic missile

Due to the high flight speed of ballistic missiles, an ASBM's kinetic energy alone may be sufficient to cripple or outright destroy a target with a single conventional warhead impact. Unlike a nuclear warhead, however, this would require a direct hit to be effective; therefore unlike a land attack ballistic missile, which typically strikes fixed targets in known positions, an ASBM requires a dedicated sensor chain to detect and identify its target, combined with a precise and high-performance terminal guidance system with advanced sensors and in-flight calibrations in order to successfully hit a moving target.

== History ==
=== First operational use in war ===
In late November 2023, during the Red Sea crisis caused by the continuation of the Gaza war, the United States Central Command (CENTCOM) in the Middle East reported that two ballistic missiles had been fired at the United States Navy Arleigh Burke-class destroyer USS Mason from areas controlled by Yemeni Houthi movement. In January 2024, at the same time as US and British airstrikes on Yemen, US President Joe Biden confirmed that the Yemenis had used ASBMs for the "first time in history".

- Possibly the first ship ever hit by an ASBM was the Liberian-flagged MV Palatium 3. Afterwards, the ASBMs seem to have scored several hits on merchant vessels. The vessels that were hit are:
  - MV Swan Atlantic
  - MV Gibraltar Eagle
  - MV Zografia
  - MV Marlin Luanda
  - Greek-owned bulk carrier Star Nasia
  - MV Rubymar
- A drone and an ASBM were launched at Swan Atlantic.
- The missile that struck Gibraltar Eagle caused no casualties or significant damage.
- The missile that struck Zografia impacted midship; a video of the hit is available online. Zografia remained seaworthy.
- The missile that struck Marlin Luanda caused a fire.
- The Star Nasia reported an explosion near the ship causing minor damage but no injuries.
- The Rubymar, according to CENTCOM, was struck by a Houthi anti-ship ballistic missile on 18 February 2024, causing the crew to abandon ship. The vessel then slowly took on water until finally sinking on 2 March 2024.
- At approximately 11:30 a.m. (Sanaa time) 6 March 2024, an ASBM was launched from Yemen by the Ansar Allah toward MV True Confidence, while transiting the Gulf of Aden. According to CENTCOM, there were at least three confirmed casualties of the multinational crew with few more severe injuries.

== Countermeasures ==
The United States Navy fields what some experts believe to be the best midcourse anti-ballistic defence in the world, and is developing high powered lasers for terminal-defence against anti-ship ballistic missiles. The U.S. arsenal has a variety of potential countermeasures. According to a senior political scientist at the RAND Corporation, Roger Cliff, an anti-ship ballistic missile is not useful without additional complex ship detection, data processing and communication systems, all of which, including the missile itself, could be jammed or spoofed.

During Operation Prosperity Guardian, the first combat shootdown of an ASBM was achieved by the destroyer USS Laboon on 26 December 2023. By 9 January, a total of seven Houthi ASBMs had been successfully intercepted by the U.S. Navy. On 24 January 2024, USS Gravely shot down two Houthi ASBMs. On 26 January 2024, USS Carney also successfully intercepted a Houthi ASBM.

== Operators ==
=== Soviet Union ===
The former Soviet Union introduced the world's first intermediate-range ballistic anti-ship missile, initially called 4K18, which was modified from the R-27K, where "K" stands for korabelnaya which means "ship-related" with NATO reporting name: SS-NX-13. Initially, the Soviet Navy began testing on their submarines on 9 December 1972, first on board K-102, a Golf-class submarine. Test firings were carried out between 11 September and 4 December 1973. Following the initial trials, the K-102 continued making trial launches with both the R-27 and the R-27K, until it was accepted for service on 15 August 1975.

Using external targeting data, the R-27K would have been launched underwater to a range of between 350 and 400 nautical miles (650 and 740 km), covering a "footprint" of 27 nmi (50 km). The maneuvering re-entry vehicle (MaRV) would then home-in on the target with a circular error probable (CEP) of 400 yards (370 m). Warhead yield was between 0.5–1 megatonnes.

The Russian R-27K was the world's first anti-ship ballistic missile. However, it never became operational, since every launch tube used for the R-27K counted as a strategic missile in the SALT agreement with the United States, and they were considered more important.

=== China ===
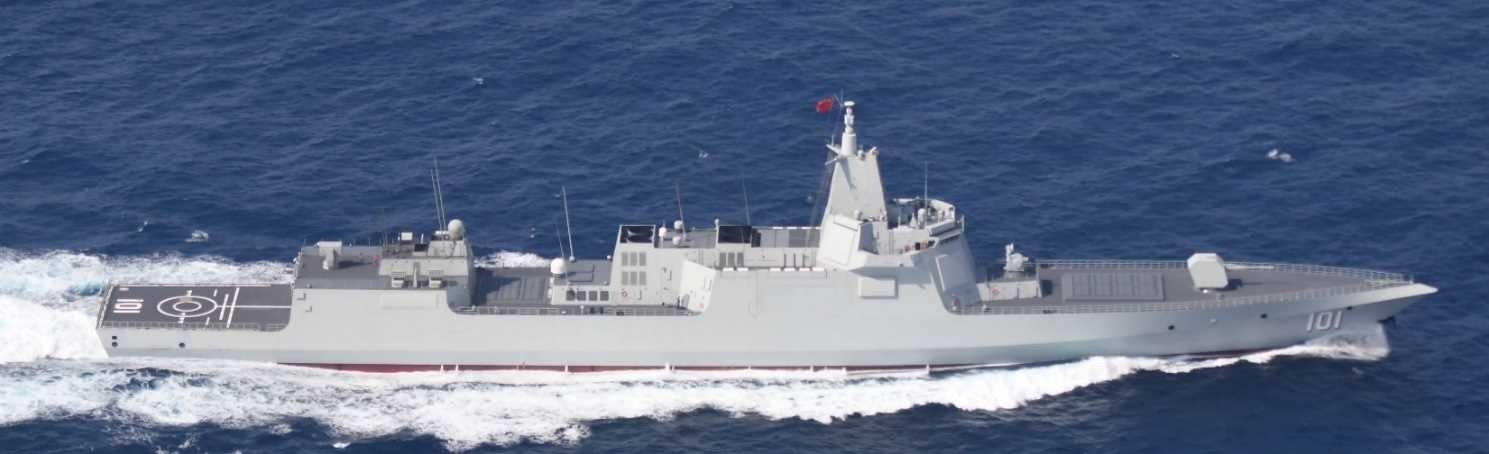
Chinese Type 055 destroyer

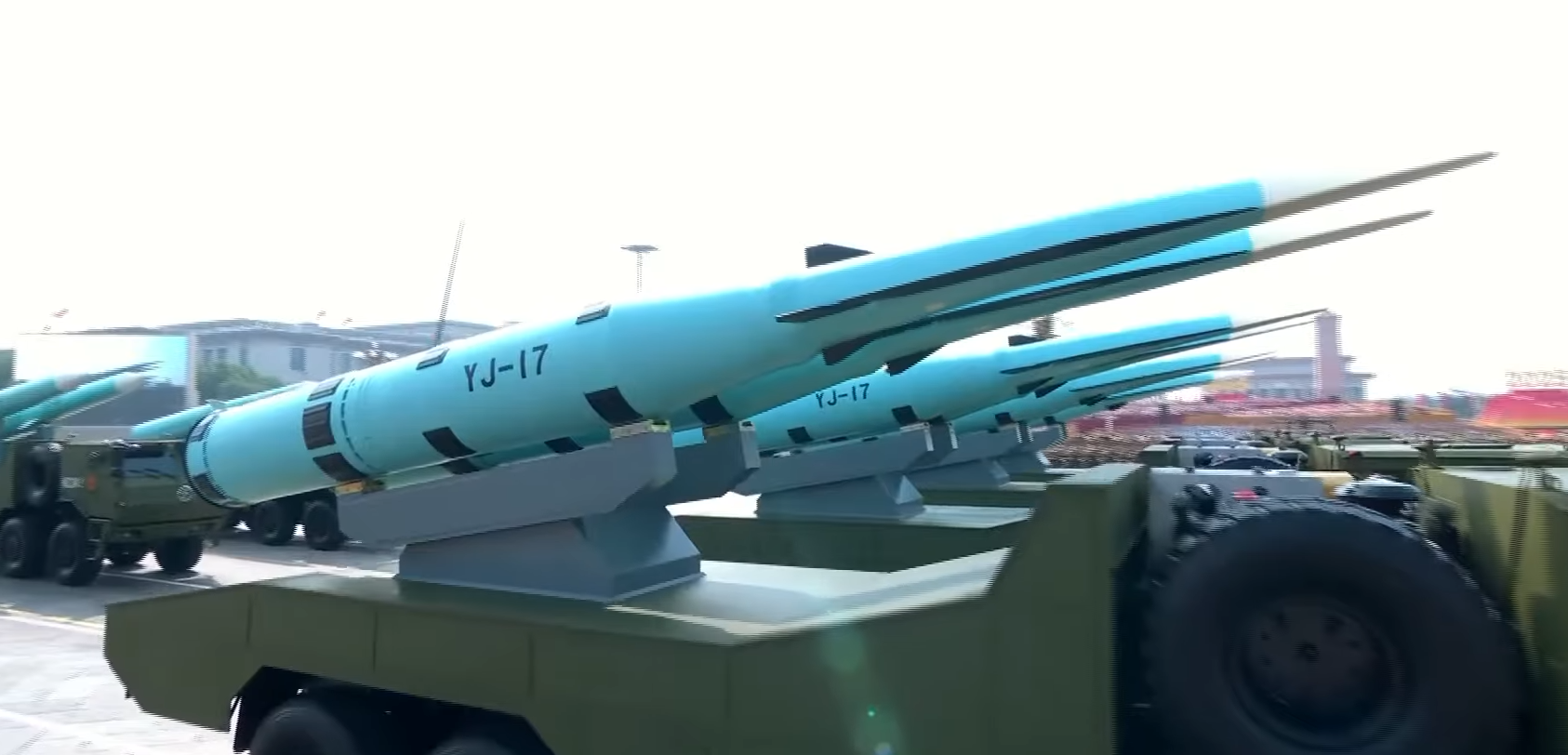
YJ-17 is a hypersonic anti-ship ballistic missile, featuring a hypersonic glide vehicle (HGV) warhead

China has inducted the world's first operational anti-ship ballistic missile, a "carrier killer" capable of carrying both conventional and nuclear warheads, known as the DF-21D. In 2010, it was reported that Chinese People's Liberation Army Navy had entered the DF-21D into its early operational stage for deployment.

The DF-26, first revealed on the Victory Day Parade in 2015, is also able to carry anti-ship warheads, possibly hypersonic glide vehicles like the DF-ZF, to attack medium and large naval vessels out to ranges of 3,500–5,000 kilometres (2,200–3,100 mi).

China is apparently working on a second-generation ASBM using hypersonic maneuverable reentry vehicle technology tested on the DF-ZF. This would allow the warhead to search for the current location of the carrier, instead of just dropping towards the predicted spot it was initially aiming at. The high speed maneuvers would also make the missile much harder to intercept. Type 055 destroyers are armed with the YJ-21 anti-ship ballistic missiles along with the YJ-18 anti-ship cruise missiles in GJB 5860-2006 vertical launch system.

=== India ===
Between 2007 and 2009, the Indian Navy carried out the successful trials of Dhanush (lit. Bow) ballistic missiles, which is a naval variant of the Prithvi-III missile, for anti-ship roles. The Indian Navy currently operates the Dhanush which has a range of 750 km (470 mi).

=== Iran ===
In February 2011, Iran demonstrated a short-range anti-ship ballistic missile named Persian Gulf or Khalij Fars based on the Fateh-110, which were fired from the land-based missile vehicle that successfully hit a stationary target vessel from the coast. It has been reported as a short ranged ballistic missile with a range of 250–300 km (160–190 mi).

Later, Iran introduced the Hormuz missile with anti-ship capability also being launched from the land platform. In 2020, Iran unveiled the Zolfaqar Basir, an anti-ship variant of the Zolfaghar with a range of 700 km (430 mi).

=== Pakistan ===
In November 2024, the Pakistan Navy successfully conducted a flight test of an anti-ship ballistic missile, the P282 SMASH, which has an officially stated range of 350 km (220 mi), hitting a land-based target. The P282 SMASH was test fired from one of the Zulfiquar-class frigates and was reported to be equipped with advanced controlled navigation and maneuverability features, capable of striking land targets with high precision at that time. In early 2020, it was rumoured in nation's media that the navy's weapons development complex, the Maritime Technologies Complex (MTC), was reportedly working on developing the rocket engine and the control system software.

In November 2025, Pakistan Navy carried another test from one of the Tughril-class frigate, hitting a sea-based target this time. The P282 SMASH has been deployed on at least one of Pakistan's Zulfiquar-class frigates and Tughril-class frigates.

=== Turkey ===
In July 2026, Türkiye publicly demonstrated an anti-ship capability for the TAYFUN Block-3 ballistic missile by successfully striking a moving surface target during a live-fire test over the Black Sea. According to the Presidency of Defence Industries (SSB), ROKETSAN and Anadolu Agency, the missile employed a terminal seeker guidance system to engage and destroy an approximately 7 m unmanned surface vessel representing a small fishing boat. The test used a live warhead and marked the first publicly announced integration of a seeker into the TAYFUN missile family for terminal guidance against moving maritime targets.

== See also ==
- Anti-ship missile
- Cruise missile
- Surface-to-surface missile
- Anti-ballistic missile
- Anti-ballistic missile treaty
- Atmospheric reentry
- Prompt Global Strike
