= YJ-21 =

- Type: Hypersonic anti-ship ballistic missile
- Place of origin: China

Service history
- In service: 2022–present
- Used by: People's Liberation Army Navy

Production history
- Manufacturer: CALT?/SAST?

Specifications
- Length: approx. 8.3 metres (27 ft)
- Warhead: Conventional
- Operational range: approx. 1,500 kilometres (930 mi) (claimed)
- Maximum speed: Mach 6 – Mach 10 (7,400–12,300 km/h) (claimed)
- Launch platform: Sea platform: Type 055 destroyer; Aerial platform: Xian H-6K

The YJ-21 (Chinese: 鹰击-21; pinyin: Yīngjī-èryāo; lit. 'eagle strike 21') is a Chinese anti-ship ballistic missile.

== History and development ==
An export version called YJ-21E was showcased in Airshow China 2022, depicted underslung from the H-6K bomber.

The air-launched YJ-21, also called KD-21, was showcased by Chinese state media in 2024. The export version, YJ-21E, was displayed at the Zhuhai Airshow again in November 2024. In July 2024, a photograph showed the H-6K bomber taking off while carrying four KD-21 missiles. In the same year, the KD-21 was also depicted as part of the armaments for China's CH-Series unmanned aerial vehicles.

In April 2025, the Chinese Air Force (PLAAF) official media account displayed H-6 bombers fitted with YJ-21 (KD-21) missiles. This report confirmed for the first time that KD-21 is operational with the PLAAF.

In 2022, an unidentified hypersonic missile was revealed by the Chinese Navy ahead of its 73rd anniversary, launching from a universal vertical launch system of the Type 055 destroyer. The Chinese Navy did not reveal the missile's designation, but defense analysts believed it to be the ship-launched version of the YJ-21. However, with the emergence of the YJ-20 hypersonic missile in 2025, having a more closely aligned profile to the missile launched by Type 055 in 2022, analysts believed these were two separate missile developments.

In December 2025, Chengdu J-10C was photographed carrying YJ-21 (YJ-21E).

== Design ==
According to a 2023 People's Liberation Army Strategic Support Force article, the missile has a cruise speed of Mach 6, and a terminal speed of Mach 10. The missile could be launched from China's Type 055 destroyer or the H-6 bomber.

== Variants ==
YJ-21
Original designation
YJ-21E
Export variant
KD-21
Air-launched ballistic missile. First shown at Airshow China 2022. Four missiles can be carried at once by a H-6K bomber. This missile is derived from YJ-21 or CM-401 anti-ship ballistic missile. The missile is speculated to serve both land attack and anti-ship roles, and serve alongside the larger KF-21 (NATO designation: CH-AS-X-13) aero-ballistic missile.

== Operators ==
- China
  - People's Liberation Army Navy
  - People's Liberation Army Air Force

== See also ==
- CH-AS-X-13 – (China)
- AGM-183 ARRW – (United States)
- Kh-47M2 Kinzhal – (Russia)
