= H/PJ-45 130mm naval gun =

Chinese single-barrel naval gun

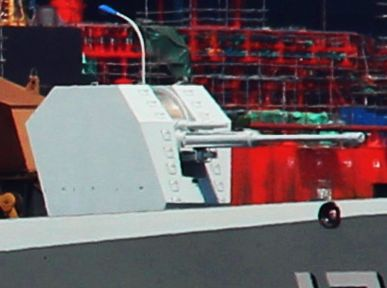
H/PJ-45 130mm naval gun installed on a Type 052D destroyer

The H/PJ-45 is a single-barreled 130mm naval gun employed by the People's Liberation Army Navy. This naval gun, which was designed in 2005, was first installed on the Type 052D destroyer and later on the Type 055 destroyer. When name of the gun is also given as the H/PJ-38 in some English and Japanese literature. This weapon's official designation, according to Taiwanese military journalist Lu Yi, is H/PJ-45.

== Design ==
The H/PJ-45 was designed by the Norinco, through experience gained from the reverse engineering of the Soviet twin-barrel AK-130 130mm naval gun. The H/PJ-45 was manufactured by the Inner Mongolia Second Machinery Manufacturing Factory.

Chen Dingfeng was the general designer of the H/PJ-45. Dingfeng was also the general designer for the Type 79 100 mm naval gun, the Type 210 100 mm naval gun, and the H/PJ-26 76 mm naval gun. The Chinese navy was unsatisfied and did not let the AK-130 counterpart go into production, despite all performance parameters being met. The Chinese Navy determined the AK-130 to be out-of-date, which led to the creation of the H/PJ-45 program in 2005.

== See also ==
=== Weapons of comparable role, performance and era ===
- 4.5 inch Mark 8 naval gun
- 5"/54 caliber Mark 45 gun
- French 100 mm naval gun
- Otobreda 127/54 Compact
- Otobreda 127/64
- AK-130
