= Type 055 destroyer =

Chinese guided-missile stealth cruiser/destroyer class

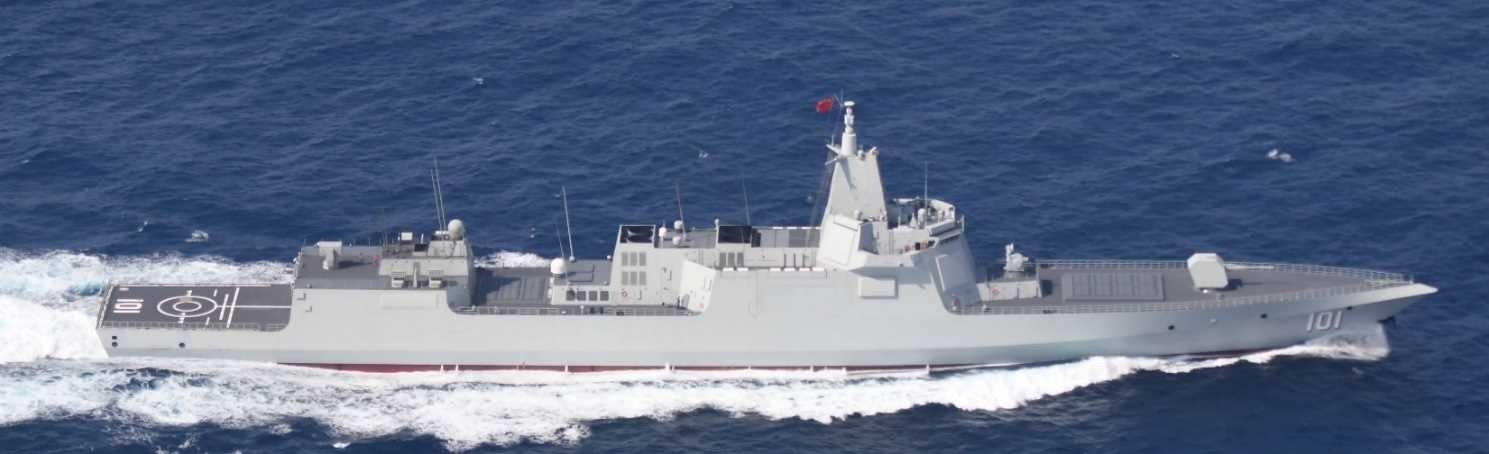
- Nanchang in April 2021

Class overview
- Builders: Changxingdao-Jiangnan Shipyard, Shanghai; Dalian Shipyard, Liaoning
- Operators: People's Liberation Army Navy
- Preceded by: Type 052D destroyer
- Cost: CN¥6 billion (US$888 million) per unit including R&D (FY 2017)
- Built: 2014–present
- In service: 2020–present
- Planned: 16
- Building: 4
- Active: 10

General characteristics
- Type: Large guided-missile destroyer Guided-missile cruiser (per NATO)
- Displacement: 11,000 t (11,000 long tons) (standard); 12–13,000 t (12–12,795 long tons) (full load)
- Length: 180 m (590 ft 7 in)
- Beam: 20 m (65 ft 7 in)
- Draught: 6.6 m (21 ft 8 in)
- Installed power: 6 × QD-50 turbine generators (5 MW (6,700 hp) each); Total: 30 MW (40,000 shp)
- Propulsion: COGAG; 4 × QC-280 gas turbines (28 MW (38,000 hp) each); Total: 112 MW (150,000 shp)
- Speed: 30 knots (56 km/h; 35 mph)
- Range: 5,000 nmi (9,300 km) at 12 kn (22 km/h; 14 mph)
- Complement: 300+
- Sensors & processing systems: Type 346B Dragon Eye (C/S-band) multifunctional radar; X-band multifunctional radar; Navigational radar; Optronic system; Optronic gunfire control system; Hull-mounted sonar; Variable-depth / towed-array sonars
- Electronic warfare & decoys: Electronic warfare system; 24-barreled decoy launchers; Type 726-4 decoy launchers
- Armament: 1 × 130 mm H/PJ-45 130mm naval gun; 1 × 30 mm Type 1130 Golden Shield (H/PJ-11) gun-based CIWS; 1 × 24-cell HHQ-10 SAM-based CIWS; 112 GJB 5860-2006 universal VLS cells for: HQ-9 family long range surface-to-air missiles: HHQ-9; HHQ-9B; HQ-16 family medium range surface-to-air missiles: HHQ-16; HHQ-16B; YJ-18A anti-ship missiles; YJ-20 anti-ship ballistic missiles; YJ-21 anti-ship ballistic missiles; CJ-10 land-attack cruise missile; Anti-submarine missiles; 2 × sets of 324 mm (12.8 in) torpedo tubes; Yu-7 torpedoes
- Aircraft carried: 2 medium-lift helicopters; Harbin Z-9; Changhe Z-18; Harbin Z-20
- Aviation facilities: Stern hangar; Helicopter landing platform

The Type 055 destroyer (NATO/OSD designation Renhai-class cruiser) is a class of large stealthy guided-missile destroyers (rated as guided-missile cruisers per NATO/OSD standard parlance) constructed for the Chinese People's Liberation Army Navy (PLAN). It has a multi-mission design; the combination of sensors and weapons provides a main role of area air defence, with anti-submarine warfare capabilities surpassing previous Chinese surface combatants.

The Type 055 undertakes blue-water expeditionary missions and forms the primary escort for Chinese aircraft carriers. The United States classifies these ships as cruisers as the United States Navy (USN) defines a cruiser as a large multi-mission surface combatant with flag facilities; this suggests the U.S. expects the Type 055 to fulfill a similar role to the USN's Ticonderoga-class cruiser.

== Development ==
The People's Liberation Army Navy (PLAN) was interested in a large destroyer from as early as the late-1960s. A development program, code-named "055", initiated in 1976 was cancelled in 1983 after encountering insurmountable technical obstacles from industrial underdevelopment; for example, the required gas turbine power plants could neither be produced domestically nor imported at acceptable prices.

In April 2014, an image emerged of a full-scale mock-up of the Type 055 superstructure—with enclosed integrated mast for radar and other electronics—at the Chinese naval electronic testing range in Wuhan.

Nanchang, the first ship of the class, began construction in 2014 at the Jiangnan Shipyard in Shanghai, and was commissioned on 12 January 2020. Its first public appearance—preceding commissioning—was during the PLAN's 70th-anniversary parade on 23 April 2019. When launched, Nanchang was the largest post-Second World War warship launched in East Asia.

The first batch of eight vessels to this design was laid down from 2014 to 2018, and all were in service by the end of 2022. Further hulls under construction, observed by satellite imagery, including two at Dalian in January 2022, and two at Jiangnan, as part of a second batch of eight vessels (to reach a total of 16) under procurement provided for in the 14th Five Year Programme (2021–2025), aimed to equip all three Fleets.

Satellite imagery in 2024 revealed that the ninth and tenth vessels of the class had been launched at Dalian and Jiangnan respectively, with the 11th and 12th units nearing launch at these two yards.

== Design ==
=== Stealth ===
The Type 055 adopts a conventional flared hull with distinctive stealthy features including an enclosed forecastle that hides mooring points, anchor chains, and other equipment. The bow and main deckhouse are configured similarly to previous Type 052C/D destroyers. A continuous structure located amidships increases internal volume and reduces radar cross-section. The smokestack design reduces both infrared signature and radar cross-section. Chinese sources credit the design as being generally stealthy, with reduced radar, noise, infrared and electromagnetic radiation signatures.

=== Powerplants ===
Propulsion is generated by four 28 MW (38,000 hp) QC-280 gas turbines in combined gas and gas (COGAG) arrangement. Additional power may be provided by six 5 MW (6,700 hp) QD-50 gas turbines.

The maximum flank speed is estimated to be 30 knots (56 km/h; 35 mph).

=== Electronics ===
Chinese literature suggests that the Type 055 is capable of "facilitat[ing] command management of a battlegroup and supporting elements". The command-and-control and battle management systems are likely comparable to contemporary PLAN systems, which reflect over a decade of intensive interest in information integration from the late 2000s.

Multiple sensors are housed inside the integrated mast and ship superstructure. The class has a dual-band radar system; four S-band Type 346B Dragon Eye active electronically scanned array (AESA) panels are mounted on the superstructure, and four smaller X-band panels are mounted on the mast. The Type 346B panels are estimated to be 40% larger than the Type 052D destroyer's Type 346A panels, for greater transmission power and sensitivity. Chinese sources claim the radar can be used to guide anti-satellite missiles.

The ship structure also contains navigation radars, various communication and intelligence systems, electronic warfare support measures (ESM), electronic countermeasures (ECM), electro-optical (EO) sensors, laser-warning systems, optronic jammers, and datalink systems. They are likely more advanced than those deployed on previous ships.

A deployment port exists for variable depth and towed array sonar, with a large bulbous bow likely contains a bow sonar.

=== Armament ===
The primary armament is missiles carried in 112 vertical launching system (VLS) cells, 64 cells forward and 48 cells aft. The same VLS model is used on the Type 052D destroyer, which is believed to be an implementation of the GJB 5860-2006 standard; the GJB 5860-2006 is capable of hot and cold launches using concentric canisters. The Type 055 is expected to carry HHQ-9 surface-to-air missiles, YJ-18 anti-ship cruise missiles, CJ-10 land-attack cruise missiles, and missile-launched anti-submarine torpedoes upon entering service. Potentially, the larger cells may also carry anti-ship ballistic missiles. In December 2025, Chinese state media reported the test launch of the YJ-20 anti-ship ballistic missiles from the Type 055.

Additional armament includes a 130 mm main gun, an 11-barrel 30 mm close-in weapon system (CIWS), a HHQ-10 short-range air defense system, 324 mm torpedo launchers, and decoy launchers. There is hangar space for two helicopters.

== Future developments ==
It has been suggested that future variants may be armed with lasers or electromagnetic railguns, though since the current design does not have integrated electric propulsion, installation of integrated electric propulsion will be required for the ship to meet the estimated power requirements for such weapons in the future.

In 2021, the United States Department of Defense identified the Type 055 as the future launch platform for China's naval-based mid-course interceptors, such as the HQ-19 anti-ballistic missiles.

== Operational history ==
In April 2021, Nanchang operated with the aircraft carrier Liaoning's escort group, and became the first Type 055 to be part of a carrier escort group.

== Ships of class ==
Pennant number	Name	Namesake	Builder	Laid down	Launched	Commissioned	Fleet	Status
101	南昌／Nanchang	City of Nanchang, provincial capital of Jiangxi	Jiangnan Shipyard, Changxingdao, Shanghai	2014	28 June 2017	12 January 2020	North Sea Fleet	Active
102	拉萨／Lhasa	City of Lhasa, capital of Tibet	Jiangnan Shipyard, Changxingdao	2015	28 April 2018	2 March 2021	North Sea Fleet	Active
105	大连／Dalian	City of Dalian, in Liaoning	Dalian Shipyard, Liaoning	2016	3 July 2018	23 April 2021	South Sea Fleet	Active
103	鞍山／Anshan	City of Anshan, in Liaoning	Jiangnan Shipyard, Changxingdao	2017	12 September 2019	11 November 2021	North Sea Fleet	Active
106	延安 / Yan'an	City of Yan'an, in Shaanxi	Dalian Shipyard, Liaoning	2016	3 July 2018	February 2022	South Sea Fleet	Active
104	无锡／Wuxi	City of Wuxi, in Jiangsu	Jiangnan Shipyard, Changxingdao	2018	9 May 2020	March 2022	North Sea Fleet	Active
107	遵义 / Zunyi	City of Zunyi, in Guizhou	Dalian Shipyard, Liaoning	2017	26 December 2019	November 2022	South Sea Fleet	Active
108	咸阳 / Xianyang	City of Xianyang, in Shaanxi	Dalian Shipyard, Liaoning	2018	30 August 2020	December 2022	South Sea Fleet	Active
109	东莞 / Dongguan	City of Dongguan, in Guangdong	Jiangnan Shipyard, Changxingdao	2022	28 December 2023	March 2026	East Sea Fleet	Active
110	安庆 / Anqing	City of Anqing, in Anhui	Dagushan Shipyard, Dalian, Liaoning	2022	26 March 2024	March 2026	East Sea Fleet	Active

== See also ==
- List of active People's Liberation Army Navy ships
- List of destroyer classes in service

Equivalent destroyers of the same era

- Zumwalt class
- Maya class
- Arleigh Burke class
- Sejong the Great class
