= Chinese destroyer Nanchang (101) =

Type 055 destroyer of the PLA Navy

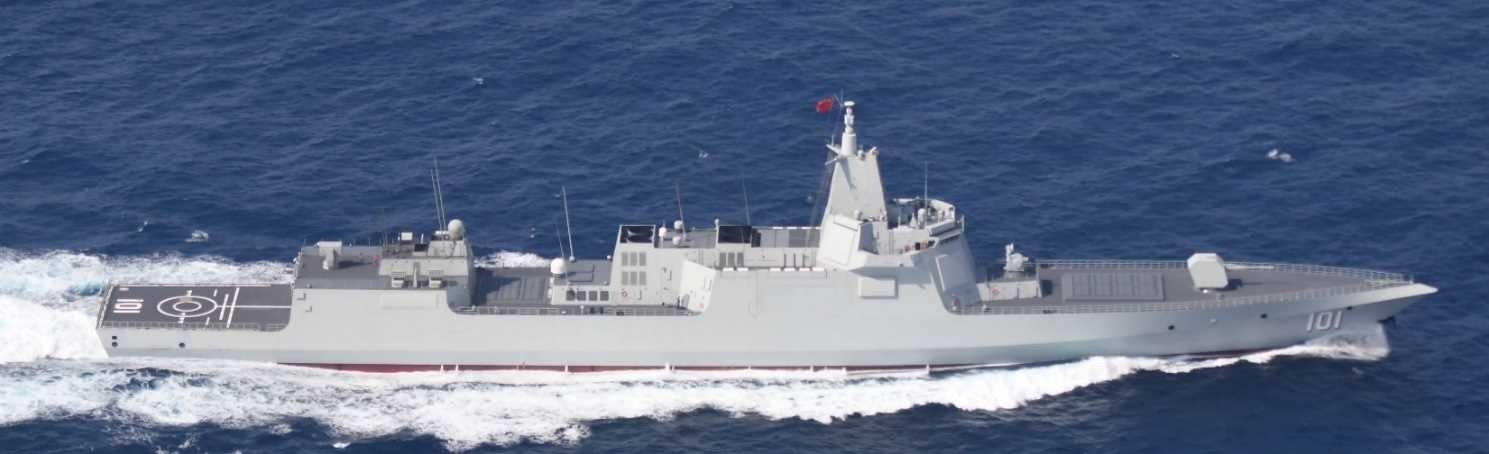
- Nanchang underway on 26 March 2021

History

China
- Name: Nanchang
- Namesake: Nanchang; (南昌)
- Builder: Jiangnan Shipyard, Shanghai
- Laid down: December 2014
- Launched: 28 June 2017
- Commissioned: 12 January 2020
- Identification: Pennant number: 101
- Status: Active

General characteristics
- Class & type: Type 055 destroyer
- Displacement: 12-13,000 tonnes (full load)
- Length: 180 m (590 ft 7 in)
- Beam: 20 m (65 ft 7 in)
- Draught: 6.6 m (21 ft 8 in)
- Installed power: 6 × QD-50 turbine generators (5 MW (6,700 hp) each); Total: 30 MW (40,000 shp)
- Propulsion: COGAG; 4 × QC-280 gas turbines (28 MW (38,000 hp) each); Total: 112 MW (150,000 shp)
- Speed: 30 knots (56 km/h; 35 mph)
- Range: 5,000 nmi (9,300 km)
- Complement: 300+
- Sensors & processing systems: Type 346B (C/S-band) radar; X-band radar
- Electronic warfare & decoys: Electronic warfare system
- Armament: 1 × H/PJ-38 130 mm gun; 1 × H/PJ-11 CIWS; 1 × HQ-10 short-range SAM 24-cell launcher; 112 VLS; HHQ-9 surface-to-air missiles; YJ-18 anti-ship cruise missiles; CJ-10 land-attack cruise missiles; Missile-launched anti-submarine torpedoes YJ-21 anti-ship ballistic missiles; 2 x sets; Yu-7 torpedoes
- Aircraft carried: 2 medium-lift helicopters; Harbin Z-9; Changhe Z-18
- Aviation facilities: Stern hangar; Helicopter landing platform

Nanchang (101) is a Type 055 destroyer of the People's Liberation Army Navy. She was commissioned on 12 January 2020.

== Development and design ==
The People's Liberation Army Navy was interested in a large destroyer from as early as the late-1960s. A development program, code-named "055", initiated in 1976 was cancelled in 1983 after encountering insurmountable technical obstacles from industrial underdevelopment; for example, the required gas turbine power plants could neither be produced domestically, nor imported at acceptable prices. In April 2014, an image emerged of a full-scale mock-up of the Type 055 superstructure - with enclosed integrated mast for radar and other electronics at the Chinese naval electronic testing range in Wuhan.

The Type 055 is expected to undertake expeditionary missions and form the primary escort for Chinese aircraft carriers. The United States classifies these ships as cruisers. The United States Navy defines a cruiser as a large multi-mission surface combatant with flagship capabilities; this suggests the U.S. expects the Type 055 to fulfill a similar role as the Ticonderoga-class cruiser.

== Construction and career ==
Nanchang is the lead ship of the class and laid down in December 2014 at the Jiangnan Shipyard in Shanghai. She made her first public appearance preceding commissioning during the PLAN's 70th anniversary parade on 23 April 2019. When launched, Nanchang was among the largest post-Second World War warships launched in East Asia. She was commissioned on 12 January 2020.

On 5 April 2021, Nanchang was the first Type 055 to be a part of an aircraft carrier group, which included the aircraft carrier Liaoning, destroyers Chengdu and Taiyuan, frigate Huanggang, and fast combat support ship Hulunhu. This group was spotted between Okinawa and Miyako Island.

On 22 May 2022, Nanchang conducted drills in the East China Sea as a part of the Liaoning Carrier Group; and they were sighted near Miyako Island by the JMSDF.

== Gallery ==
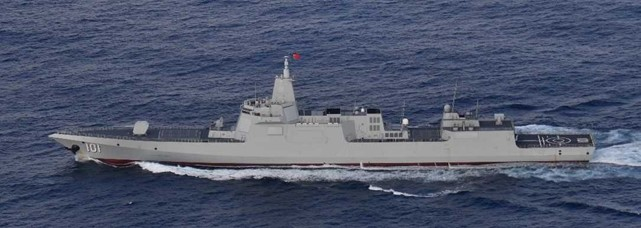

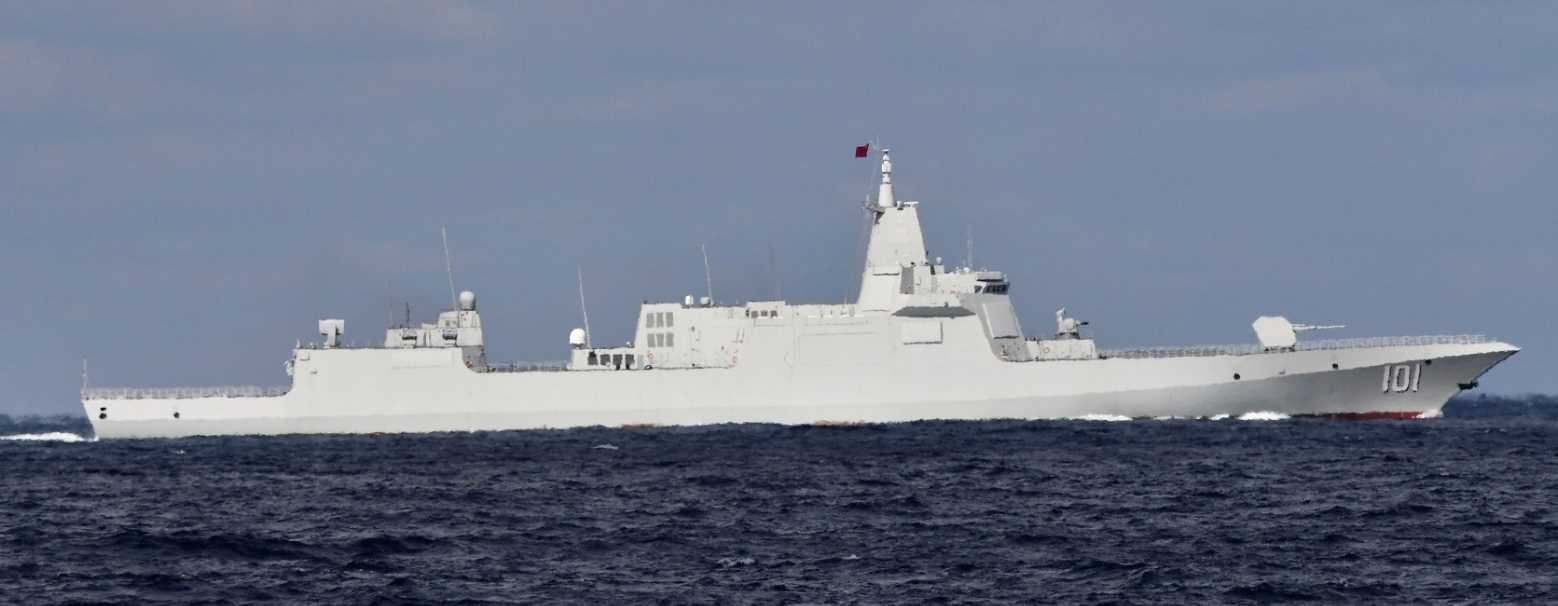

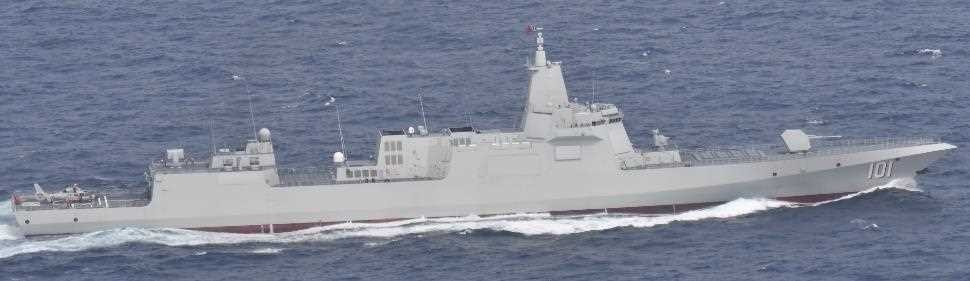
