= Chinese aircraft carrier Liaoning =

Liaoning (16)
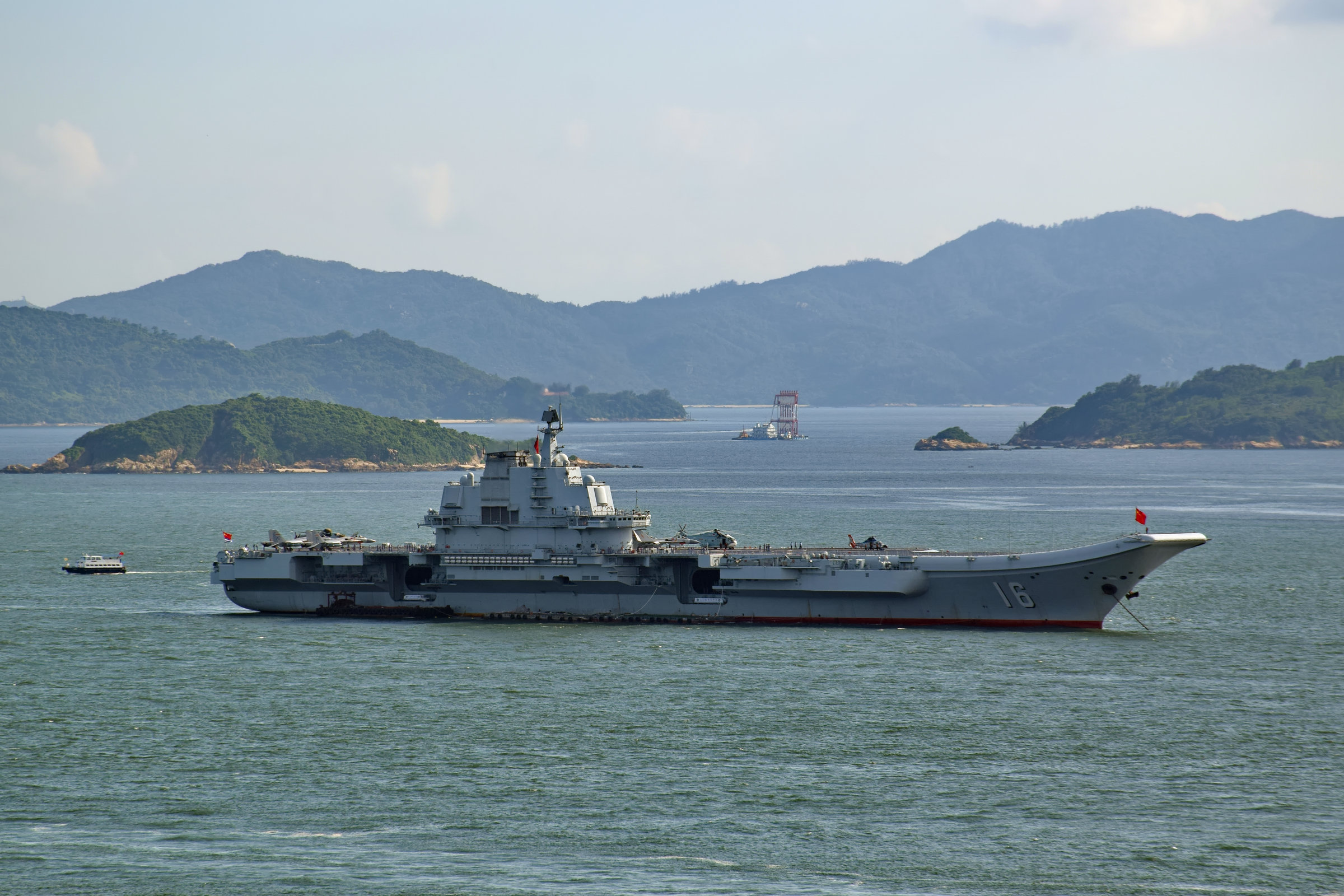
- The aircraft carrier Liaoning in Hong Kong in 2017

Class overview
- Builders: Dalian Shipbuilding Industry
- Operators: People's Liberation Army Navy
- Preceded by: Kiev class
- Succeeded by: Type 002 Shandong
- Completed: 1

History

→ Soviet Union → Ukraine
- Name: Riga (1988) then Varyag (1990)
- Namesake: City of Riga, Latvia (1988) then Varyag, named for the Varangians (1990), the name Varyag was then adopted by another cruiser.
- Ordered: 1983
- Builder: Mykolaiv South; Nevskoye Planning and Design Bureau
- Laid down: 6 December 1985
- Launched: 4 December 1988
- Completed: Abandoned (68% complete)
- Fate: Sold to a Chinese buyer, 1998; Transferred to the Chinese navy, 2002

China
- Name: Liaoning; (Chinese: 辽宁舰)
- Namesake: Liaoning Province
- Builder: Dalian Shipbuilding Industry
- Cost: US$ 120 Million (Former Ukraine)
- Completed: 2011
- Commissioned: 25 September 2012
- Motto: (Simplified Chinese:保卫祖国，勇争第一)：Defend the motherland, strive to be the first.
- Status: In active service
- Badge: See § Ship Emblem

General characteristics for Varyag as originally designed
- Class & type: Type 001, Kuznetsov-class aircraft carrier
- Type: STOBAR aircraft carrier
- Displacement: 43,000 tons, light; 54,500 tons, normal; 60,900 tons, full load
- Length: 306.4 m (1,005 ft 3 in) o/a; 270 m (885 ft 10 in) w/l
- Beam: 74.4 m (244 ft 1 in) o/a; 35 m (114 ft 10 in) w/l
- Installed power: Steam
- Propulsion: Steam TV12 turbines, 8 KVG-4 boilers, 4 shafts, 200,000 hp (150 MW); 4 × 50,000 hp (37 MW) turbines; 9 × 2,011 hp (1,500 kW) turbogenerators; 6 × 2,011 hp (1,500 kW) diesel generators; 4 × fixed pitch propellers
- Speed: 32 knots (59 km/h; 37 mph)
- Range: 3,850 nmi (7,130 km; 4,430 mi) at 32 knots
- Endurance: 45 days
- Complement: 1,960 crew; 626 air group; 40 flag staff
- Sensors & processing systems: Type 346 radar S-band AESA; Type 382 Radar 3-D search
- ship/characteristics| aircraft = * 40+ fixed-wing and rotary-wing aircraft including: ** 36 Shenyang J-15[7]              ** 4 Changhe Z-18[8] ** 2 Harbin Z-9

Liaoning (16; Chinese: 辽宁舰; pinyin: Liáoníng Jiàn) is the first and only ship of the Chinese Type 001 class aircraft carrier. The first aircraft carrier commissioned into the People's Liberation Army Navy Surface Force, she was originally classified as a training ship, intended to allow the Navy to experiment, train and gain familiarity with aircraft carrier operations. Following upgrades and additional training in late 2018, Chinese state media announced that the ship would shift to a combat role in 2019.

Originally laid down in 1984 for the Soviet Navy as the Kuznetsov-class aircraft carrier Riga, she was launched on 4 December 1988 and renamed Varyag in 1990. After the dissolution of the Soviet Union in 1991, construction was halted and the ship was put up for sale by Ukraine. The stripped hulk was purchased in 1998 and after much delay, towed to the Dalian naval shipyard in northeast China, arriving in 2002.

The ship was rebuilt and commissioned into the People's Liberation Army Navy (PLAN) as Liaoning on 25 September 2012. Its Chinese ship class designation is Type 001. In November 2016, the political commissar of Liaoning, Commodore Li Dongyou, stated that Liaoning was combat-ready.

== Classification ==
The Kuznetsov-class ships were originally designated by the Soviet Navy as "тяжёлый авианесущий крейсер" (tyazholiy avianesushchiy kreyser, TAKR or TAVKR), meaning "heavy aircraft-carrying cruiser". In addition to aircraft, the ships were designed to carry P-700 Granit anti-ship cruise missiles that also form the main armament of the Kirov-class battlecruisers. This multirole capability allowed the ships to avoid classification as aircraft carriers, thus allowing them to pass through the Turkish Straits between the Black Sea and the Mediterranean Sea. Under the Montreux Convention, aircraft carriers larger than 15,000 tons are not permitted to pass through the Straits, but there is no displacement limit on other types of capital ships from Black Sea powers.

In contrast, the People's Liberation Army Navy considers Liaoning to be an aircraft carrier. Since China is not located on the Black Sea and thus not considered a Black Sea power under the Montreux Convention, it does not need and cannot use the tonnage exemption for non-aircraft carrier capital ships. The ship was completed as an aircraft carrier, and cruise missiles were never installed. Liaoning is equipped only with air defense weapons and must use its aircraft for a surface attack.

== History ==
=== Origin ===
The ship was laid down as Riga at Shipyard 444 (now Mykolaiv South) in Mykolaiv, Ukrainian SSR, on 6 December 1985. Design work was undertaken by the Nevskoye Planning and Design Bureau. Launched on 4 December 1988, the carrier was renamed Varyag in late 1990, after a previous similarly named cruiser launched in 1899. When the Soviet Union collapsed in 1991, the ship was only 68% complete. Construction was halted, and the ship was put up for sale. The name Varyag was then adopted by another cruiser launched in 1983.

=== Sale ===
Ukraine approached China, India, and Russia as potential buyers. China sent a high-level delegation in 1992, which reported that the ship was in good condition and recommended a purchase. However, the Chinese government declined to purchase the ship because of the international diplomatic situation at the time. Unable to find a buyer, Ukraine left the ship to deteriorate in the elements.

In 1998, the ship was sold at auction for $20 million to Agencia Turistica E Diversões Chong Lot Limitada, a company from Macau. Chong Lot proposed to tow Varyag to Macau under pretenses of conversion into a $200 million floating hotel and casino; Western observers were suspicious of the deal since Chong Lot had no listed telephone number, was not located at its listed address, and was run by former officers in the Chinese Navy. Officials in Macau also denied Chong Lot's application to operate a casino. However, analysts noted that Varyag had deteriorated too much to be used as an operational warship and pointed out that the Chinese Navy was concentrating on submarines. The Soviet carriers Kiev and Minsk had also been sold to China as tourist attractions.

In January 2015, further details emerged in an interview with Hong Kong-based businessman Xu Zengping by the South China Morning Post. Xu, a former military basketball player, reported that he had been commissioned by the PLAN to purchase the vessel on its behalf, with the floating hotel and casino as a cover story. He was warned that the Chinese Navy did not have the budget to buy the ship, and the Chinese government did not support the purchase. However, Xu was so impressed when touring the ship that he resolved to purchase it using his personal funds. The previous year, Xu had borrowed HK$230 million from a Hong Kong business friend, spending HK$6 million to create Chong Lot as a Macau shell corporation. He described a harrowing negotiation in Kyiv, lubricated by bribery and liquor, which helped to arrange victory at the auction. As a precaution, he shipped 40 tonnes of the carrier's blueprints to China overland in eight trucks.

=== Transfer to China ===
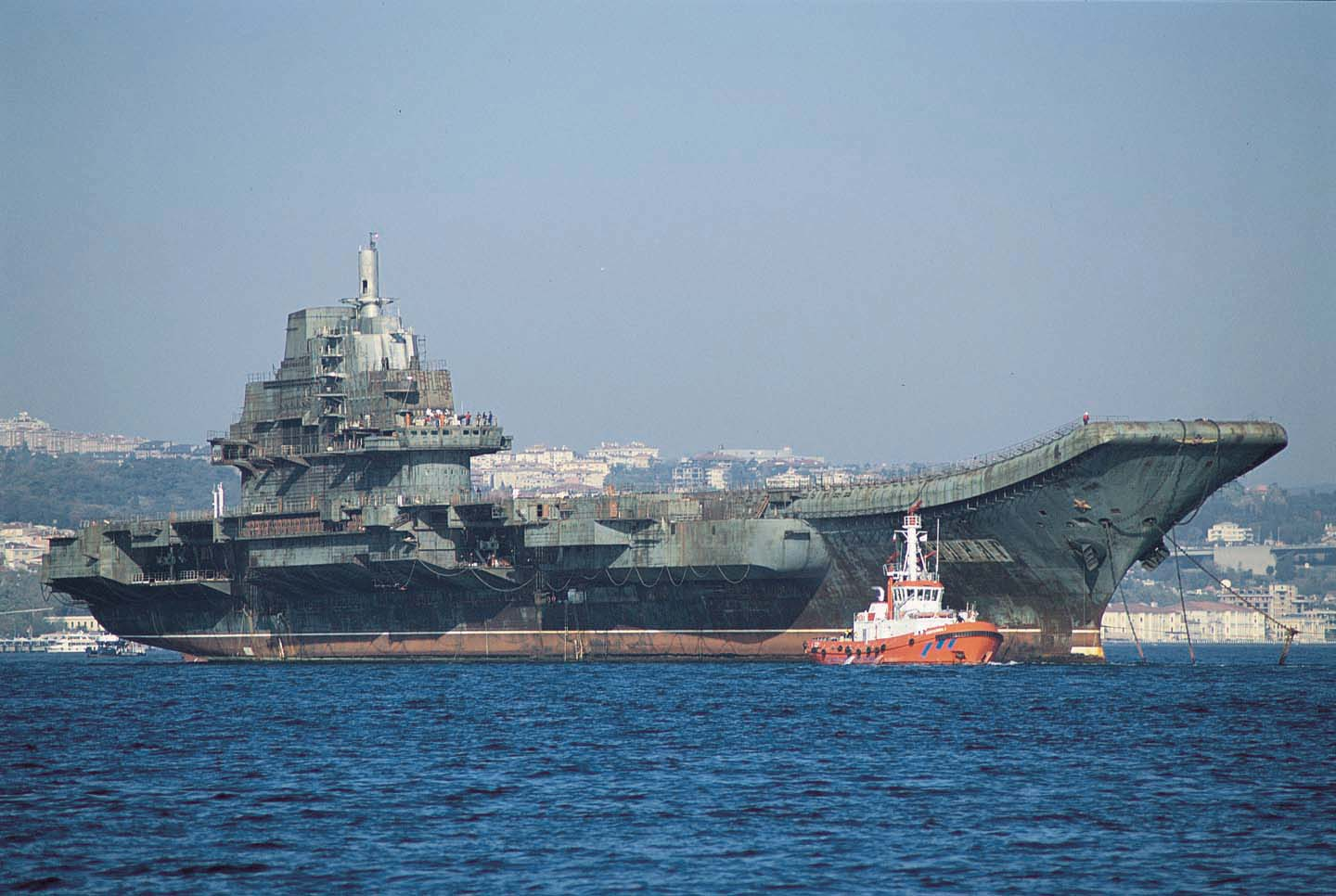
Ex-Varyag under tow in Istanbul in 2001

The passage from Ukraine to China was even more troublesome than the purchase. In June 2000, Varyag was taken under tow. As the tugboat approached the Bosphorus, Turkey denied permission for the ship to pass through, citing the risk that a gust of wind would turn the ship widthwise and block the entire strait. Varyag spent the next 16 months being towed around the Black Sea, accruing towing charges of $8,500 a day as Chong Lot stopped paying its bills. The tugboat operator compared its fate to the Yellow Fleet that was stuck in the Suez Canal for eight years, and French thrillseekers even landed a helicopter on the ship. Meanwhile, Chinese officials negotiated with Turkey, offering trade and tourism concessions.

In August 2001, Turkey relented and agreed to allow the ship to pass. On 1 November 2001, the Bosphorus was cleared of all other traffic as Varyag was towed through. On 2 November, Varyag also passed through the Dardanelles without incident. On 4 November, Varyag was caught in a force 10 gale and broke adrift while passing the Greek island of Skyros. The ship was taken back under tow on 6 November, after one sailor died while attempting to attach the tow lines.

The Suez Canal does not permit passage of "dead" ships – those without an on-board power source – so the hulk was towed through the Strait of Gibraltar, around Pointe des Almadies and the Cape of Good Hope, past Cape Agulhas and into the Indian Ocean and through the Straits of Malacca at an average speed of 6 knots (11 km/h; 6.9 mph) across the 15,200-nautical-mile (28,200 km; 17,500 mi) journey. The tugboat fleet called for supplies en route at Piraeus, Greece; Las Palmas, Canary Islands; Maputo, Mozambique; and Singapore. Varyag entered Chinese waters on 20 February 2002, and arrived on 3 March at the Dalian naval shipyard in northeast China. The costs included $25 million to the Ukrainian government for the hull, nearly $500,000 in transit fees, and $5 million for 20 months of towing fees.

Xu Zengping estimated in 2015 that his total out-of-pocket cost was at least US$120 million. He insisted that he had never been reimbursed by the Chinese government, and had spent the last 18 years repaying his debts, in part by selling properties such as his home. A source familiar with the acquisition explained that the naval official, Ji Shengde, who initiated the mission, had been in prison because of smuggling.

Contrary to initial reports that the ship had no engines, Xu reported that all four original engines remained intact at the time of purchase, but had been shut down and preserved in grease seals. A refit restored them to working order in 2011.

=== Modernization and refurbishment ===
The 701st Institute was tasked to redesign Varyag; Zhu Yingfu (朱英富) and Wu Xiaoguang (吴晓光) were assigned as the general designer and deputy general designer, respectively. Wang Zhiguo (王治国) was assigned as the general system engineer, and Yang Lei (杨雷) was assigned as the general supervisor. The workload of converting Varyag for operational use was equivalent to building ten new destroyers. Varyag was moved in June 2005 to a dry dock at Dalian (38.935°N 121.6141°E). Her hull was sandblasted, scaffolding erected, and the ship's island was painted in a red marine primer to treat metal corrosion.

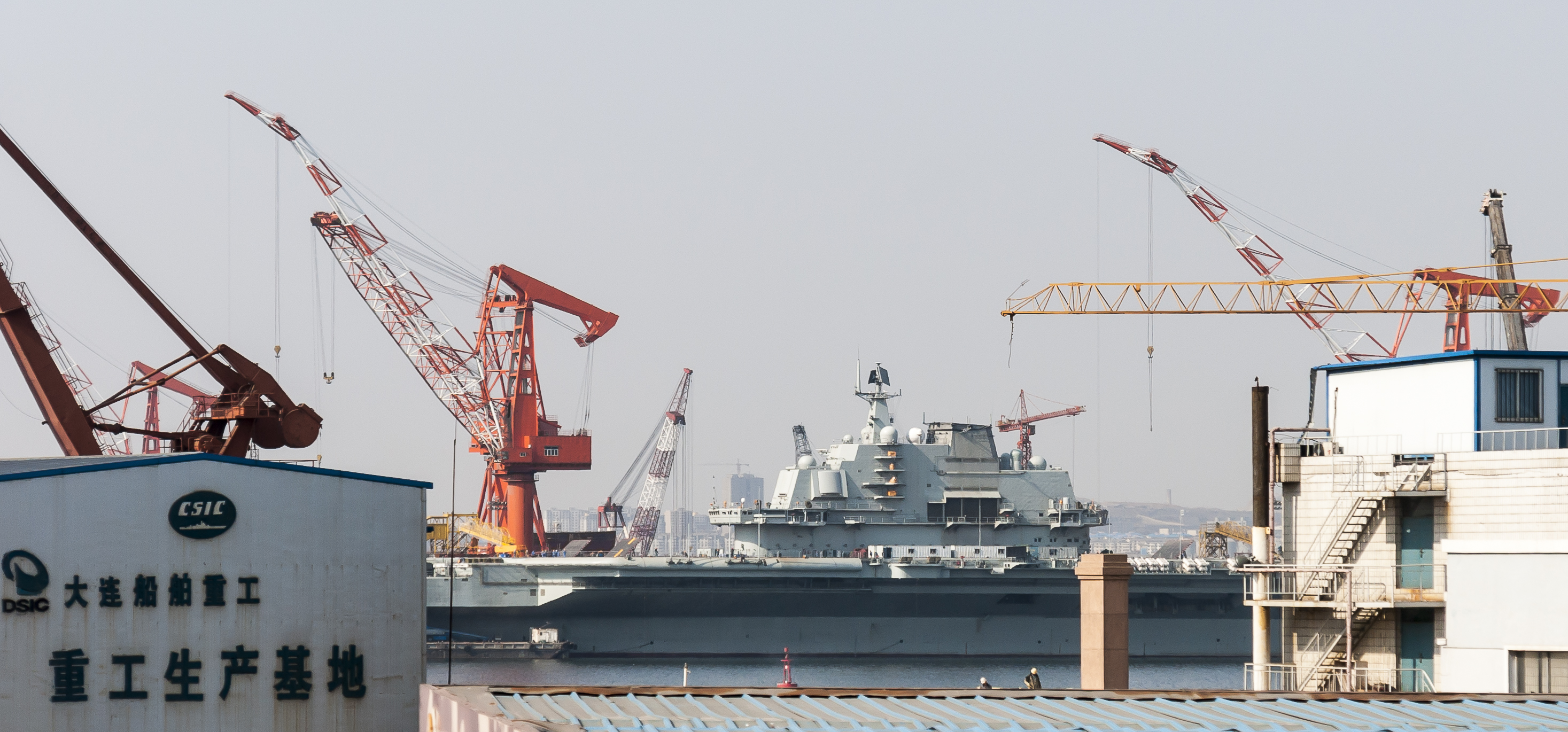
Liaoning at CSIC shipyard in Dalian, China (2012)

The ship is equipped with Type 346 S band active electronically scanned array (AESA) radar system as its primary air search radar. The air defence system consists of the Type 1130 CIWS and the HQ-10 missile system. The anti-ship missile tubes would not be used, freeing up internal space for hangar or storage use. Russia has explored similar modifications to her sister ship Admiral Kuznetsov.

In 2011 an analyst of DigitalGlobe (later: Maxar) spotted Liaoning as an aircraft carrier.

On 8 June 2011, General Chen Bingde made the first public acknowledgement of the ship's refit. On 27 July 2011, the Chinese Defence Ministry announced it was refitting the vessel for "scientific research, experiment and training".

In 2018, Asia Times reported that Sun Bo, a general manager of China Shipbuilding Industry Corporation, had allegedly passed on technical details of Liaoning to the Central Intelligence Agency. Sun was a general manager at the Dalian shipyard where the ship's refurbishment was done.

=== Sea trials ===
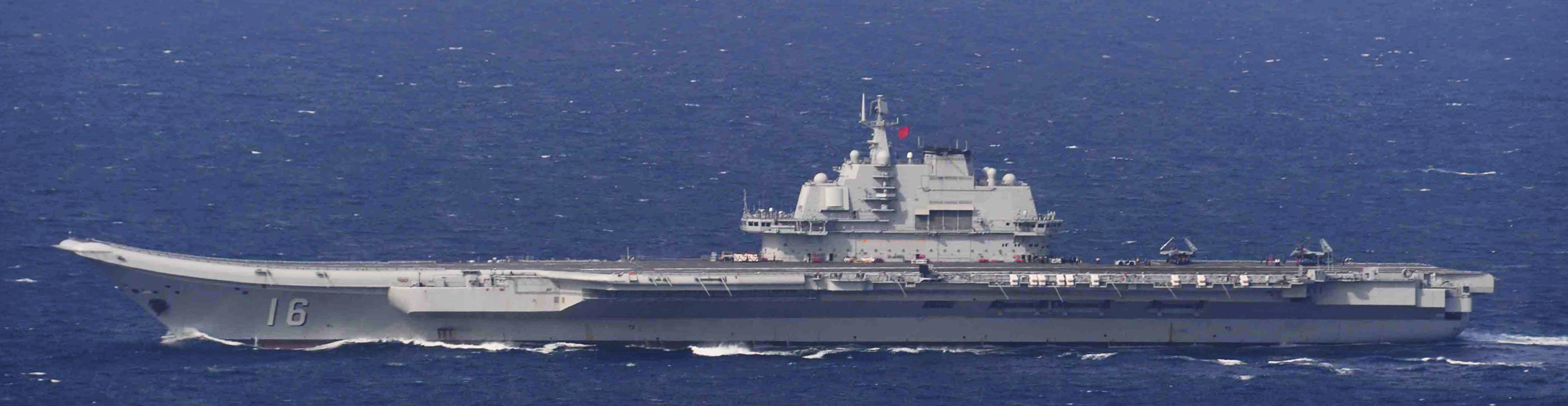
Liaoning in the East China Sea (2020)

The ship undertook her first sea trials from 10 August 2011 to 15 August 2011. On 29 November 2011 the carrier left port for her second set of trials. The carrier completed her eighth sea trial between 7 and 21 June 2012 and returned to Dalian. In July 2012, the ship set out for the longest trials thus far, 25 days. The carrier completed sea trials in early August 2012 and loaded Shenyang J-15 aircraft and KJ-88, YJ-83K and YJ-91 missiles in preparation for weapons systems trials.

During sea trials, Liaoning experienced a steam burst in the engine compartment which forced the crew to evacuate some parts of the ship, and the ship lost power. The problem was ultimately resolved and power was restored, although the time duration of the problem has not been released by military officials.

=== Handover to the Navy ===
On 23 September 2012, the aircraft carrier was handed over to the PLAN, and was commissioned on 25 September 2012. At the commissioning ceremony, the carrier was officially named Liaoning, in honour of the province in which she was retrofitted. On 26 December 2012, the People's Daily reported that it would take four to five years for Liaoning to reach full capacity. As it was a training ship until 2018, Liaoning was not assigned to any of China's operational fleets.

According to geopolitical analysts, China could use Liaoning and its future carriers to intimidate other countries that have territorial claims in the South China Sea, as well as extending air control further south of the disputed region. In December 2016 the ship exercised in the Western Pacific, including passing through the Miyako Strait between the Japanese islands of Miyako-jima and Okinawa. On 18 April 2018, Liaoning took part in the navy's live-fire exercises in the South China Sea, involving 76 fighter jets and 48 warships and submarines. The drills came after a large military display presided over by General Secretary of the Chinese Communist Party Xi Jinping, and were condemned by Taiwan as "military intimidation".

== Design ==
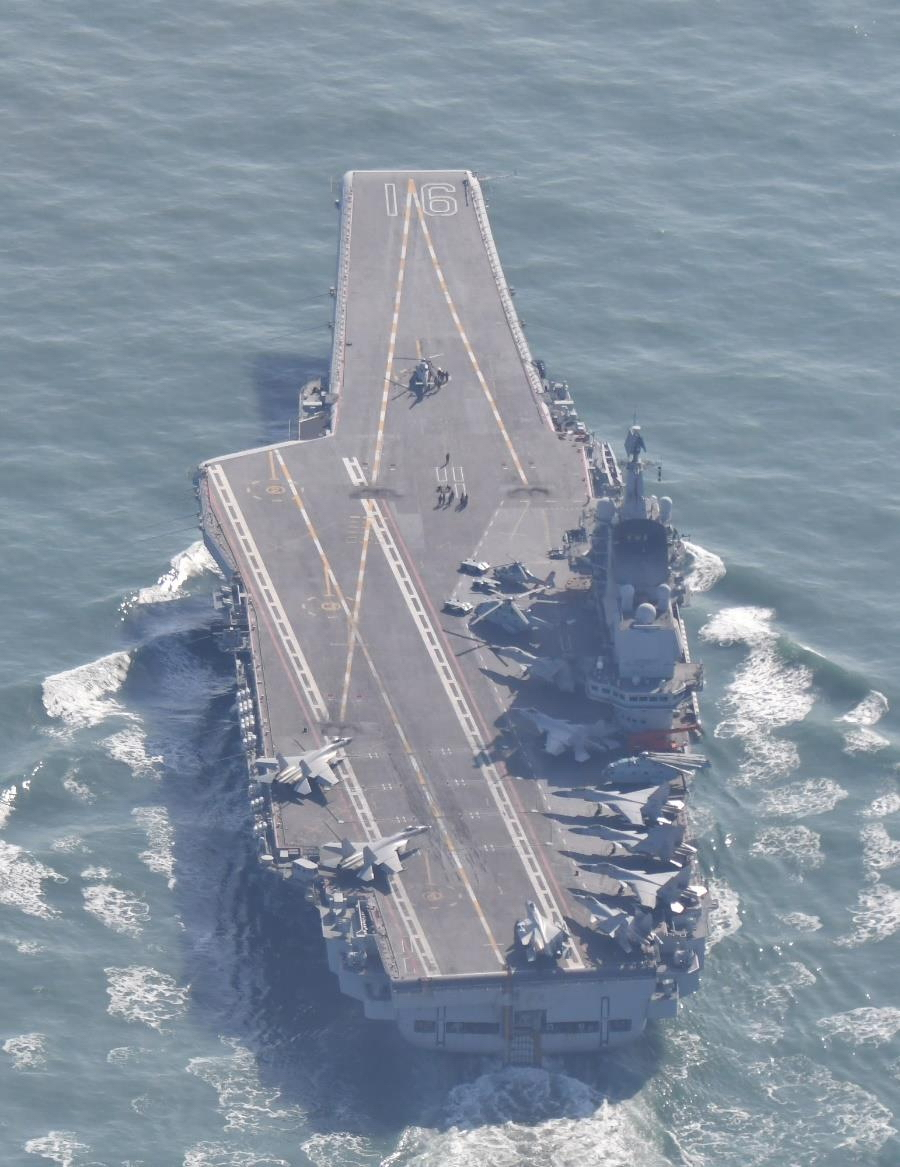
Aerial image from the stern of Liaoning in 2022

The Type 001 is built upon the unfinished hull of Kuznetsov-class aircraft carrier Varyag. Unlike Soviet Admiral Kuznetsov, the Chinese Type 001 ships are configured solely as aircraft carriers. The cruise missile launchers were never installed, and the incomplete launcher base was removed during the refit to converted a multi-purpose cabin. The air-defense system consists of FL-3000N surface-to-air-missiles and the Type 1130 CIWS.

In August 2014, the Chinese-language Shanghai Morning Post listed that Liaoning would carry 36 aircraft: 24 Shenyang J-15 fighters, six Changhe Z-18F anti-submarine warfare (ASW) helicopters, four Changhe Z-18J airborne early warning helicopters and two Harbin Z-9C rescue helicopters. The Chinese carrier aircraft inventory is similar to a balanced combat and support aircraft approach intended for Soviet aircraft carriers, which supported nuclear submarines, large surface combatants, and land-based strike bombers performing anti-access roles.

The Soviet lineage has its limitations. The air wing lacks long-range radar and anti-submarine fixed-wing aircraft, needing support from shore-based aircraft such as Tupolev Tu-154 ASW and Shaanxi Y-8 AWACS aircraft. The U.S. Department of Defense noted that J-15s will have below normal range and armament when operating from the carrier, due to limits imposed by the ski-jump takeoff system. The lack of a carrier onboard delivery aircraft like the United States Navy (USN) Grumman C-2 Greyhound also limits logistics capabilities. Liaoning would need extensive land-based support to oppose a USN carrier strike group; however, it would be potent against the Vietnam People's Navy and the Philippine Navy. Deficiencies will likely be corrected with future aircraft carriers, which are expected to be larger with conventional takeoff decks and catapult launching for heavier fighters, plus fixed-wing radar and anti-submarine patrol aircraft.

== Operational history ==
=== Home port ===
Liaoning is visible on satellite imagery regularly berthed at a large jetty at the Yuchi Naval Base (near Huangdao) in China's Shandong province since 2013; this is reported as its home port.

=== Maintenance ===
In August 2018, the South China Morning Post reported that Liaoning was berthed at Dalian undergoing its first refit since its commissioning in 2012. The radar above Liaoning's bridge and the air traffic control at the rear of the island superstructure were noted to have been removed, and scaffolding was also noted around the command center. The refit was completed in January 2019, spending about six months. The ship superstructure was modified with an improved design, and the flight deck was completely stripped and refurbished.

=== Training and aircraft handling ===
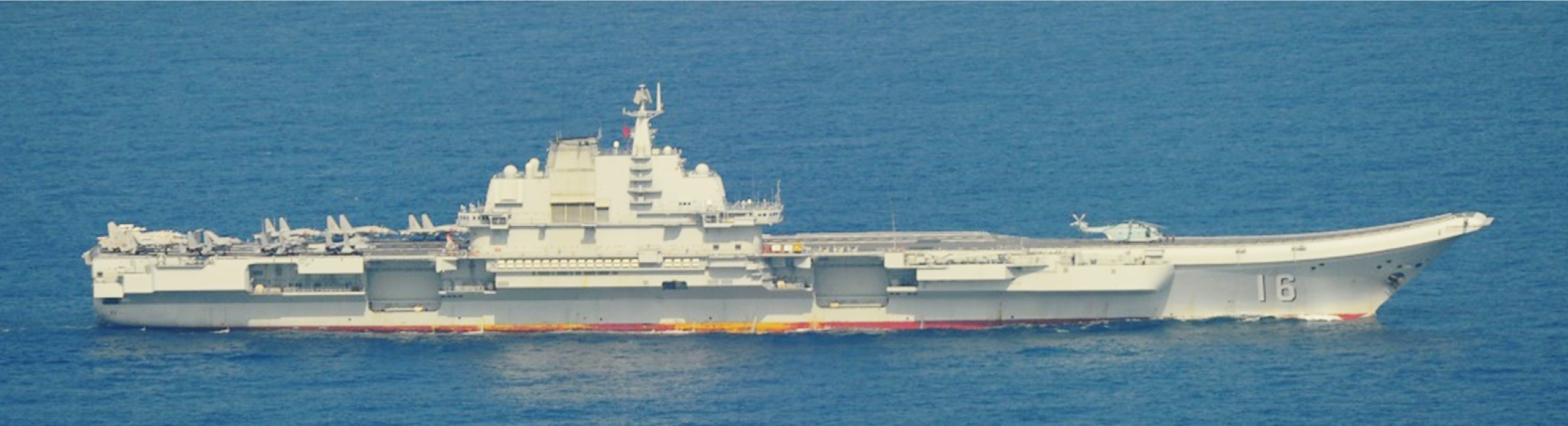
Liaoning at sea (2018)

On 4 November 2012, the People's Liberation Army's website (Chinese: 中国军网) reported that Shenyang J-15s had performed carrier touch-and-go training. On 25 November 2012, China announced that J-15s had made five successful arrested landings on Liaoning. In June 2013, a second round of flight tests began on board Liaoning, with personnel from the fleet air arm of the Brazilian Navy providing carrier training support to the People's Liberation Army Navy Air Force who operate the J-15s.

In August 2014, based on an article from Chinese state media, Western news outlets reported that two pilots had been killed testing jets slated to operate from Liaoning. Chinese military officials stated such reports were misleading, and clarified that deaths were in fact unrelated with tests on the carrier. The original Chinese article from Xinhua also did not link the deaths with the J-15 nor mention any loss of such aircraft.

=== Military exercises ===
==== 2021 ====
On 5 April 2021, the aircraft carrier Liaoning, destroyers Chengdu, Taiyuan, Nanchang, frigate Huanggang and supply ship Hulunhu were spotted between Okinawa and Miyako Island. In December 2021, Liaoning carrier group was deployed to Yellow Sea, East China Sea, and the Western Pacific.

==== 2022 ====
In May 2022, Liaoning and its carrier strike group conducted drills in the East China Sea and they were sighted near Miyako Island by the Japanese Maritime Self-Defense Force. Japanese analysts noted a very high operational tempo from Liaoning, which suggested China's growing confidence and maturity in aircraft carrier operations.

==== 2024 ====
On 14 October 2024, Chinese Eastern Theater Command spokesman Captain Li Xi confirmed that the Liaoning aircraft carrier group was taking part in the Joint Sword-2024B military exercises around Taiwan.

==== 2025 ====
In early June 2025, Liaoning carried out training exercises together with Chinese aircraft carrier Shandong in the Philippine Sea. The exercise was shadowed by ships of the Japan Maritime Self Defense Force. As of 17 June, there had been an estimated 550 landings and takeoffs by aircraft on Liaoning. This deployment was the first time two Chinese carriers operated together beyond the first island chain.

In early December 2025, Liaoning carried out military drills alongside three guided-missile destroyers (reportedly Nanchang, Xining and Kaifeng) in international waters between Minamidaitōjima and Okinawa Island when the Japan Air Self-Defense Force scrambled a pair of Mitsubishi F-15J fighter jets to observe. In response, two Shenyang J-15 fighter jets were launched from the Liaoning to intercept, and thereafter locked-on to the Japanese aircraft with their fire-control radars. Minister of Defence Shinjiro Koizumi later denounced the action as a "dangerous act that exceeded the range necessary for safe aircraft flight", while a Chinese navy spokesman retorted that the Japanese planes had repeatedly approached the Chinese naval taskforce in a deliberate attempt to disrupt their training exercises.

==== 2026 ====
On 19 May 2026, Chinese state broadcaster CCTV announced that a Liaoning-led carrier strike group was on route to the western Pacific to carry out live-fire drills and associated training. A few days later, the Liaoning was detected by the Japanese Maritime Self-Defense Force approximately 880 kilometers southwest of Okinotorishima, where fighter jets and helicopters were observed to have performed takeoffs and landings. A newest generation Type 054B frigate was also observed for the first time escorting the carrier, along with a Type 901 fast combat support ship and a Type 055 destroyer, which led some analysts to assert the PLAN was developing a layered naval formation to mimic that of a United States Navy carrier strike group. The PLAN carrier strike group was later detected on 29 May 2026 around 590 kilometers southeast Miyako Island transiting into the Philippine Sea, having performed naval drills while cruising off the coast of the main Philippine island of Luzon over the previous week.

On 14 October 2026, the PRC Defense Ministry announced that a Liaoning-led carrier strike group had begun annual military training in the western Pacific, while the Japanese Ministry of Defense confirmed they were monitoring carrier-based PLA Navy fighter jets conducting takeoff and landing exercises approximately 250 kilometers to the south of Ishigaki Island. The strike group, which also included Type 052DL destroyer Huainan along with Type 055 destroyers Anshan and Wuxi, was later observed by a JMSDF Kawasaki P-1 heading west to the Luzon Strait. Japanese officials later revealed that the Japan Air Self-Defense Force had launched fighter jets in response to PLA Navy flight operations. The strike group was thereafter monitored by the Armed Forces of the Philippines as it sailed along the Philippines’ western seaboard off Zamboanga del Norte before entering the Celebes Sea, with the last confirmed sighting being 45 kilometers southeast of Balut Island. The strike group was shadowed by Philippine Coast Guard vessel BRP Sarangani during its transit, and when officials challenged regarding having diplomatic clearance the Chinese ships invoked their right of innocent passage, according to Sea Rear Admiral Jay Tarriela. On 29 October 2026, Taiwanese official Joseph Wu announced that the Liaoning-led carrier strike group had completed its circumnavigation of the Philippines and was currently operating in the Philippine Sea to the east of Luzon island.

== Ship Emblem ==
External image
- Emblem of Liaoning.

The emblem of Liaoning has the characters "中国人民解放军海军辽宁舰" ("Chinese PLAN ship Liaoning") at the top and has the ship motto at the bottom.

== See also ==
- List of aircraft carriers
- List of aircraft carriers of Russia and the Soviet Union
- INS Vikramaditya, a Kiev-class aircraft carrier that was also originally built for the Soviet Navy and later sold to India in 2004
- Liu Zhe, the captain of Liaoning
- Chinese aircraft carrier Fujian
