= Chinese destroyer Taiyuan =

Type 052D destroyer of the PLA Navy

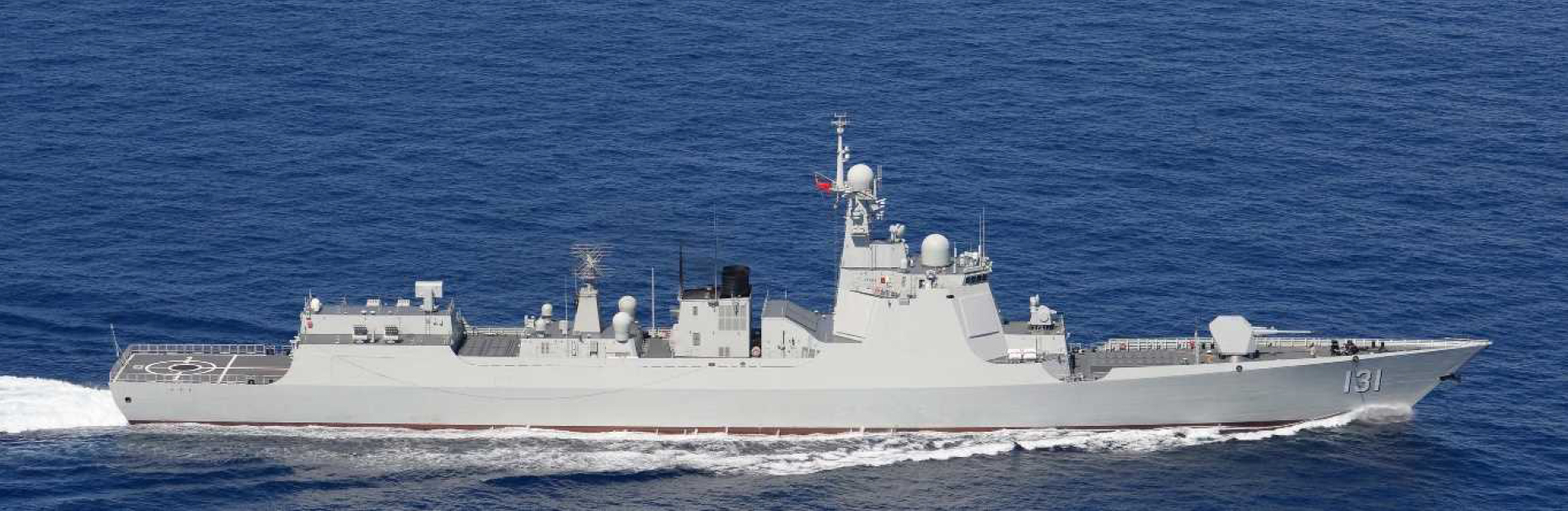
- Taiyuan underway on 29 July 2019

History

China
- Name: Taiyuan
- Namesake: Taiyuan; (太原)
- Builder: Jiangnan Shipyard, Shanghai
- Launched: 28 July 2016
- Commissioned: 12 December 2018
- Identification: Pennant number: 131
- Status: Active

General characteristics
- Class & type: Type 052D destroyer
- Displacement: 7,500 tons (full load)
- Length: 157 m (515 ft)
- Beam: 17 m (56 ft)
- Draught: 6 m (20 ft)
- Propulsion: Combined diesel or gas
- Sensors & processing systems: Type 346 radar; Type 518 radar; Variable depth sonar; Towed array sonar
- Armament: 1 x 130 mm gun; 1 × HQ-10 short-range SAM 24-cell launcher; 64 cell VLS; HHQ-9 SAM; YJ-18 SSM; CY-5 ASW; Type 730 CIWS
- Aircraft carried: Helicopter
- Aviation facilities: Hangar; Helipad

Taiyuan (131) is a Type 052D destroyer of the People's Liberation Army Navy. She was commissioned on 29 November 2018.

== Development and design ==
The basic ship type and layout of the Type 052D guided-missile destroyer is the same as that of the Type 052C destroyer, but compared to the earlier Type 052C destroyer, the Type 052D superstructure has a larger inclination angle and provides better stealth performance. At the same time, the 052C helicopter hangar is located The left side of the hull axis was changed to the center axis of the ship on Type 052D; a pair of small boat storage compartments were added on both sides of the hangar, similar to the design on the Type 054A frigate.

The close in weapon system is composed of a H/PJ-12 short-range defense weapon system located in front of the bridge and a 24 Hongqi-10 air defense missile system located on the top of the hangar, which is combined to form a ladder interception. The original 100mm naval gun was replaced by a higher height and better stealth model H/PJ45 naval gun. On May 13, 2019, the extended version of the 052DL was exposed. The hull of the 052DL is basically the same as the 052D, but the helicopter deck is lengthened to prepare for the Zhi-20 to board the ship.

The Type 52D is the first Chinese surface combatant to use canister-based universal VLS, as opposed to the concentric type VLS carried aboard earlier vessels. 64 cells are carried; 32 forward and 32 aft. The VLS is reportedly an implementation of the GJB 5860-2006 standard. The VLS may fire the extended-range variant of the HHQ-9 surface-to-air missile, YJ-18 anti-ship cruise missiles, and CY-5 anti-submarine missiles.

== Construction and career ==
Taiyuan was the ninth ship of the class and launched on 28 July 2016 at the Jiangnan Shipyard in Shanghai. She was commissioned on 12 December 2018.

On 15 March 2021, Taiyuan, Ningbo and a Type 054A of the East Sea Fleet conducted a live firing exercise. On 5 April 2021, the aircraft carrier Liaoning, Chengdu, Taiyuan, Nanchang, Huanggang and Hulunhu were spotted between Okinawa and Miyako Island.
