= Chinese destroyer Ningbo =

Type 956EM destroyer of the People's Liberation Army Navy

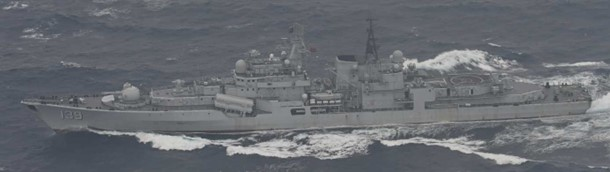
- Ningbo (appearance before the modernization)

History

China
- Name: Ningbo; (宁波)
- Namesake: Ningbo; Vnushitelnyy
- Builder: Severnaya Verf, Saint Petersburg
- Laid down: 15 November 2002
- Launched: 23 July 2004
- Commissioned: 27 September 2006
- Renamed: from Vechnyy; (Вечный)
- Home port: Zhoushan
- Identification: Pennant number: 139
- Status: Active
- Badge: See #Emblem

General characteristics
- Class & type: Type 956EM destroyer
- Displacement: 6,600 tons standard, 8,480 tons full load
- Length: 156 m (511 ft 10 in)
- Beam: 17.3 m (56 ft 9 in)
- Draught: 6.5 m (21 ft 4 in)
- Propulsion: 2 shaft steam turbines, 4 boilers, 75,000 kW (100,000 hp), 2 fixed propellers, 2 turbo generators, and 2 diesel generators
- Speed: 32.7 knots (60.6 km/h; 37.6 mph)
- Range: 3,920 nmi (7,260 km; 4,510 mi) at 18 knots (33 km/h; 21 mph); 1,345 nmi (2,491 km; 1,548 mi) at 33 knots (61 km/h; 38 mph)
- Complement: 350
- Sensors & processing systems: Radar: Air target acquisition radar, 3 × navigation radars, 130 mm gun fire-control radars, 30 mm air-defence gun fire control radar; Sonar: Active and passive under-keel sonar; ES: Tactical situation plotting board, anti-ship missile fire control system, air defence, missile fire-control system, and torpedo fire control system
- Electronic warfare & decoys: After modernization: 96 (4 × 24) H/RJZ-726-4A 24 barrel decoy dispensers; Replaced during modernization: 2 twin barrel PK-2 decoy dispensers (200 rockets)
- Armament: After modernization: 1 dual AK-130 130 mm naval guns; 2 × 30 mm Type 1130 gun-based CIWS (11 barreled rotary gun); 1 × HHQ-10 SAM-based CIWS (24-cell launcher); 8 (2 × 4) YJ-12 or YJ-15 anti-ship missiles; 48 cell (32 + 16) vertical launching systems (VLS) for HQ-16 surface to air missiles (SAM) and Yu-8 anti-submarine missiles; 6 (2 × 3) 324 mm torpedo tubes; Weapens replaced during modernization: 2 Kashtan CIWS; 8 (2 × 4) (SS-N-22 'Sunburn') anti-ship missiles; 2 single-arm launchers for 48 (2 × 24) SA-N-7 'Gadfly' (navalised Buk) surface-to-air missiles; 2 × 2 533 mm torpedo tubes; 2 × 6 RBU-1000 300 mm anti-submarine rocket launchers
- Aircraft carried: 1× Ka-27 series helicopter
- Aviation facilities: Helipad

Ningbo (139) is a Type 956EM destroyer of the People's Liberation Army Navy.

== Development and design ==
A project began in the late 1960s when it was becoming obvious to the Soviet Navy that naval guns still had an important role particularly in support of amphibious landings, but existing gun cruisers and destroyers were showing their age. A new design was started, employing a new 130-millimetre (5.1 in) automatic gun turret.

The Type 956EM ships were 156 metres (512 ft) in length, with a beam of 17.3 metres (56 ft 9 in) and a draught of 6.5 metres (21 ft 4 in).

The Chinese People's Liberation Army Navy Surface Force (PLAN) had two modified Sovremenny class destroyers delivered in December 1999 and November 2000. In 2002, the PLAN ordered two improved versions designated 956-EM. The first vessel was launched in late 2005, while the second was launched in 2006. All four vessels were commissioned to the East Sea Fleet.

The project cost 600 million US$ (mid-1990s price) for Project 956E (two ships), and 1.4 billion US$ (early-2000s price) for Project 956EM (two ships).

== Construction and career ==
Ningbo was laid down on 15 November 2002 and launched on 23 July 2004 by Severnaya Verf in Saint Petersburg. She was commissioned on 27 September 2006.

On 15 March 2021, Taiyuan, Ningbo and a Type 054A of the East Sea Fleet conducted a live firing exercise.

On 14 November 2023 Ningbo engaged divers from HMAS Toowoomba by activating her sonar while divers were removing a fishing net that had become entangled in one of the propellers of the Australian ship. Several RAN divers were slightly injured as a result.

== Emblem ==
The Emblem of Ningbo features the Chinese text "Chinese PLAN ship Ningbo" at the top and has the Russian text "Destroyer Ningbo, PLA Navy" below the Chinese text. At the center of the emblem is the Ningbo, and on its left and right is an anti-ship missile and anti-air missile, respectively. The missiles are shaped similarly to the traditional Chinese polearm Ji.
