= BRP Sarangani =

Philippine Coast Guard patrol vessel

- BRP Sarangani

History

Taiwan
- Name: CG 123 Kinmen
- Namesake: Kinmen
- Owner: Coast Guard Administration
- Builder: Jong Shyn Shipbuilding Company
- Completed: 2008
- Commissioned: February 24, 2008
- Fate: Sold

Philippines
- Name: CG 123 Kinmen
- Namesake: Kinmen
- Owner: Philippine Coast Guard
- Acquired: September 2026
- Commissioned: October 2, 2026

General characteristics
- Class & type: Taipei-class patrol vessel
- Displacement: 688.4 tons
- Length: 65.1 m (213 ft 7 in)
- Beam: 11.72 m (38 ft 5 in)
- Speed: 32 knots (59 km/h)
- Range: 4,600 nautical miles (8,500 km)

BRP Sarangani, formerly known as CG 123 Kinmen, is a Taipei-class patrol vessel of the Philippine Coast Guard.

== Background ==
BRP Sarangani patrol vessel built by the Jong Shyn Shipbuilding Company. It is one of the four Taipei-class vessels commissioned between 2001 and 2008. It was built as Kinmen in 2008.

== History ==
=== CG 123 Kinmen ===
CG 123 Kinmen alongside CG 125 Lienchiang were commissioned on February 24, 2008 with President Chen Shui-bian present in the ceremony. Kinmen and Lienchiang entered service for the Coast Guard Administration (CGA) of Taiwan on March 13, 2008.

Despite being named after the Kinmen islands, the vessel was not announced for permanent deployment in the waters surrounding its namesake until 2012, when CGA announced plans to station Kinmen there. In March 2015, the vessel was deployed to patrol against suspected sand dredging vessels from mainland China operating near the islands.

=== BRP Sarangani ===
The Philippine-based non-government organization We Protect Our Seas (WPS) foundation acquired the now-decommissioned Kinmen and donated it to the Philippine Coast Guard (PCG) in September 21, 2026. Before its transfer, the ship was temporarily designated as Bling No.1 and was observed performing sea trials near Kaohsiung Port. The transfer is the result of "months of coordination" by WPS President and CEO Jeffrey Ordaniel.

WPS Foundation hailed this as the improvement of informal Philippines–Taiwan relations since the Guang Da Xing No. 28 incident in 2013. However, the Chinese government condemned the transfer, arguing that it undermined the One China Policy and accusing Taiwan's ruling Democratic Progressive Party of acting against the interests of Taiwanese fishermen.

The former Kinmen vessel was commissioned to the PCG on October 2, 2026 and was renamed as the BRP Sarangani. As part of the agreement, the Philippine government will not deploy Sarangani in waters related to Taiwan.
