= Shanghai Morning Post =

Chinese-language newspaper

Shanghai Morning Post (Chinese: 新闻晨报; pinyin: Xīnwén Chénbào) is a newspaper published by Jiefang Daily Newspaper Group since January 1, 1999.

The daily circulation of this tabloid newspaper is around 500,000 copies per day.

The name Shanghai Morning Post was also used for an older newspaper which circulated in the first half of the twentieth century at the time of the Shanghai International Settlement.
