= Chinese ship Hulunhu =

Type 901 combat support ship

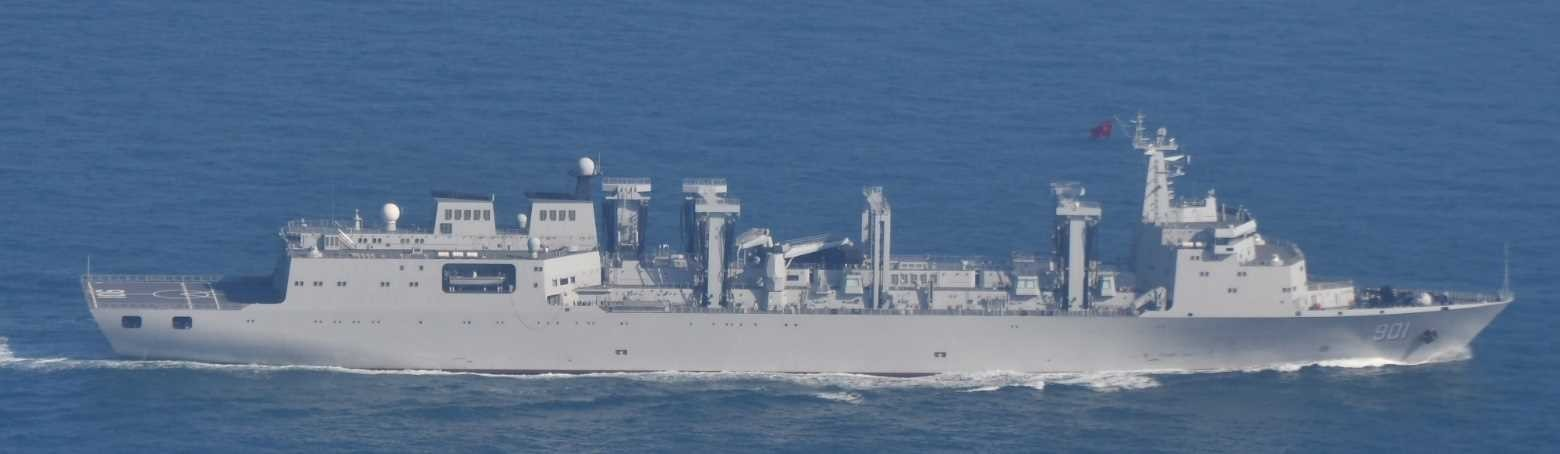
- Hulunhu underway on 17 December 2021

History

China
- Name: Hulunhu; (呼伦湖)
- Namesake: Hulun Lake
- Builder: Huangpu Shipyard, Guangzhou
- Launched: 15 December 2015
- Commissioned: 1 September 2017
- Identification: Pennant number: 965
- Status: Active

General characteristics
- Class & type: Type 901 fast combat support ship
- Displacement: 45,000 tons
- Length: 240 m (787 ft 5 in)
- Beam: 31 m (101 ft 8 in)
- Draft: 10.8m
- Propulsion: 4 × QC280 gas turbines; Total output: 112 MW (150,000 hp)
- Speed: 25 kn (46 km/h; 29 mph)
- Sensors & processing systems: Type 347 radar, ZGJ-1B electro-optical system, and ZFJ-1A fire control system
- Armament: 4 x 30 mm H/PJ-13, helicopter pad

Hulunhu (965) is lead ship of the Type 901 fast combat support ship of the People's Liberation Army Navy.

== Development and design ==
The Type 901 integrated supply ships are the latest generation of super large ocean-going integrated supply ship (fast combat support ship) of the Chinese People's Liberation Army Navy. Compared with the earlier Type 903 integrated supply ship, its replenishment equipment has been greatly improved and improved in performance, which can provide the future Chinese aircraft carrier fleet with replenishment tasks under more complex conditions. Since the top speed of this class of supply ship reaches 25 knots, it will be able to flexibly deploy with the aircraft carrier fleet.

The Type 901 is estimated to have a 45,000 ton displacement and a beam of 31.5 metres. The ship is powered by four QC280 gas turbines, each delivering 28 MW, for maximum speed of about 25 kt; the speed is necessary to keep up with carriers. The Type 901 is more than twice the size of the preceding Type 903A and significantly faster.

The Type 901 appears to be designed with similar missions to the Supply-class fast combat support ship of the United States Navy, which is used to keep large surface action groups supplied.

== Construction and career ==
She was launched on 15 December 2015 at Huangpu Shipyard in Guangzhou and commissioned on 1 September 2017 into the North Sea Fleet. On September 1, 2017, the naming and flag award ceremony of Hulunhu, the first ship of the Navy's new integrated supply ship. Commander Shen Jinlong attended the ceremony and delivered a speech. A satellite photo on October 21, shows that the Hulunhu has rendezvous with Liaoning and was moored together at a military port. This means that since Liaoning entered service in September 2012, the Liaoning carrier fleet, which has been lacking a dedicated supply ship for five years, finally has the ability to cruise long oceans.

On 12 April 2018, South China Sea Naval Review were conducted composed of 48 warships, notably Liaoning, Linyi, Xuchang, Shijiazhuang, Lanzhou, Haikou and Hulunhu.

Liaoning's task force which consist of Hulunhu and 4 other ships were spotted in the Western Pacific on 12 April 2020.

== Gallery ==
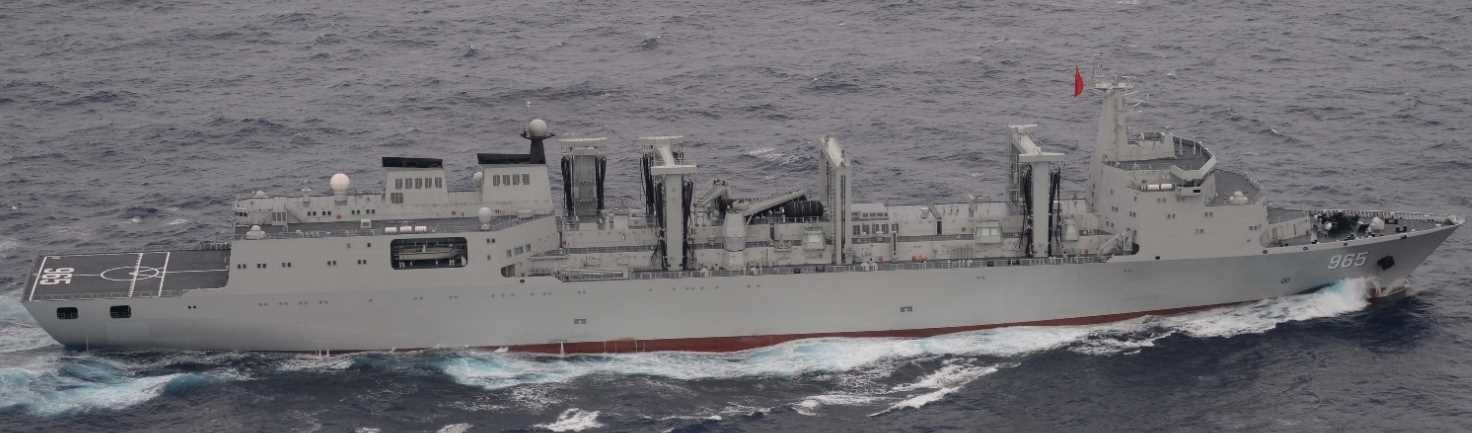
Hulunhu underway on 11 June 2019.

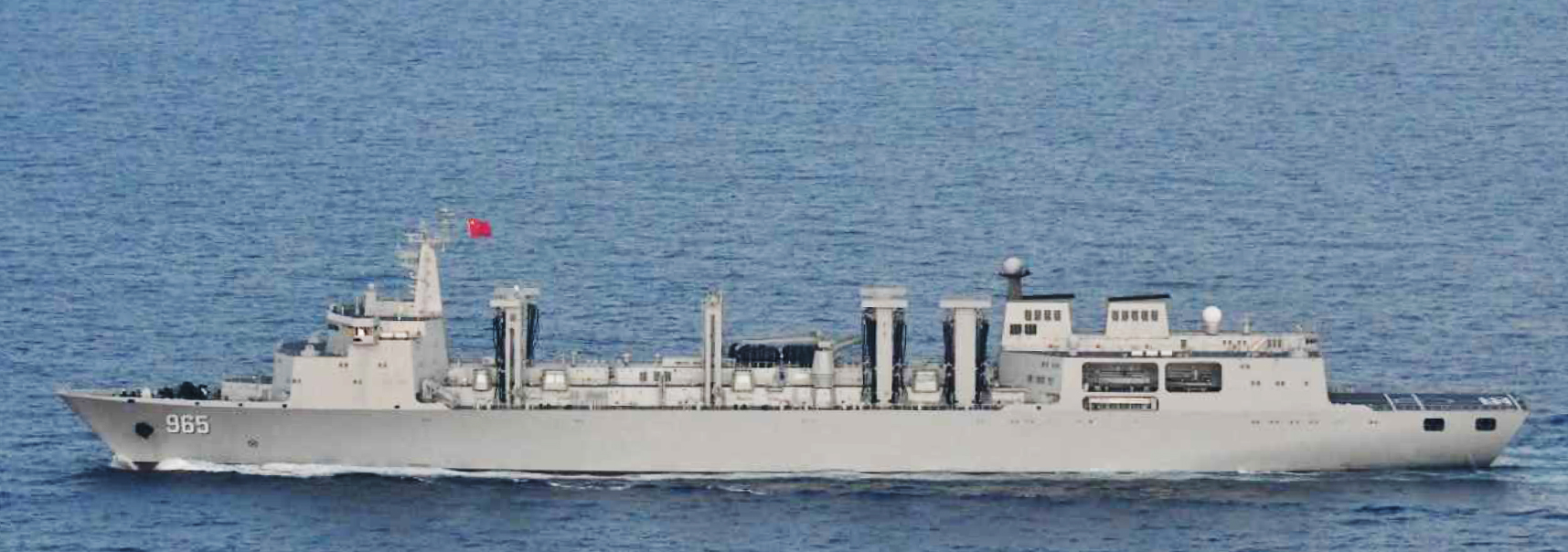
Hulunhu underway on 26 July 2019

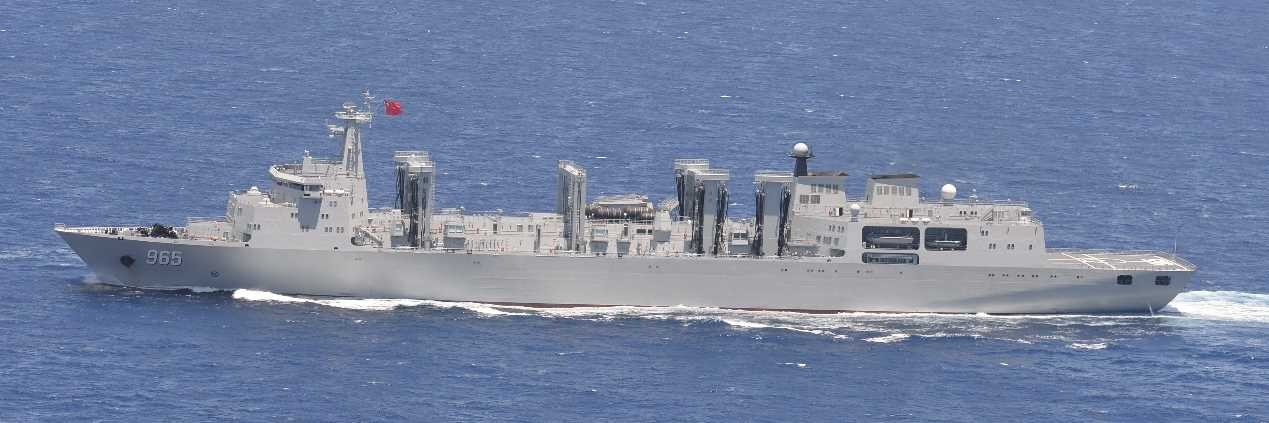
Hulunhu underway on 1 August 2019.

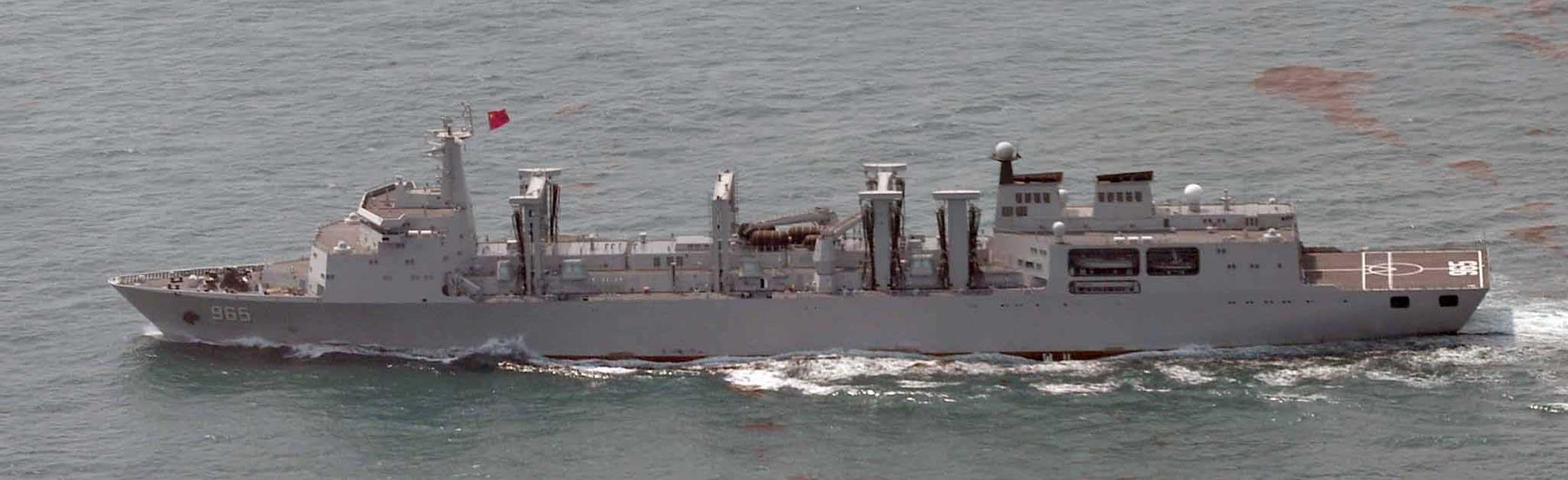
Hulunhu underway on 11 April 2020.
