= 2025 China Victory Day Parade =

Military parade in Beijing, China

Conference to Commemorate the 80th Anniversary of the Victory of the Chinese People's War of Resistance Against Japanese Aggression and the World Anti-Fascist War 纪念中国人民抗日战争暨世界反法西斯战争胜利80周年大会
- Logo of 2025 China Victory Day Parade

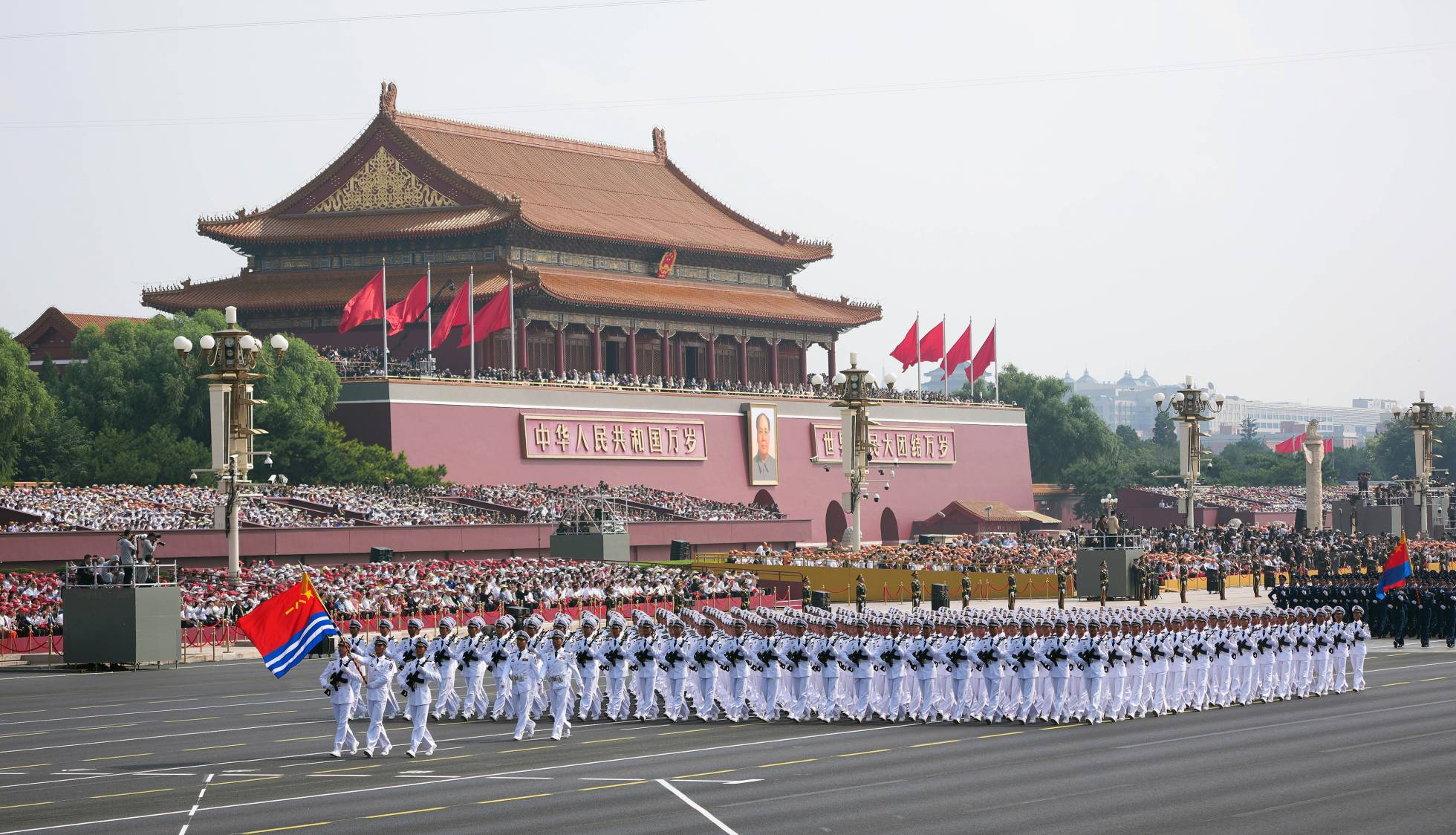
- People's Liberation Army Navy soldiers participate in the 80th Victory Day parade in Beijing, 3 September 2025
- Genre: Military parade
- Date: 3 September 2025
- Locations: Chang'an Avenue, Tiananmen Square, Beijing, China
- Coordinates: 39°54′26.4″N 116°23′27.9″E
- Previous event: 2015 China Victory Day Parade
- Participants: Party and state leaders
- General Secretary of the CCP: Xi Jinping (Note: CCP General Secretary Xi Jinping has also served as Chairman of the CCP Central Military Commission, the supreme commander of the armed forces since 2012.)
- Organiser: Chinese Communist Party (CCP); Central Military Commission (CMC)
- People: Li Qiang (Premier and host)

The 80th Anniversary of the Victory of the Chinese People's War of Resistance Against Japanese Aggression and the World Anti-Fascist War was a military parade held on Chang'an Avenue, Beijing, on 3 September 2025 to celebrate the 80th anniversary of the end of the Second Sino-Japanese War and the Second World War, collectively termed by the Chinese government as the "World Anti-Fascist War".

Over 12,000 troops of the People's Liberation Army participated in the parade. This event marked the fourth large-scale celebration since Xi Jinping became the general secretary of the Chinese Communist Party in 2012. This parade marked the 19th major military parade since the founding of the People's Republic of China in 1949 and the second to commemorate the victory over Japan through a military parade, following the 2015 parade. A total of 26 world leaders attended the parade, including Russian president Vladimir Putin and North Korean leader Kim Jong Un.

== Preparations ==
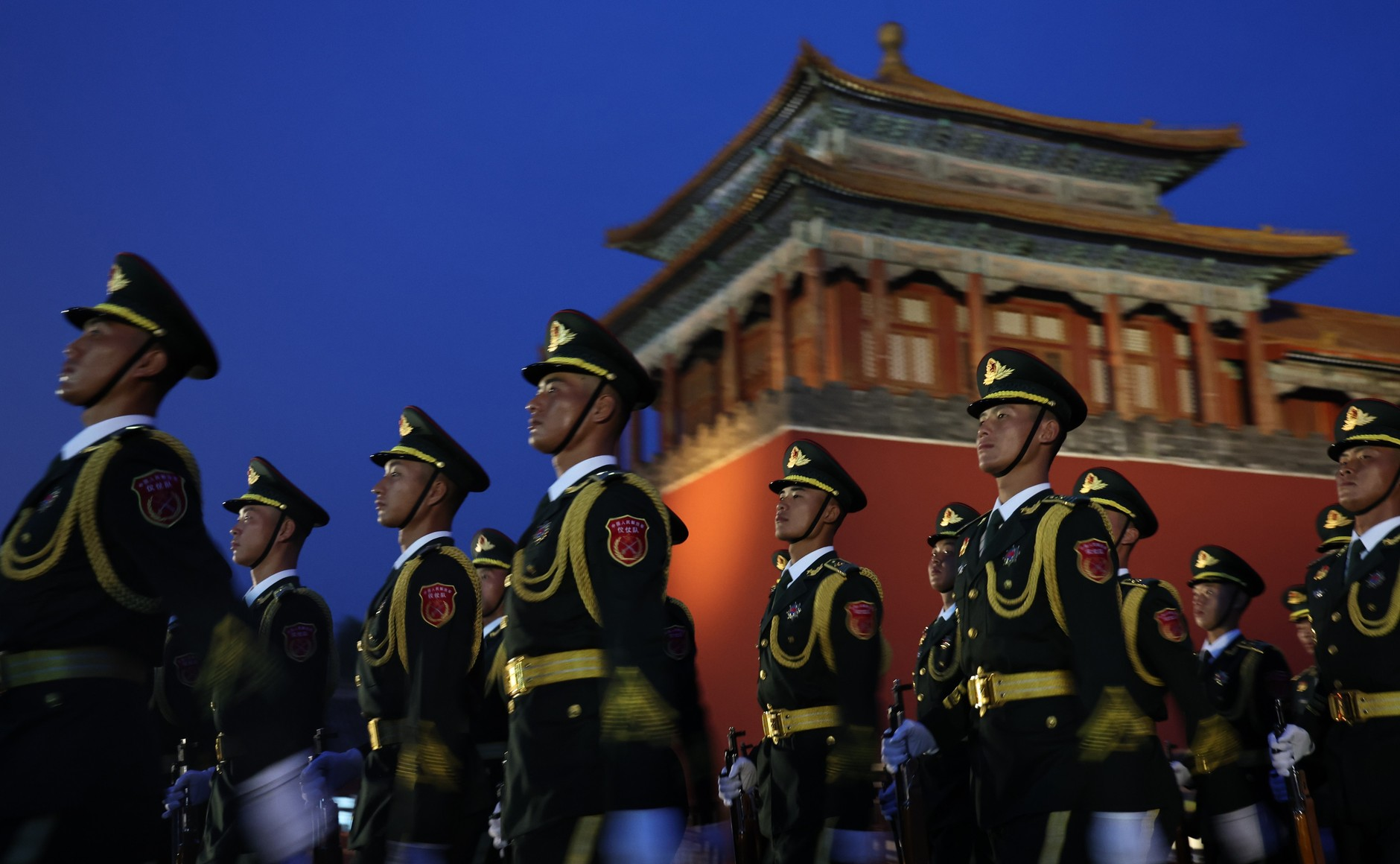
Military personnel preparing for the parade

The official logo for the event was officially unveiled by the State Council Information Office on 13 May 2025. Senior PLA officer Wu Zeke stated in June 2025 that the parade will feature "new-type combat capabilities" as well as a speech by CCP general secretary Xi Jinping.

== Opening remarks ==
In his opening remarks, Xi stated that "through immense national sacrifice, the Chinese people made a major contribution to saving human civilization and safeguarding world peace" and that the People's Liberation Army has always been a "heroic force that the party and the people can fully trust." He went on to say that "Today, humanity is again faced with the choice of peace or war," that the Chinese people "firmly stand on the right side of history," that China will "never intimidated by any bullies" and that the "rejuvenation of the Chinese nation" was unstoppable.

== Parade groups ==
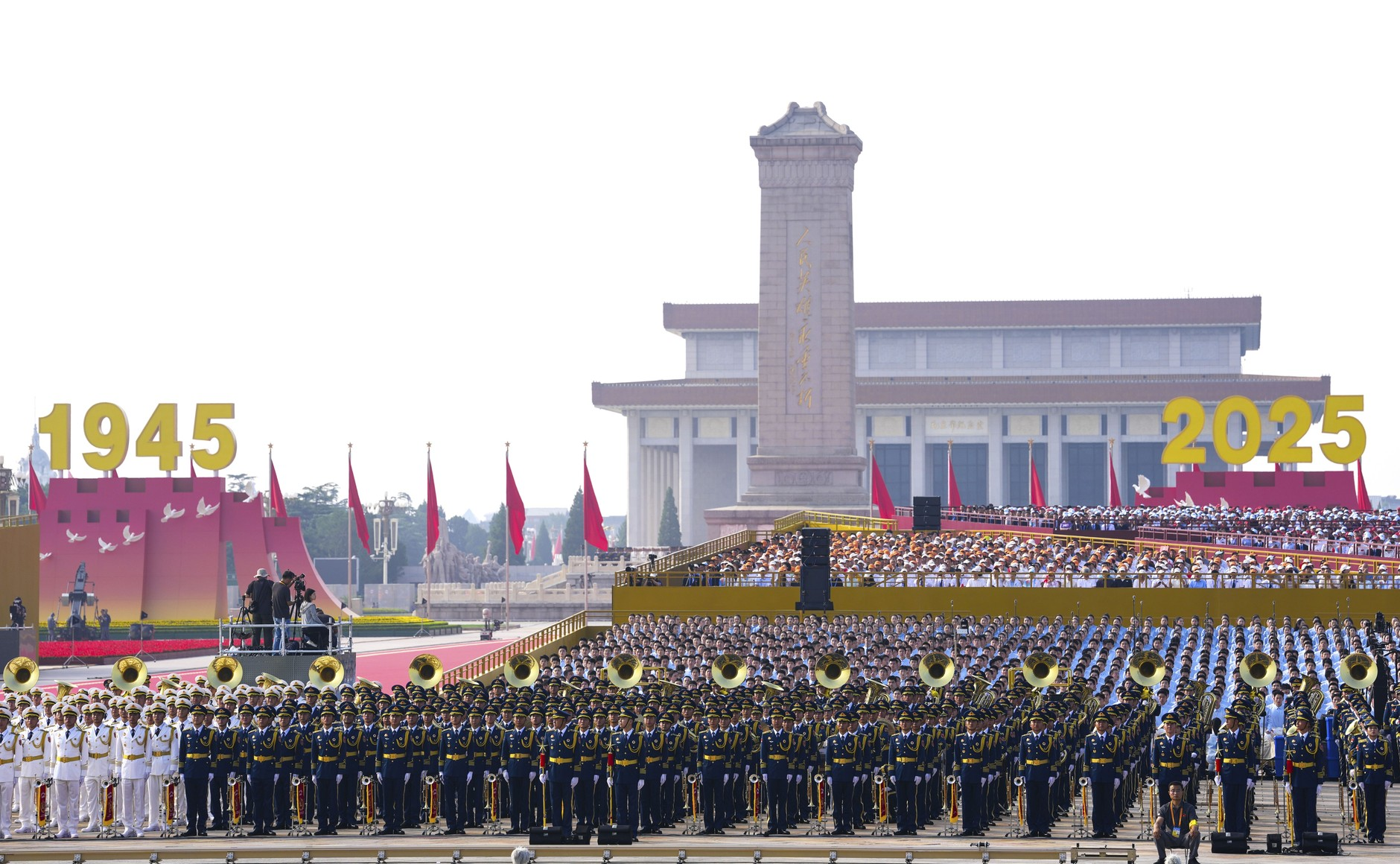
Line-up of the parade groups

The following are the parade groups attended the parade marchpast:

=== Marchpast column ===
In order of appearance:

- PLA Tri-service Guard of Honor Battalion
- Ground Force battalion (provided by units related to the Eight Route Army and New Fourth Army)
- Navy battalion
- Air Force battalion
- Rocket Force battalion
- Aerospace Force battalion
- Cyberspace Force battalion
- Information Support Force battalion
- Joint Logistics Support Force battalion
- People's Armed Police battalion (provided by Armed Police Beijing Corps)
- Reserve Force reservist battalion
- Militia battalion (provided by the Women's Militia)
- China UN Peacekeepers battalion (provided by 81st Group Army PLAGF)

=== Mobile column ===
In order of appearance:

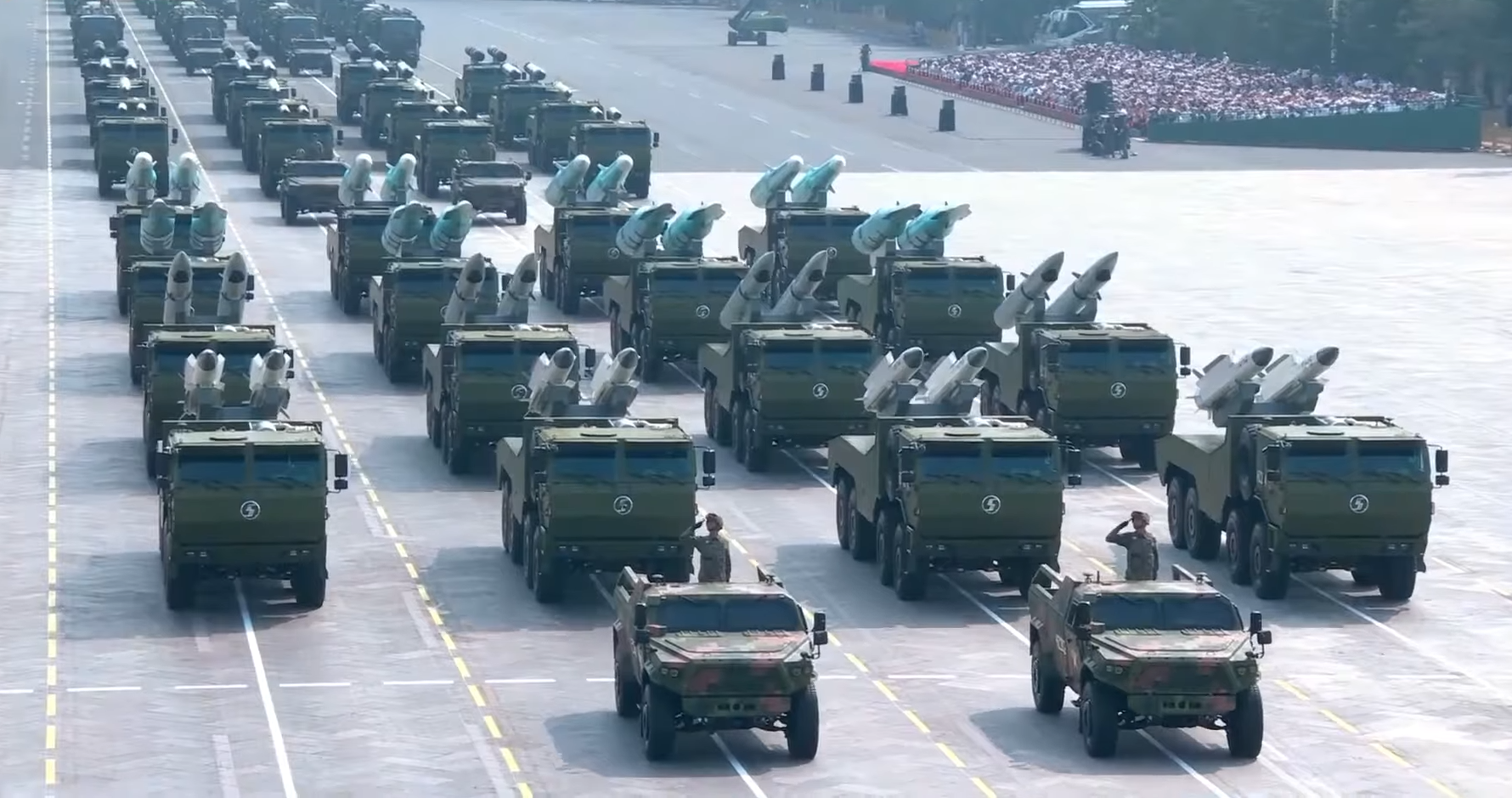
YJ-15, YJ-17, YJ-19 and YJ-20 anti-ship missiles at the 2025 China Victory Day Parade

- Banner formation of 80 honorary battalions
- Ground assault formation
  - Type 99B main battle tanks
  - Type 100 main battle tanks
  - Type 100 support vehicles
- Amphibious assault formation
  - ZTL-11 wheeled assault guns
  - ZBL-09 infantry fighting vehicles
  - ZLL-09 self-propelled howitzers
- Airborne assault formation
  - an unnamed airborne armored personnel carrier
  - an unnamed airborne infantry fight vehicle
  - an unnamed airborne mortar carrier
- Long-range artillery formation
  - PHL-16 multiple rocket launchers
- Naval air defense formation
  - HHQ-9C naval air defense missile
  - HQ-16C medium-range air defense missile
  - HQ-10A short-range air defense missile
  - LY-1 laser air defense system
- Anti-ship missile formation
  - YJ-15 supersonic anti-ship cruise missile
  - YJ-19 hypersonic anti-ship cruise missile
  - YJ-17 hypersonic anti-ship glide vehicle
  - YJ-20 hypersonic anti-ship ballistic missile
- Underwater weapon formation
  - AMB012 light torpedo
  - AJC015 rocket-launched lightweight torpedo
  - AQA010 heavy torpedo
  - AQS003A torpedo-launched mine
- Early-warning detection formation
  - Type 4 high-mobility radar system
- Air Defense formation
  - HQ-11 short/medium-range combined missile-and-gun air defense system
  - HQ-9C long-range air defense missile
  - HQ-20 medium-range air defense missile
  - HQ-22A medium/long-range semi-active radar homing/command guidance air defence system
  - HQ-19 anti-ballistic/anti-satellite missile
  - HQ-29 anti-ballistic/anti-satellite missile
- Anti-Drone warfare formation
  - OW5
  - FK-3000
  - Hurricane 3000
- Cyberspace combat formation
  - Type 4 cyberwarfare system
- Electronic countermeasure formation
  - Type 5 electronic countermeasure system
- Information support formation
- Unmanned land combat formation
  - ZRY222 unmanned ground combat vehicle
  - ZRZ100 unmanned ground combat vehicle
  - GPJ221 unmanned mine-clearing vehicle
  - CWB221 unmanned transport vehicle with quadcopter and robot wolves
- Unmanned maritime combat formation
  - HSU100 unmanned underwater vehicle
  - Unmanned combat surface vehicle
  - AJX002 extra large uncrewed underwater vehicle
- Unmanned aerial combat formation
  - Hongdu GJ-11 Sharp Sword stealth unmanned combat aerial vehicle (UCAV)
  - CAIG Wing Loong II medium-altitude long-endurance unmanned combat aerial vehicle.
  - Type A, a tailless lambda wing UCAV
  - Type B, a tailless modified delta wing UCAV
  - Type D, a canted tail delta wing Manned-unmanned teaming drone
  - Type E, a canted tail swept wing Manned-unmanned teaming drone
  - A shipborne vertical take-off and landing unmanned rotorcraft
- Logistics support formation
- Equipment support formation
- Cruise missile formation
  - CJ-20A air-launched cruise missile
  - YJ-18C anti-ship cruise missile
  - CJ-1000 hypersonic anti-ship cruise missile
- Hypersonic missile formation
  - YJ-21 hypersonic anti-ship ballistic missile
  - DF-17 hypersonic glide vehicle medium-range ballistic missile
  - DF-26D intermediate-range ballistic missile
- 1st Nuclear missile formation
  - JL-1 air-launched ballistic missile
  - JL-3 submarine launched intercontinental ballistic missile
  - DF-61 intercontinental ballistic missile
  - DF-31BJ intercontinental ballistic missile
- 2nd Nuclear missile formation
  - DF-5C intercontinental ballistic missile

=== Flypast column ===
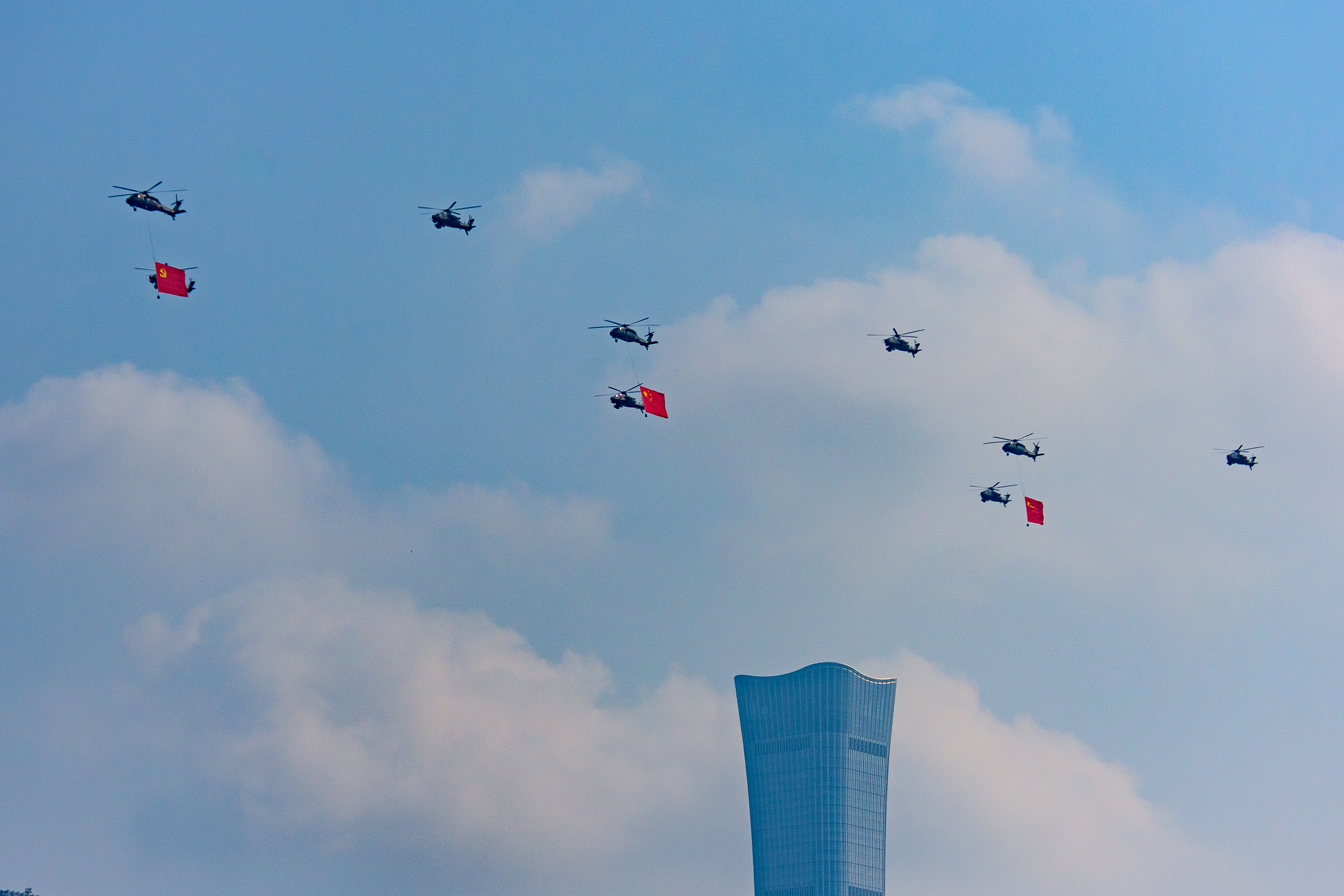
Flag-guard group

In order of appearance:

- Flag-guard group (this group appeared prior to the "Marchpast column")
  - Z-20 medium-lift utility helicopters with the flag of the Chinese Communist Party, the flag of China, and the flag of the PLA
  - Z-10 attack helicopters as escorts
  - Z-19 light attack helicopters in the formation of "80"
  - Z-8L heavy transport helicopters with Banners of "Justice shall prevail", "Peace shall prevail", and "People shall prevail"
  - Z-20T heavy attack helicopters as escorts
- Airborne early warning and control (AEWC) group
  - KJ-500A AEW&C aircraft
  - KJ-600 carrier-based AEW&C aircraft
  - J-16s and J-15Ts as escorts
- Special missions group
  - Y-9Q anti-submarine/maritime patrol aircraft
  - Y-9DZ electronic intelligence aircraft
  - Y-9LG electronic-warfare aircraft
  - J-16s as escorts
- Transport group
  - Y-20A strategic airlifters
  - Y-20B strategic airlifters
- Bomber group
  - H-6N nuclear bombers
  - H-6J maritime-strike bombers
  - H-6K conventional bombers
- Refueller group
  - YY-20A aerial tanker
  - H-6Ns, J-16s and J-20s as recipient aircraft

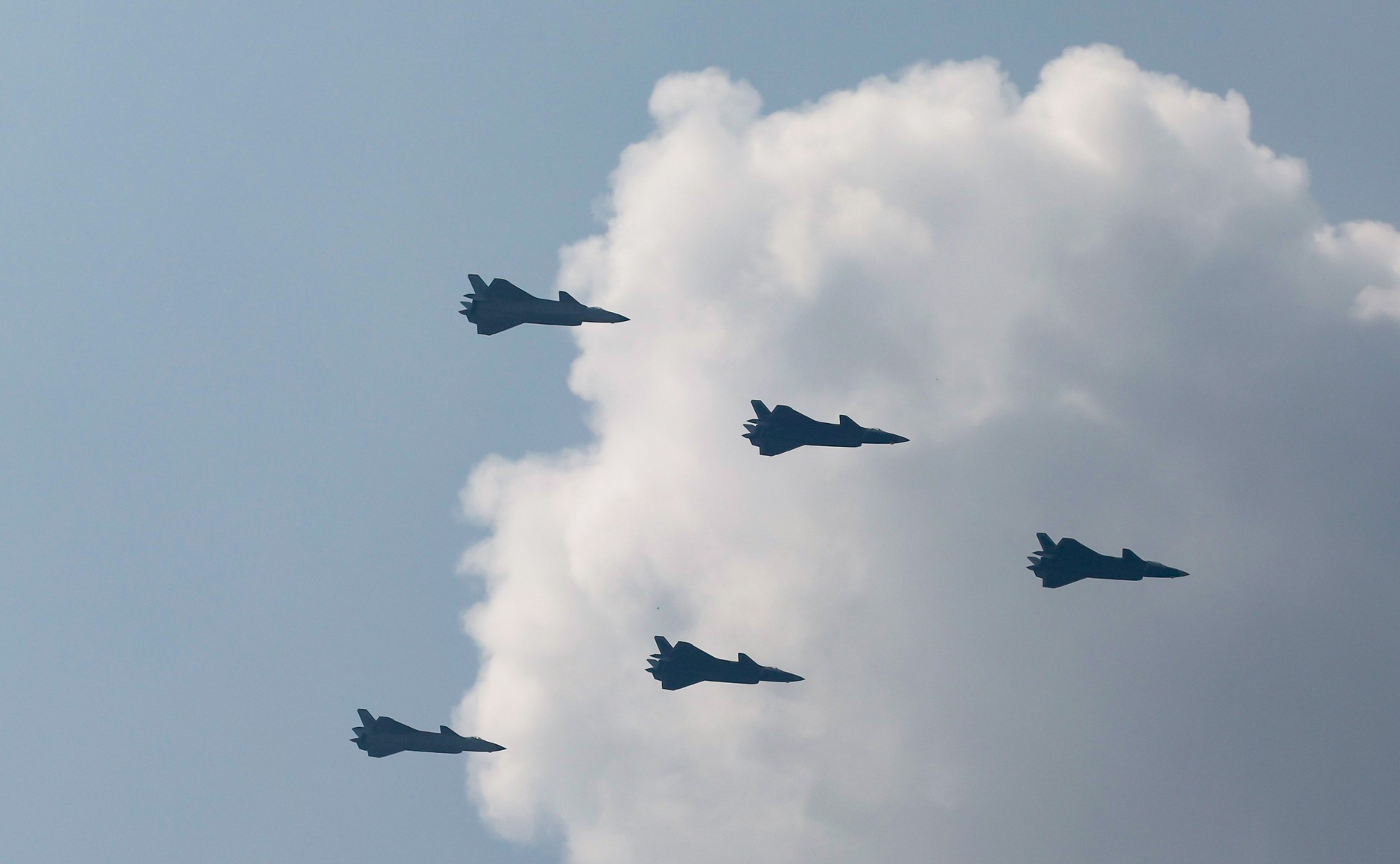
Chengdu J-20 aircraft at the Victory Parade

- Fighter group
  - J-16D electronic-warfare aircraft
  - J-20 stealth air-superiority fighters
  - J-20A stealth air-superiority fighters
  - J-20S stealth air-superiority fighters
  - J-35A stealth multirole fighters
- Carrier-based group
  - J-15DH electronic-warfare aircraft
  - J-15DT CATOBAR-capable electronic warfare aircraft
  - J-15T CATOBAR-capable multirole fighters
  - J-35 CATOBAR-capable multirole fighters
- Trainer group
  - JL-10 advanced jet trainers
  - J-10S jet trainers
- August 1st Aerobatics Team
  - J-10CY aerobatics aircraft

== Music setting ==
The music is conducted by the Central Military Band of PLA, with the music setting below:

Session	Songs
Prelude	Along the Songhua River (松花江上), On the Taihang Mount (在太行山上), Yellow River Cantata (保卫黄河), Without the Communist Party, There Would Be No New China (没有共产党就没有新中国)
Arrival of guests and flag raising	Welcome March (欢迎进行曲), March of the Volunteers (义勇军进行曲), Bugle of Attendance (出场号角)
Inspection	Bugle of Inspection (检阅号角), Bugle of Salute (敬礼号角), Military Anthem of the People's Liberation Army (中国人民解放军进行曲), Inspection March (检阅进行曲), The People's Army is Loyal to the Party (人民军队忠于党), Three Rules of Discipline and Eight Points for Attention (三大纪律八项注意), Song of a Strong Army (强军战歌), Rush to Glory (光荣奔赴), Please Inspect (请你检阅)
Ground Marchpast	Bugle of Marchpast (分列式号角), Marchpast March (分列式进行曲), March of the Steel Torrent (钢铁洪流进行曲), People's Army March (人民陆军进行曲), People's Navy Marches Forward (人民海军向前进), Chinese Air Force March (中国空军进行曲), March of Information Thunderstorm (信息风雷进行曲), March of Unmanned Intelligent Victory (无人智胜进行曲), Logistics Support Force March (联勤保障部队进行曲), Rocket Force March (火箭军进行曲)
Flyby squad	I Love the Motherland's Blue Skies (我爱祖国的蓝天), Victory March (胜利进行曲)
End of Parade	Ode to the Motherland (歌唱祖国)

== Reception ==
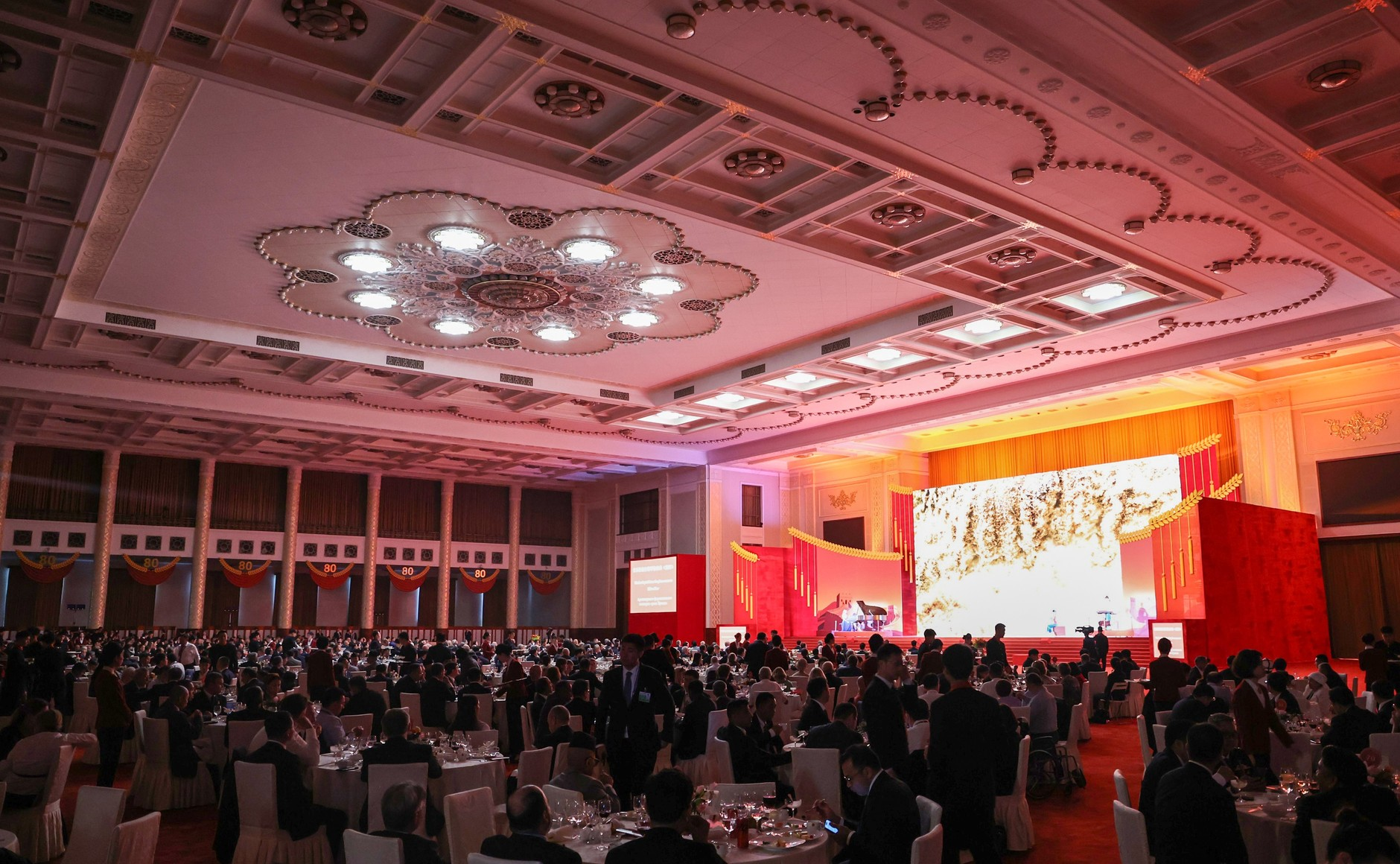
Reception for the parade

The reception was held at 11:30 am BST. CCP general secretary Xi Jinping received guests from the party, government and military, veterans and their descendants, and invitees from Hong Kong, Macau, Taiwan and the diaspora.

== Gala performance ==
A gala performance was held in 8pm BST, the sequence of the performance is listed below:

Act	Programme	Songs & Dances
Prelude	1. Symphonic Poem "Remember the Mountains and Rivers"	
Act 1: Rage, Yellow River	2. Dramatic scene "The Chinese Nation at the Most Critical Period"	The Sungari River
Act 1: Rage, Yellow River	3. Song-and-dance “The Blood-Stained Birch Forest”	
Act 1: Rage, Yellow River	4. Dance “Elegy (Shāng)”	
Act 1: Rage, Yellow River	5. Recitation & chorus “Roar, Yellow River”	
Act 2: Red Star Over China	6. Poetic scene recitation “This Beam of Light”	Ode to Yan'an
Act 2: Red Star Over China	7. Song-and-dance “Yan’an! Yan’an!”	Northern Shaanxi folk song “The East Is Red”
Act 2: Red Star Over China	7. Song-and-dance “Yan’an! Yan’an!”	Shaanxi–Gansu–Ningxia folk song “Great Military–Civilian Production” (melody, excerpt)
Act 2: Red Star Over China	7. Song-and-dance “Yan’an! Yan’an!”	Song “Anti-Japanese Military and Political University Anthem”
Act 2: Red Star Over China	7. Song-and-dance “Yan’an! Yan’an!”	Shaanxi–Gansu–Ningxia folk song “A Tower Ten-Thousand-Zhang High Rises from the Plain”
Act 2: Red Star Over China	8. Dramatic scene “Cave Dwellings and Trenches”	Children's rhyme “Big Red Dates”
Act 2: Red Star Over China	8. Dramatic scene “Cave Dwellings and Trenches”	Northern Shaanxi folk song “Song of the Anti-Japanese Soldiers Setting Out”
Act 3: An Invincible Strength	9. Group dance & group song “Beacon Fires Everywhere”	Song “Song of the Qiongya Independent Column”
Act 3: An Invincible Strength	9. Group dance & group song “Beacon Fires Everywhere”	“Guerrilla Song”
Act 3: An Invincible Strength	9. Group dance & group song “Beacon Fires Everywhere”	“Tunnel Warfare”
Act 3: An Invincible Strength	9. Group dance & group song “Beacon Fires Everywhere”	“Pluck My Beloved Rustic Pipa”
Act 3: An Invincible Strength	9. Group dance & group song “Beacon Fires Everywhere”	“Go to the Enemy’s Rear” (melody, excerpt)
Act 3: An Invincible Strength	10. Dramatic play “The Eternal Unit Number”	
Act 3: An Invincible Strength	11. Men's group dance “Fight to the Bitter End”	Song “On the Taihang Mountains”
Act 4: A Shared Dawn	12. Dance “Riding the Wind”	
Act 4: A Shared Dawn	13. Situational singing “Immortal Melody”	Song “The Little Path”
Act 4: A Shared Dawn	13. Situational singing “Immortal Melody”	Song “Red River Valley”
Act 4: A Shared Dawn	13. Situational singing “Immortal Melody”	Song "Ah, Friends, Goodbye"
Act 4: A Shared Dawn	14. Song “Medal of the Nameless”	
Act 5: Justice Everlasting	15. Dialogic scene “As You Wish”	“I Love You, China” (melody, excerpt)
Act 5: Justice Everlasting	16. Ceremonial guard performance “Guarding Justice”	“March of the Steel Torrent” (melody, excerpt)
Act 5: Justice Everlasting	17. Lead singing & chorus “Unstoppable”	
Epilogue	18. Song-and-dance “Shared Destiny”	

== Invited guests and dignitaries ==
According to the Chinese assistant foreign minister Hong Lei, a total of 26 world leaders attended the parade. The following leaders and dignitaries attended the parade:

=== China ===
- Xi Jinping, General Secretary of the CCP, President of the PRC and Chairman of the CMC
- Li Qiang, Member of the Politburo Standing Committee and Premier of the State Council
- Zhao Leji, Member of the Politburo Standing Committee and Chairman of the NPCSC
- Wang Huning, Member of the Politburo Standing Committee and Chairman of the CPPCC National Committee
- Cai Qi, Member of the Politburo Standing Committee, Secretariat and Director of the General Office of the CCP
- Ding Xuexiang, Member of the Politburo Standing Committee and Vice Premier of the State Council
- Li Xi, Member of the Politburo Standing Committee and Secretary of the Central Commission for Discipline Inspection
- Former CCP Politburo Standing Committee members Li Ruihuan, Wen Jiabao, Jia Qinglin, Zhang Dejiang, Yu Zhengsheng, Li Zhanshu, Wang Yang, Li Lanqing, Zeng Qinghong, Wu Guanzheng, Li Changchun, He Guoqiang, Liu Yunshan, Wang Qishan, and Zhang Gaoli
- Han Zheng, Vice President of the PRC
- Members of the 20th Politburo of the CCP and Central Secretariat of the CCP
- Vice Chairpersons of NPCSC, State councilors, Chief Justice of SPC, Prosecutor General of SPP, Vice Chairperson of CPPCC National Committee
- John Lee Ka-chiu, Chief Executive of Hong Kong and his delegation of approximately 360 people
- Sam Hou Fai, Chief Executive of Macau and members of his delegation

==== Taiwan ====
- Communist: Chang Li-chi
- Kuomintang: Hung Hsiu-chu, He Luying, Li Te-wei, Hsu Cheng-wen
- New Party: Wu Cherng-dean, Lee Sheng-feng, You Chihbin, Tsao Yuanchang, Kuo Kuanying
- Labor Party: Wu Jung-yuan
- Reunification Alliance Party: Li Shang-hsien
- Non-partisan: Stella Chou, Wan Ju-cheng,

=== International ===
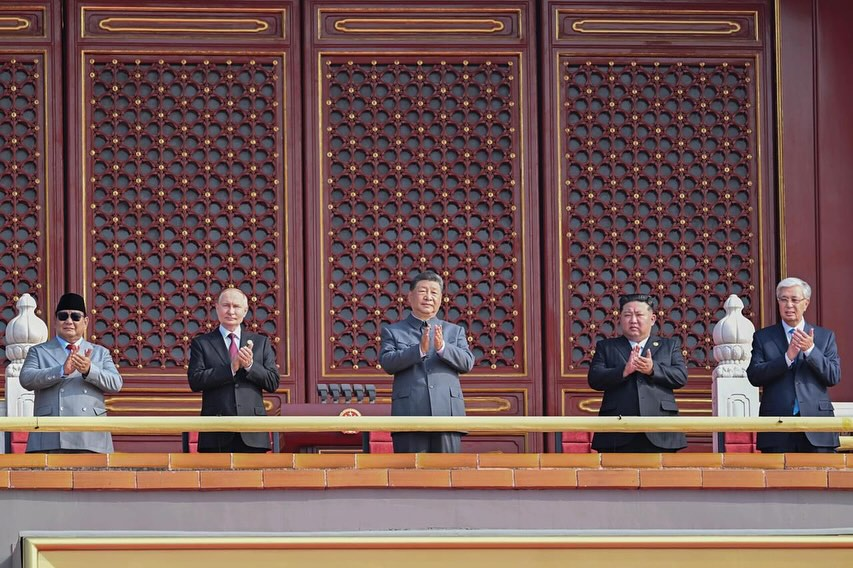
Indonesian President Prabowo Subianto, Russian President Vladimir Putin, CCP General Secretary Xi Jinping, North Korean leader Kim Jong Un and Kazakh President Kassym-Jomart Tokayev at China's Victory Day military parade

Foreign dignitaries attending the ceremony China Attendance by head of state or government Attendance by legislature speaker or deputy prime minister Attendance by high-level representative No official representatives

==== Heads of state and government ====
- President Vladimir Putin of Russia.
- General Secretary and President of State Affairs Kim Jong Un of North Korea.
- President Prabowo Subianto of Indonesia.
- President Kassym-Jomart Tokayev of Kazakhstan.
- King Norodom Sihamoni of Cambodia.
- President Lương Cường of Vietnam.
- General Secretary and President Thongloun Sisoulith of Laos.
- Prime Minister Anwar Ibrahim of Malaysia.
- President Ukhnaagiin Khurelsukh of Mongolia.
- Prime Minister Shehbaz Sharif of Pakistan.
- Prime Minister K. P. Sharma Oli of Nepal.
- President Mohamed Muizzu of Maldives.
- President Shavkat Mirziyoyev of Uzbekistan.
- President Emomali Rahmon of Tajikistan.
- President Sadyr Japarov of Kyrgyzstan.
- President Serdar Berdimuhamedov of Turkmenistan.
- President Alexander Lukashenko of Belarus.
- President Ilham Aliyev of Azerbaijan.
- Prime Minister Nikol Pashinyan of Armenia.
- President Masoud Pezeshkian of Iran.
- (Republic of the Congo) President Denis Sassou Nguesso of Congo.
- President Emmerson Mnangagwa of Zimbabwe.
- President Aleksandar Vučić of Serbia.
- Prime Minister Robert Fico of Slovakia. Fico was the only leader of an EU member state to attend.
- First Secretary and President Miguel Díaz-Canel of Cuba.
- Acting President Min Aung Hlaing of Myanmar.

==== Parliament speakers and deputy prime ministers ====
- Speaker of the National Assembly Woo Won-shik of South Korea.
- President of the National Parliament Maria Fernanda Lay of Timor-Leste.
- President of the National Assembly Jorge Rodríguez of Venezuela.
- Deputy Prime Minister Gan Kim Yong of Singapore.
- Deputy Prime Minister Kamel al-Wazir of Egypt.
- Deputy Prime Minister Atanas Zafirov of Bulgaria.

==== High-level representatives ====
- Chief Advisor to the President Celso Amorim of Brazil.
- Ambassador to China Marcos Galvão of Brazil.
- Presidential Adviser Laureano Ortega Murillo of Nicaragua.
- Foreign Minister Péter Szijjártó of Hungary.
- Armed Forces Commander Haszaimi Bol Hassan of Brunei.
- National Security Adviser Khalilur Rahman of Bangladesh.
- Chief of Army Staff Asim Munir of Pakistan.
- Foreign Minister Hakan Fidan of Turkey.
- Energy and Natural Resources Minister Alparslan Bayraktar of Turkey.

==== International organizations ====
- Secretary General Kao Kim Hourn of ASEAN.
- (Commonwealth of Independent States) Secretary General Sergei Lebedev of CIS.
- Under Secretary General Li Junhua of the United Nations.
- President Dilma Rousseff of the New Development Bank.
- Secretary General Nurlan Yermekbayev of the Shanghai Cooperation Organization.

==== Former politicians ====
- Former Prime Minister Yukio Hatoyama of Japan.
- Former Prime Minister Yves Leterme of Belgium.
- Former President Ueli Maurer of Switzerland.
- Former Prime Minister George Papandreou of Greece.
- Former Prime Minister Massimo D'Alema of Italy.
- Former Prime Minister Adrian Năstase of Romania.
- Former Prime Minister Viorica Dăncilă of Romania.
- Former Prime Minister John Key of New Zealand.
- Former Prime Minister Helen Clark of New Zealand.
- Former Foreign Minister and NSW Premier Bob Carr of Australia.
- (Victoria (state)) Former Victorian Premier Daniel Andrews of Australia.

== Related events ==
=== Human lifespan hot mic ===
A hot mic incident occurred as the leaders are walking on their way up to Tiananmen Gate, with Xi Jinping and Vladimir Putin discussing organ transplants and "immortality". This conversation is caught recorded by China Central Television's public broadcast. During the conversation, Putin spoke about biotechnology and "human organs will continue to be transplanted, and people will became younger and younger". Xi responded to Putin, talking about how people predicted that life expectancy can reach up to 150 years and how 70 years old still is quite young compared to the past. At the press conference during the evening, Putin clarified to Russian media that he and Xi did discuss about the topic of human lifespan. The Chinese government subsequently censored the exchange, ordering news agencies such as Reuters to remove it.

=== Inter-Korean meeting ===
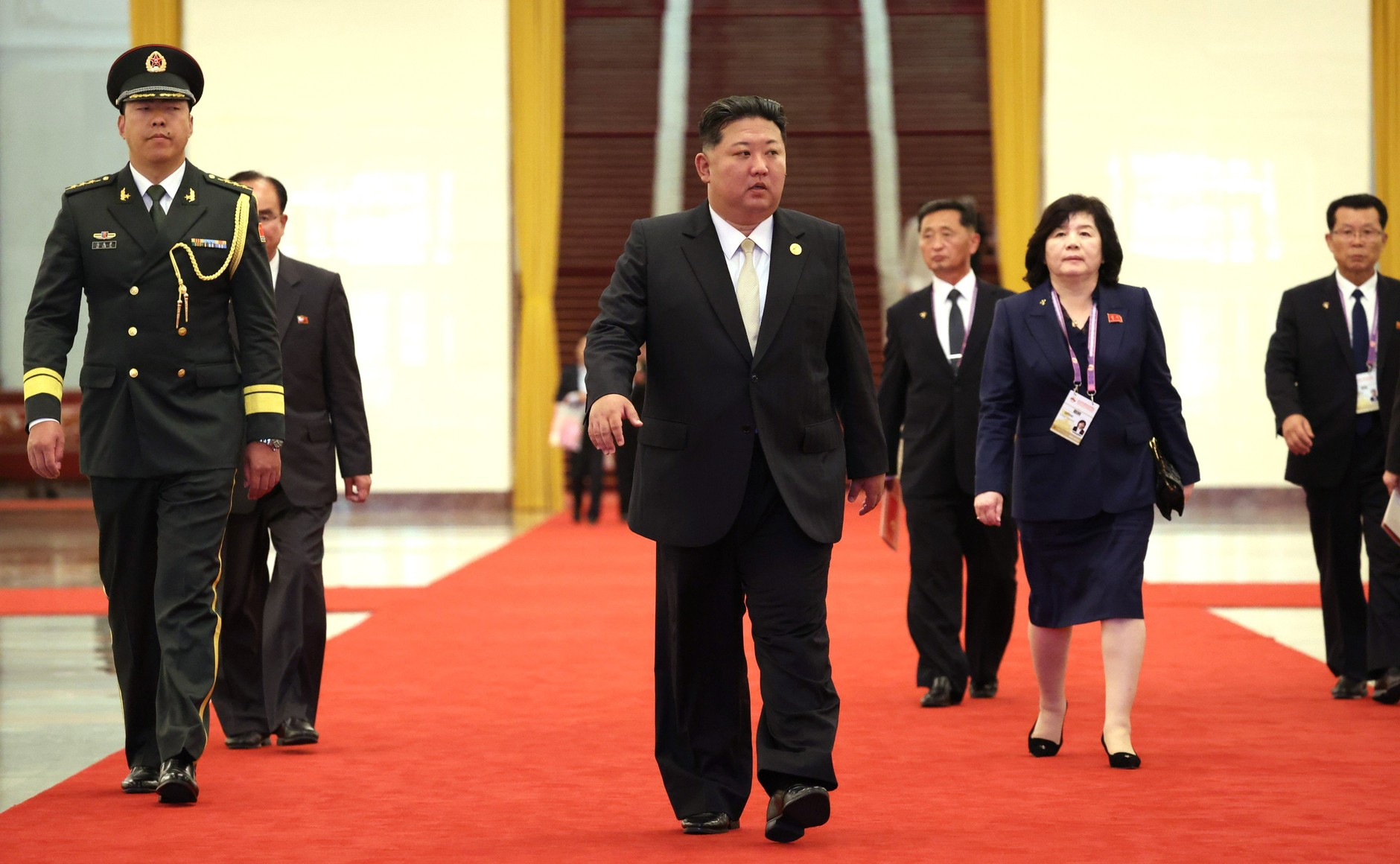
North Korean leader Kim Jong Un in Beijing, 3 September 2025

While waiting to watch the parade at the Tiananmen Gate Tower, South Korean National Assembly Speaker Woo Won-shik met with North Korean leader Kim Jong Un and the two shook hands and had a brief conversation. According to Woo's entourage, Woo said "We met again after 7 years" (referring to the 2018 inter-Korean summit) and Kim replied with the single word "yes". Woo also met with Putin and Putin asked Woo if there is any message he can relay to Kim, with Woo responding by saying that it is important to build peace in the Korean Peninsula despite difficulties.

=== Detention for criticism ===
On the day of the parade, in a WeChat group called "Huaibei Cadillac Car Club" with 496 members, a user shared a live broadcast link for the parade at 9 a.m. At 9:28, another user criticized it, saying "What era is this, still doing this kind of bullshit?" 3 hours later, this user was arrested by Shanghai police and given a 10-day administrative detention.

In a separate incident on the same day, the official Weibo account of the Xiangyang internet police announced that a 47-year-old man surnamed Meng from Hubei was detained. The man had forwarded the parade live broadcast on his WeChat Moments and added comments that "slandered and defamed" the commemoration, insulted and mocked other users who expressed patriotic sentiments, and had spread rumors.

== Reactions ==
=== China ===
NBC News described the domestic public enthusiasm for the parade as "palpable". Trends related to the parade included military themed haircuts. Chinese authorities widely censored and even arrested those who criticized the parade. Days prior to the parade, the 2025 Chongqing anti-CCP protest took place.

=== European Union ===
High Representative of the Union for Foreign Affairs and Security Policy Kaja Kallas states that the presence of Russian, North Korean and Iran (CRINK) leaders at the military parade represents "a direct effort to challenge the rules-based international order by establishing an anti-Western coalition."

=== North Korea ===
After the parade, the Korean Central Television (KCTV) aired a 50-minute documentary about Kim Jong Un's and his daughter Kim Ju Ae's visit. The documentary revealed that Kim stayed in the North Korean Embassy in Beijing. The documentary also showcased Kim's meetings with Putin and Xi. Notably, the documentary aired significant airtime to China's military and advanced weaponry, which the NK News said "was likely the first time most North Koreans would have been given such a detailed look at China's growing military power". The documentary noted that after the parade, Kim expressed his positive impression of "China's modern People's Liberation Army with Xi Jinping at the center."

=== Japan ===
As reported in Kyodo News, Japan had urged European and Asian leaders to not attend the parade, citing that the event "excessively exhibits anti-Japanese sentiment and seeks China's interpretation of the war to spread." The Chinese Ministry of Foreign Affairs in return lodged a protest against Japan. Chief Cabinet Secretary Hayashi Yoshimasa declined to comment on whether Japan had called on any nations not to attend. Speculations against Japan's diplomacy pressure raised when a Victory Day event hosted by the Chinese Consulate to Australia in Australian Parliament House was forced to change the venue, however, informants from the Australian government dismissed the claim.

Kiichirō Hatoyama of the Democratic Party For the People, the son of former Prime Minister Yukio Hatoyama, expressed his opposition towards his father's attendance in the parade, while party leader Yuichiro Tamaki similarly expressed his opposition towards Yukio's attendance and said that facing history seriously and being used by a foreign power are "two different things."

=== Taiwan ===
In Taiwan, the Mainland Affairs Council (MAC) imposed a ban on specific groups of persons to attend the parade, and called for members of public to refrain from the parade, any actions regarding to "collaboration with Mainland authorities" will face heavy fines, stripping of pension and honors. Several celebrities were reported to have been investigated by the MAC for reposting information about the parade.

Taiwan criticized the parade celebrations in China as historical revisionism, stating that the CCP "attempted to steal credit for leading the fight during the war" and pointing out that "most of the combat forces were made up from the forces of the Republic of China." China replied stating that Taiwan's criticism was "blaspheming those who died on behalf of the entire Chinese nation." China's Taiwan Affairs Office spokesperson Zhu Fenglian went on to say that Taiwan "should not and cannot be absent from the relevant commemoration activities" and dismiss the attempt by Taiwan as "despicable acts that betrays history and the nation." The Mainland Affairs Council of Taiwan criticized the parade's cost, with deputy minister Shen Yu-chung stating that China was "willing to spend NT$150 billion on the event while neglecting its domestic economic, labor, and social issues." Shen also said that "the commemoration in China is a great irony considering how China's actions speaks equivalently to fascism masquerading as nationalism."

Kuomintang chairman Eric Chu states that cross-straits visits must comply with the laws passed after hearing that former chairwoman Hung Hsiu-chu would attend the military parade.

=== Russia and Ukraine ===
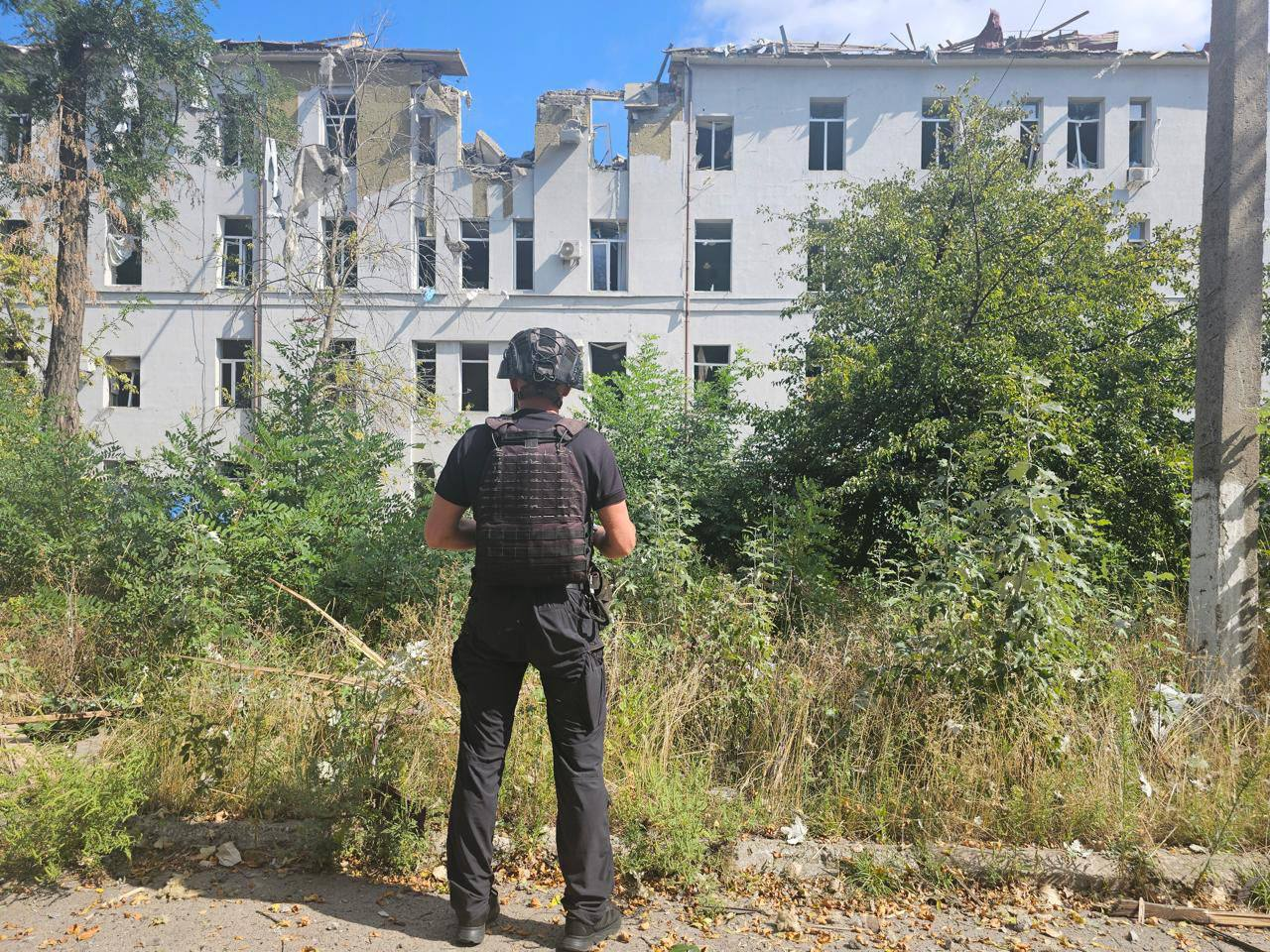
Hospital in Kostiantynivka, Ukraine after the Russian attack on 4 September 2025

As the parade occurred, Russia had fired more than 500 drones and two dozen missiles at Ukraine overnight, targeting mostly western and central Ukraine and wounding at least five people. Later that day, Putin said that his country is "willing to fight to achieve all its objectives if Ukraine does not agree to a peace deal" while Trump had persuaded Putin to meet Ukrainian president Volodymyr Zelenskyy.

=== United States ===
On his social media platform Truth Social, President of the United States Donald Trump stated, "Please give my warmest regards to Vladimir Putin and Kim Jong Un, as you conspire against the United States of America." Trump also reaffirmed his "very good relationship" with Xi Jinping and he did not see the military parade event as a "challenge to the United States." He also questioned whether Xi recognizes the "massive amount of support and blood" the United States has given to defend China's freedom.

The American Institute in Taiwan stated that the PRC used to parade to distort World War II history concerning documents such as the 1943 Cairo Declaration, Potsdam Declaration, and Treaty of San Francisco in order to promote Chinese unification.

=== India ===
An Indian government official told Jiji Press that despite the schedule convenience, Indian Prime Minister Narendra Modi does not attend the 3 September Victory Parade as the parade itself is "a commemoration of China defeating Japan" and "India has no intention to harm Japan" as concerns mounted over the fate of the Quadrilateral Security Dialogue after India's worsening ties with the United States.

=== Indonesia ===
President Prabowo Subianto's decision to attend the parade after initially cancelled his invitation due to the August 2025 Indonesian protests sparked international headlines as protests still rages on despite cooling down. Minister of the State Secretariat Prasetyo Hadi explained that Prabowo had received reports on the demonstration that public life has gradually returned to normal, hence the decision made to resume his invitation.

Leader of the Fourth Commission of the House of Representatives of Indonesia and Prabowo's former wife Titiek Suharto posted a picture of Prabowo together with Xi Jinping, Vladimir Putin and Kim Jong Un in admiration, stating that as an Indonesian, she is proud to see her president stand together with "World Tigers".

Similarly, Indonesian netizens in Twitter reacted to an editorial of Yomiuri Shimbun that shows a similar photo which cropped Prabowo out. Some of the reactions include mocking Prabowo and his voters while comparing him to the three leaders standing beside him. However, Yomiuri's editorial focuses on the three leaders and only mentioned Prabowo at the end of the article as Yomiuri viewed that Indonesia is a democracy unlike China, Russia and North Korea, justifying its different treatment.

=== Philippines ===
Secretary of National Defense Gilbert Teodoro states that the presence of China, North Korea and Russian leaders standing side by side in the parade is a form of intimidation against smaller countries. He also condemn the three leaders for not abiding to international law. Teodoro also condemned Xi's speech as an attempt of historical revisionism in their expansionist narrative. A spokesperson from the Chinese Embassy in the Philippines condemned Teodoro's statement as anti-Chinese and Teodoro's remarks revealed his arrogance and lack of understanding of historical facts.

== See also ==
- 2025 Tianjin SCO summit
- 2025 Moscow Victory Day Parade
- 70th Anniversary of Chinese People's Volunteers' Participation in War to Resist US Aggression and Aid Korea
- 2015 China Victory Day Parade
- CRINK
