= Chen Juewan =

Chinese educator and politician (1932–2022)

- 陈觉万

President of Huaqiao University
- In office August 1988 – August 1993
- Preceded by: Ye Fei
- Succeeded by: Zhuang Shanyu

Personal details
- Born: 5 April 1932 Surabaya, Java, Dutch East Indies
- Died: 7 October 2022 (aged 90) Quanzhou, Fujian, China
- Party: Chinese Communist Party
- Education: Jilin University

Chinese name
- Simplified Chinese: 陈觉万
- Traditional Chinese: 陳覺萬
Transcriptions
Standard Mandarin
- Hanyu Pinyin: Chén Juéwàn

Chen Juewan (Chinese: 陈觉万; 5 April 1932 – 7 October 2022) was a Chinese educator and politician who served as president of Huaqiao University from 1988 to 1993. He was a delegate to the 7th National People's Congress and a member of the 8th National Committee of the Chinese People's Political Consultative Conference.

== Biography ==
Chen was born in Surabaya, Java, Dutch East Indies (now Indonesia), on 5 April 1932, to Chen Mingjin (陈明津), a Chinese educator who mainly worked in Surabaya, and Lin Shuyun (林淑芸), a Chinese teacher. Chen ancestral home is in Anxi County, Fujian. He returned to China in 1948 and attended Anxi County High School, and soon was admitted to Haijiang College two years later. In 1950, he entered Jilin University, and worked there after graduation, where he was promoted to associate professor in 1979 and to full professor in 1985. He joined the Chinese Communist Party in July 1982. He was named a vice-president of Huaqiao University in October 1985. He moved up the ranks to become executive vice president in September 1986 and president in August 1988. He became president of Liming Vocational University in March 1994, and served until October 1995. He retired in January 1998.

On 7 October 2022, he died from an illness in Quanzhou, Fujian, at the age of 90.

Educational offices
| Preceded by Ye Fei | President of Huaqiao University; 1988–1993 | Succeeded by Zhuang Shanyu |
