= Chang Li-chi =

Taiwanese-born researcher in China (born 1984)

- 張立齊
- Born: 1984 (age 41–42); Fengyuan, Taichung, Taiwan
- Education: Peking University
- Occupations: Postdoctorate, Huaqiao University
- Known for: First Taiwanese to lose household registration in Taiwan for holding a mainland settlement certificate
- Political party: Chinese Communist Party

Chang Li-chi (born 1984) is an educator from Taichung County, Taiwan, who works in China. As of 2026, he is a postdoctoral researcher at the School of International Studies, Huaqiao University. In June 2025, the Taiwanese authorities ruled that he had lost his household registration in Taiwan and his status as a Taiwanese resident, because he had received a settlement certificate (定居證) for Taiwan residents in mainland China.

== Biography ==
Chang was born into a family of doctors in Fengyuan Township, Taichung County. When he was in junior high, the 1999 Jiji earthquake left his family short of money, and he left school for a while to work and help them. In high school, he lived through the first change of ruling party in Taiwan and the political tension it caused at his school.

In 2005, he began studying automation engineering at Far East University, where he first learned about Marxism. After graduating in 2008, he went on a study tour to mainland China. That year he also started a master's degree at the Graduate Institute of Mainland China Studies at National Quemoy University, where he studied under Professor Gao Hui. His research looked at how power shifted inside the Chinese Communist Party (CCP) during the Long March. While studying, he visited Xiamen University to ask about joining the CCP.

In 2013, he began a doctorate at the School of International Studies at Peking University. He later walked the route of the Red Army's Long March. After the university's CCP branch reviewed him, he was accepted as a party member. During his doctorate, he spent time as a volunteer teacher in Inner Mongolia.

After finishing his doctorate in 2017, he worked as an economic and social researcher at the National Academy of Science and Technology Innovation, mainly on Taiwan.

In 2022, he moved to Xiamen, started a business and set up a WeChat account called "Cross-Strait in the Same Boat".

In September 2025, he was invited to attend the Victory Day Parade in Beijing. In October, he took part in an event held by the All-China Federation of Taiwan Compatriots to mark 80 years since the Retrocession of Taiwan.

== Loss of Taiwanese status ==
On January 1, 2024, Chang received a residence document for Taiwan residents in Fujian. He was one of the first people to get one under a new system, and Chinese state media reported on it. At the time, Taiwan's Mainland Affairs Council (MAC) said that getting this document did not mean registering a household in mainland China. Because of this, he did not lose his Taiwanese status under the rules on relations with the mainland. He never registered a household in the mainland, and the document ran out after six months.

On April 16, 2025, the MAC changed its view and said that holding this kind of document counts the same as having a household registration in the mainland. Under Taiwanese law, this kind of ruling can apply to past cases. Using the new rule, the MAC announced in June 2025 that Chang had lost his Taiwanese status. Chang appealed the decision and also took it to court. A spokesperson for China's Taiwan Affairs Office said the document is not a mainland household registration. The spokesperson said the Lai Ching-te government's move hurt the "rights and interests" of Taiwanese people.

== Personal life ==
At Far East University, Chang studied alongside Li Tung-hsien, a Taiwanese taekwondo athlete. Together they started the university's taekwondo club and ran a secret Marxist reading group.

== Works ==
- Chang, Li-chi (2011). "An Empirical Analysis of Power Shift in CCP Central Committee (1934-1936)"
- Chang, Li-chi (2017). "Why I want to join the Chinese Communist Party." Straits Review Monthly, (324), p. 43–45
