= World Anti-Fascist War =

Chinese Communist Party slogan

- Simplified Chinese: 世界反法西斯战争
- Traditional Chinese: 世界反法西斯戰爭
- Literal meaning: World Anti-Fascist War
Transcriptions
Standard Mandarin
- Hanyu Pinyin: Shìjiè Fǎn Fàxīsī Zhànzhēng
Yue: Cantonese
- Jyutping: sai3 gaai3 faan2 faat3 sai1 si1 zin3 zang1

The World Anti-Fascist War (Chinese: 世界反法西斯战争; pinyin: Shìjiè Fǎn Fàxīsī Zhànzhēng) is a term used by the Chinese Communist Party (CCP) and the government of China to refer to a global conflict that includes the Second Sino-Japanese War and World War II. Chinese embassies have occasionally encompassed further conflicts, such as the Spanish Civil War, with the term.

Used before the end of World War II in Asia by CCP chairman Mao Zedong, the term gained further prominence under CCP general secretary Xi Jinping, who in 2015 began the Chinese government's current interpretation regarding a 1931 start date for the Second Sino-Japanese War with the Japanese invasion of Manchuria following the Mukden incident.

In 2015, the Embassy of China, Addis Ababa used the term while reporting a commemoration for Ethiopian victory in the 1940–1941 East African campaign, following the 1935–1937 Second Italo-Ethiopian War: "In 1935, Italian fascism invaded Ethiopia. After six years of arduous resistance, the Ethiopian military and civilians finally achieved victory ... on the Ethiopian battlefield in the anti-fascist war."

A 2025 article by the Embassy of China, Madrid used the term in highlighting Chinese members of the International Brigades of the 1936–1939 Spanish Civil War, writing "The stories of Chinese volunteers enrich the narrative of the World Anti-Fascist War".

== Origins ==
The cover of a 1947 book titled "Preliminary Compilation of Documents on the World Anti-Fascist War" (Note: Chinese: 世界反法西斯戰爭文獻初篇; pinyin: Shìjiè fǎn fàxīsī zhànzhēng wénxiàn chū piān)

Mao Zedong gave the opening speech at the CCP's 7th National Congress on 23 April 1945:

The times are very favourable. In Europe, Hitler will soon be overthrown. The chief theatre of the world anti-fascist war is in the West, where the fighting will soon end in victory, thanks to the efforts of the Soviet Red Army. The guns of the Red Army can already be heard in Berlin, which will probably fail before long. In the East, too, victory in the war to overthrow Japanese imperialism is nigh. Our congress is meeting on the eve of final victory in the anti-fascist war.

In September 1949, Belgian Resistance member and Trotskyist activist Ernest Mandel wrote an article "Purge of Soviet Culture", criticizing the term in a broader trend of Russian nationalism and Soviet patriotism in World War II.

By tying patriotism to the line of the “world anti-fascist war” and “unity of the great allies,” the People’s Front vocabulary was introduced in the USSR itself for the first time in the history of Stalinism.

CCP general secretary Jiang Zemin used the term in a speech at the UN's 2000 Millennium Summit: "the United Nations came into being at the historic moment of the great victory in the world's anti-fascist war". Ministry of Foreign Affairs spokesperson Hong Lei stated during the 2012 anti-Japanese demonstrations in China that "These actions express the Chinese people's ... profound dissatisfaction with Japan's challenge to the achievements of the World Anti-Fascist War and the post-war international order."

== Use since 2015 ==
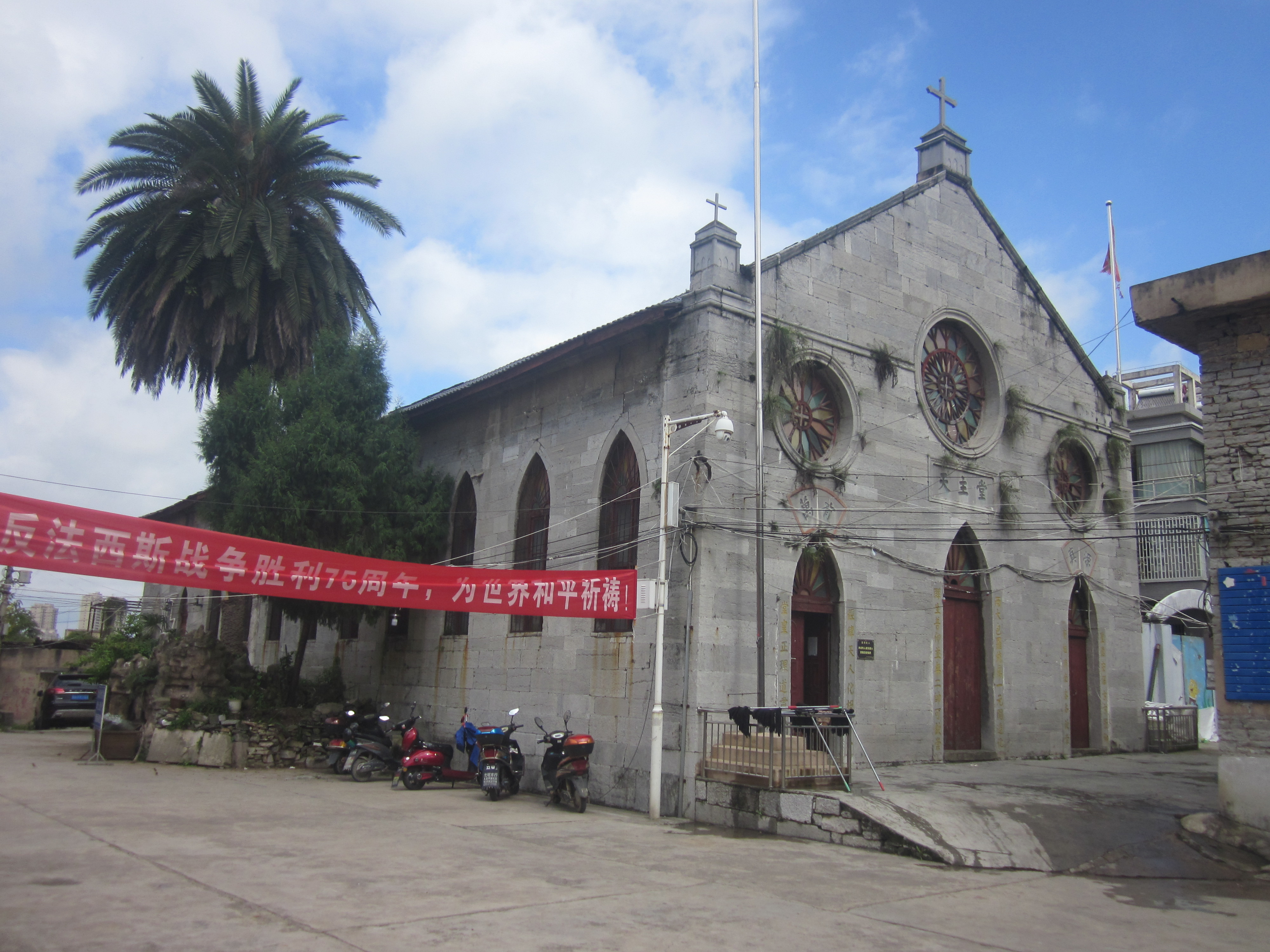
A banner next to a Catholic church in Zhenning Buyei and Miao Autonomous County, Guizhou, reading "On the 75th anniversary of the victory in the anti-fascist war, we pray for world peace." (Note: Chinese: 反法西斯战争胜利75周年,为世界和平祈祷; pinyin: Fǎn fàxīsī zhànzhēng shènglì 75 zhōunián, wèi shìjiè hépíng qídǎo)

The term gained prominence and a redefinition of the start date of the Second Sino-Japanese War during the 70th anniversary of the end of World War II. Chinese academics noted a 2015 speech by CCP general secretary Xi Jinping that "first put forward the concept of a 14-year war of resistance" from the 1931 Japanese invasion of Manchuria and subsequent insurgency, in contrast to the traditional historical narrative in China of the eight-year "War of Resistance against Japanese Aggression", the Chinese term for the Second Sino-Japanese War. In January 2017, China's Ministry of Education required textbooks to use the name "14-year War of Resistance against Japanese aggression" and the 1931 start date.

Swinburne University of Technology researcher John Fitzgerald identified the term as an exclusively driven by state usage, charting that not a single academic article between 1980 and 2015 used the phrase outside of five-year peaks in anniversaries for the end of World War II. Fitzgerald analyzed Mao's original usage to both "signal allegiance to Stalin" and "reduce Japan’s total war in China to a local site of world communism’s global war with capitalism". Fitzgerald also argued the term is part of the Chinese government's manipulation of national anti-Japanese sentiment, to portray the United States as blocking a "just retribution against Japan".

A 2025 BBC Monitoring report explained the term as part of China's broader narrative on World War II, that cast China and Russia as the primary creators and defenders of the postwar order, while ignoring Russia's invasion of Ukraine, as well as the Molotov–Ribbentrop Pact and the role of the Nationalist government in fighting the Japanese colonial empire.

== Use outside China ==
Australian Labor Party senator Sam Dastyari drew controversy for using the term in a 2015 interview with Chinese state media. Dastyari resigned in 2018 amid a scandal over donations from Chinese companies.

== See also ==
- Great Patriotic War (term)
- Anti-Comintern Pact
- Propaganda in China
- Historical revisionism
- 2005 anti-Japanese demonstrations
- 2012 anti-Japanese demonstrations in China
- 2015 China Victory Day Parade
- 2025 China Victory Day Parade
- Japanese war crimes § Historical negationism and denialism in Japan
- Category:Works about the Second Sino-Japanese War
