= The People's Army is Loyal to the Party =

The People's Army is Loyal to the Party (Chinese: 人民军队忠于党) is a patriotic song composed by Zhang Yongmei and set to lyrics by Xiao Min.

It celebrates the role of the Chinese Communist Party and its founder Mao Zedong in the process of the founding and development of the Chinese Communist Party and the People's Liberation Army.
