= 2018 inter-Korean summit =

2018 inter-Korean summit may refer to:

- April 2018 inter-Korean summit
- May 2018 inter-Korean summit
- September 2018 inter-Korean summit

== See also ==
- Inter-Korean summits
- 2018–19 Korean peace process
