= I Love the Motherland's Blue Skies =

Chinese song

"I Love the Motherland's Blue Skies" (Chinese: 我爱祖国的蓝天) is a song sung by members of the People's Liberation Army Air Force of China. It was used to encourage members of the air force to fight for the homeland. It was written by the composer Yang Ming (羊鸣) and the lyrics were written by Yan Su.

== Lyrics ==
Simplified Chinese Lyrics	Literal English Translation	English Meaning Translation
我爱祖国的蓝天，晴空万里，阳光灿烂， 白云为我铺大道，东风送我飞向前。 金色的朝霞在我身边飞舞，脚下是一片锦绣河山。 啊！啊！水兵爱大海，骑兵爱草原， 要问飞行员爱什么？ 我爱祖国的蓝天。 我爱祖国的蓝天，云海茫茫一望无边， 春雷为我敲战鼓，红日照我把敌歼。 美丽的长虹搭起彩门，迎接着战鹰胜利凯旋 （原词：毛泽东思想指引着我们，人民空军勇往直前）。 啊！啊！水兵爱大海，骑兵爱草原， 要问飞行员爱什么？ 我爱祖国的蓝天。 美丽的长虹搭起彩门，迎接着雄鹰胜利凯旋（原词：毛泽东思想指引着我们，人民空军勇往直前）。 水兵爱大海，骑兵爱草原， 要问飞行员爱什么？ 我爱祖国的蓝天。	I love the motherland's blue skies, clear for thousands of kilometers, with a bright sun, The white clouds give me a boulevard, the eastern wind helps me fly forward. The golden dawn dances around me, below my feet are beautiful rivers and mountains. The navy loves the ocean and the army loves the land. If you want to know what pilots love, I love the motherland's blue skies. I love the motherland's blue skies, with an ocean of clouds and at one look there is no end. The spring thunder plays the war drums for me, the red sun lights me to annihilate the enemy. The beautiful rainbow builds up a colorful entrance, passing the brave eagles. (Originally: Mao Zedong's thoughts guide us, the people's air force bravely forward.) The navy loves the ocean, and the army loves the land. If you want to know what pilots love, I love the motherland's blue skies.	I love the motherland's blue skies. The clearness stretches over a very long distance, with a bright sun. The white clouds ahead of me are like a road in the sky. The wind in the east helps me fly forward. The golden dawn I am flying in is very beautiful and below me are great rivers and mountains. The navy loves the ocean and the army loves the land. If you ever want to know what pilots love, I love the motherland's blue skies. I love the motherland's blue skies. The clouds are like an ocean and the sky seems endless. Spring thunder is like someone playing war drums for me. The red sun lights the sky up to annihilate the enemy. The beautiful rainbows seem to be colorful entrances, for us brave eagles. (Originally: Mao Zedong's thoughts guide us, the people's air force, bravely forward.) The navy loves the ocean and the army loves the land. If you ever want to know what pilots love, I love the motherland's blue skies.

== Use ==
This song was used on the 60th anniversary of the founding of The People's Republic of China.
