= Huaqiao University =

National university in Fujian province, China

Coordinates: 25.142798°N 118.644104°E

- 华侨大学
- Motto: 会通中外 并育德才
- Type: Public
- Established: 1960; 66 years ago
- Parent institution: United Front Work Department
- President: Xu Xipeng (徐西鹏)
- Faculty: 1,700
- Students: 24,000
- Location: Quanzhou and Xiamen, Fujian, People's Republic of China
- Campus: Quanzhou campus 740,000 m^{2} Xiamen campus 1,320,000 m^{2}
- Website: www.hqu.edu.cn

Chinese name
- Simplified Chinese: 华侨大学
- Traditional Chinese: 華僑大學
Transcriptions
Standard Mandarin
- Hanyu Pinyin: Huáqiáo Dàxué
Southern Min
- Hokkien POJ: Hôa-kiâu Tāi-ha̍k

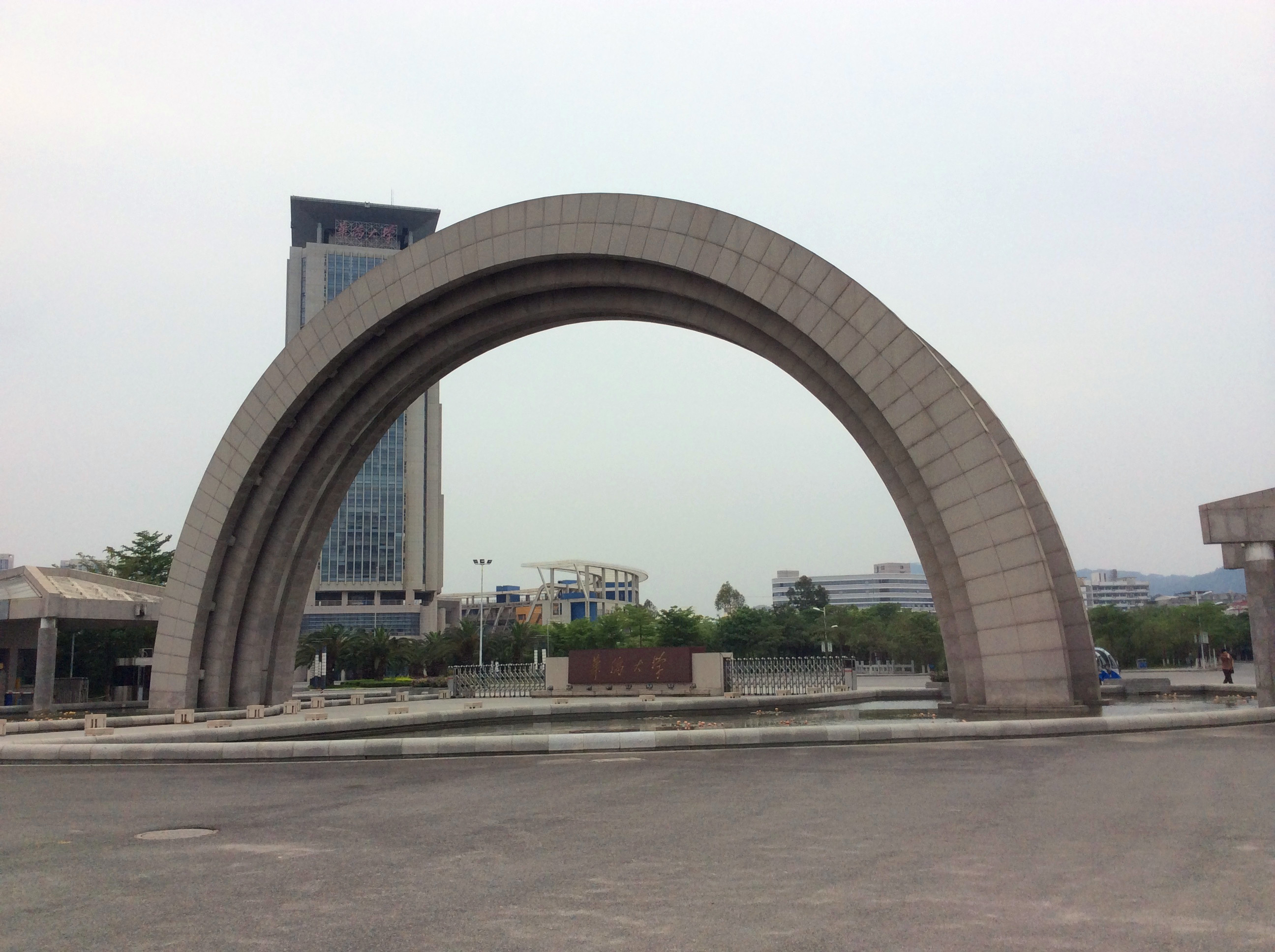
Huaqiao University Xiamen Campus

Huaqiao University (HQU) is a public university in Xiamen and Quanzhou, Fujian, China. It is directly under the United Front Work Department of the Chinese Communist Party (CCP).

Huaqiao University was founded in 1960, with support from the late Chinese premier and historical figure Zhou Enlai, for students of overseas Chinese backgrounds (Hong Kong, Taiwan, Macau, Malaysia, Singapore) to pursue tertiary education in their ancestral homelands. The university has two campuses in the cities of Xiamen and Quanzhou, known for their large numbers of overseas Chinese students who have roots in these cities.

== University History ==
Since its founding, the university has graduated more than 76,000 students, of which 36,000 are from overseas. The university has 28,000 full-time on-campus students, including 3,000 overseas students from 29 countries and regions including Taiwan, Hong Kong, Macau, Malaysia, the Philippines, Indonesia, Thailand, Japan, the United States, and Argentina.

== Infrastructure ==
=== Quanzhou Campus ===
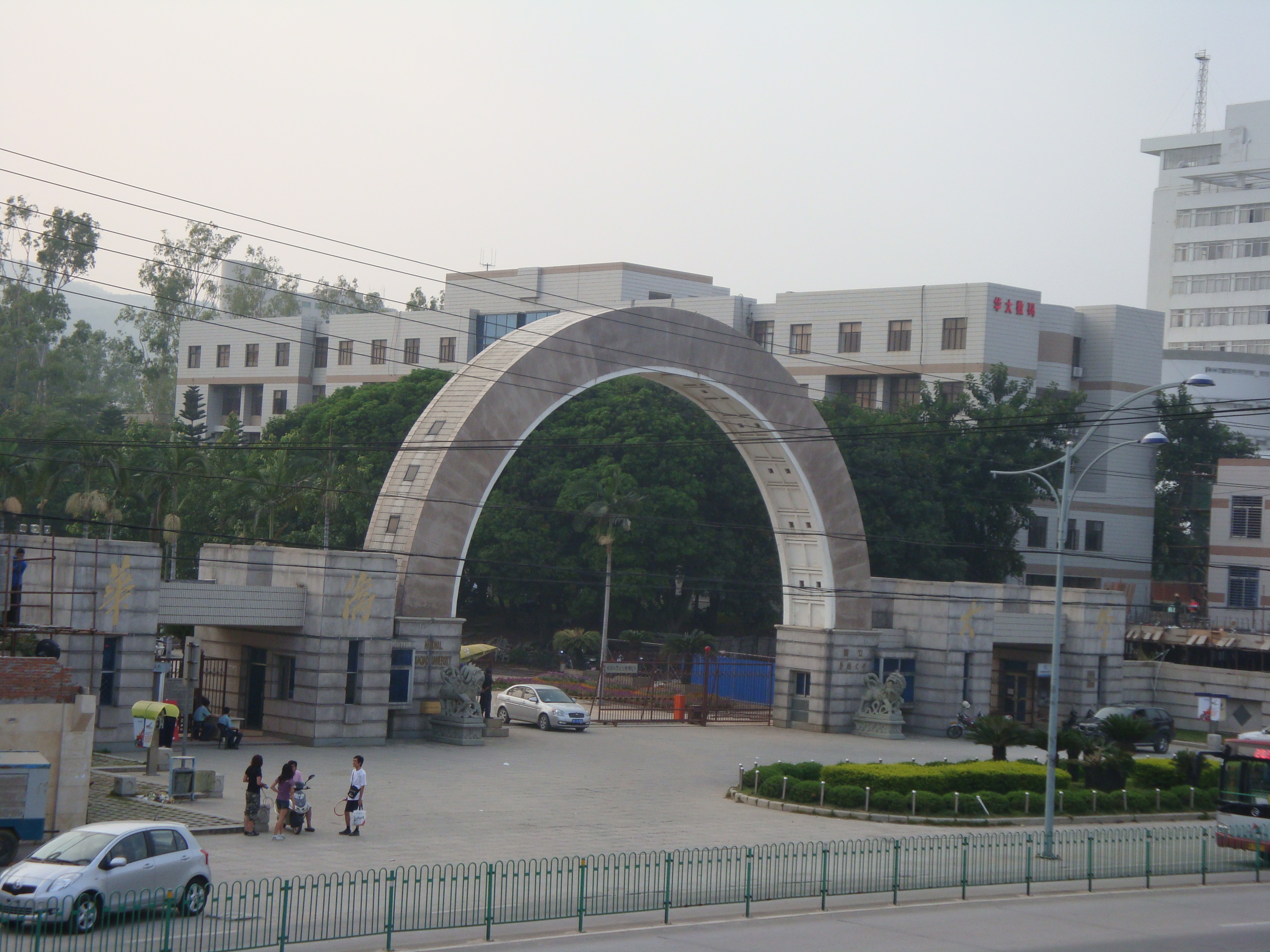
Gate of Huaqiao University Quanzhou Campus

The main campus covers an area of 740,000 m^{2} with a total floor space of 550,000 m^{2}.

=== Xiamen Campus ===
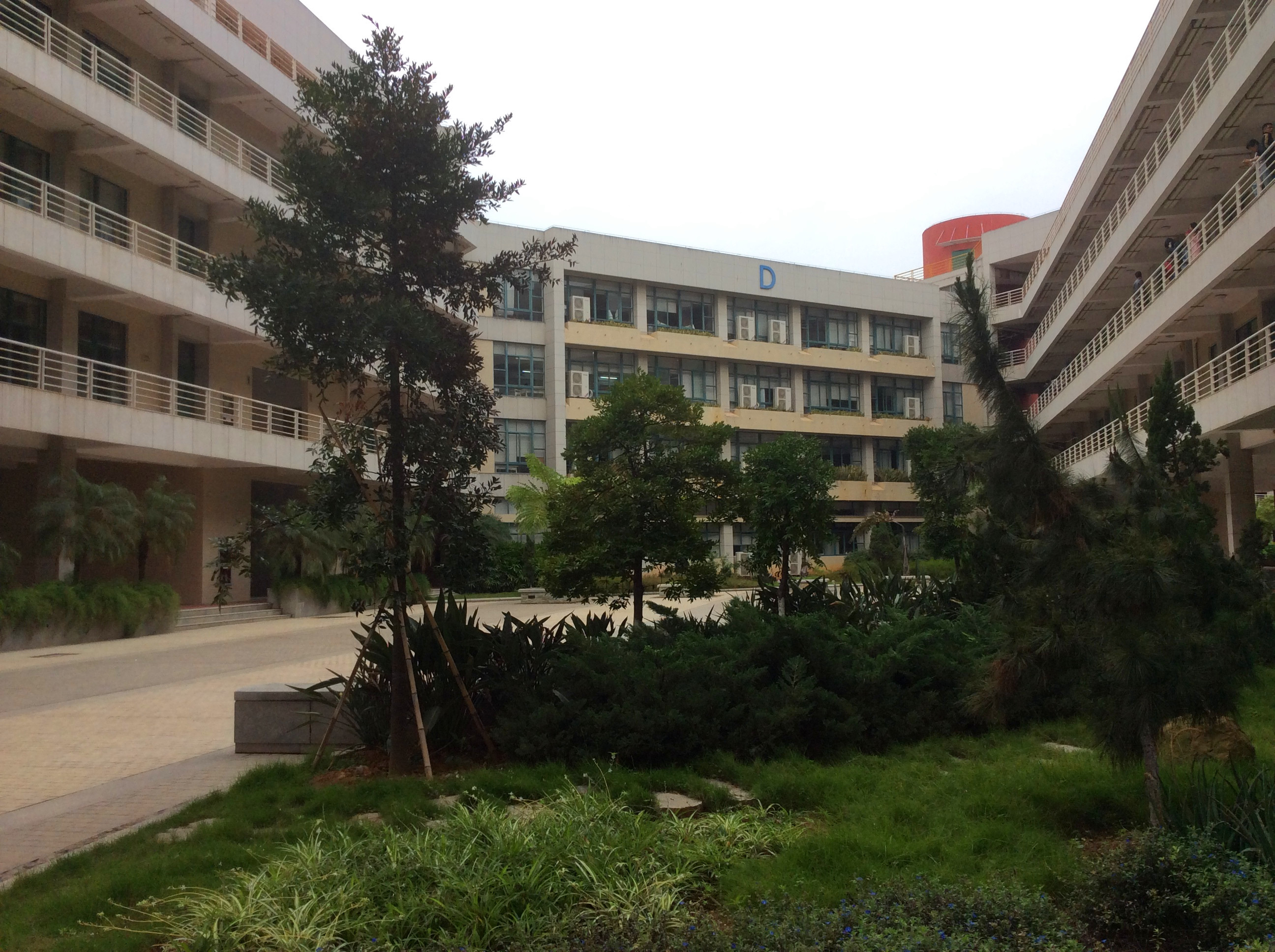
The Building of Teaching in Huaqiao University Xiamen Campus

The new campus in Xiamen covers 1,320,000 m^{2}. The library has a total collection of 2,040,000 volumes of 1,030,000 titles.

=== Chinese Language and Culture College ===
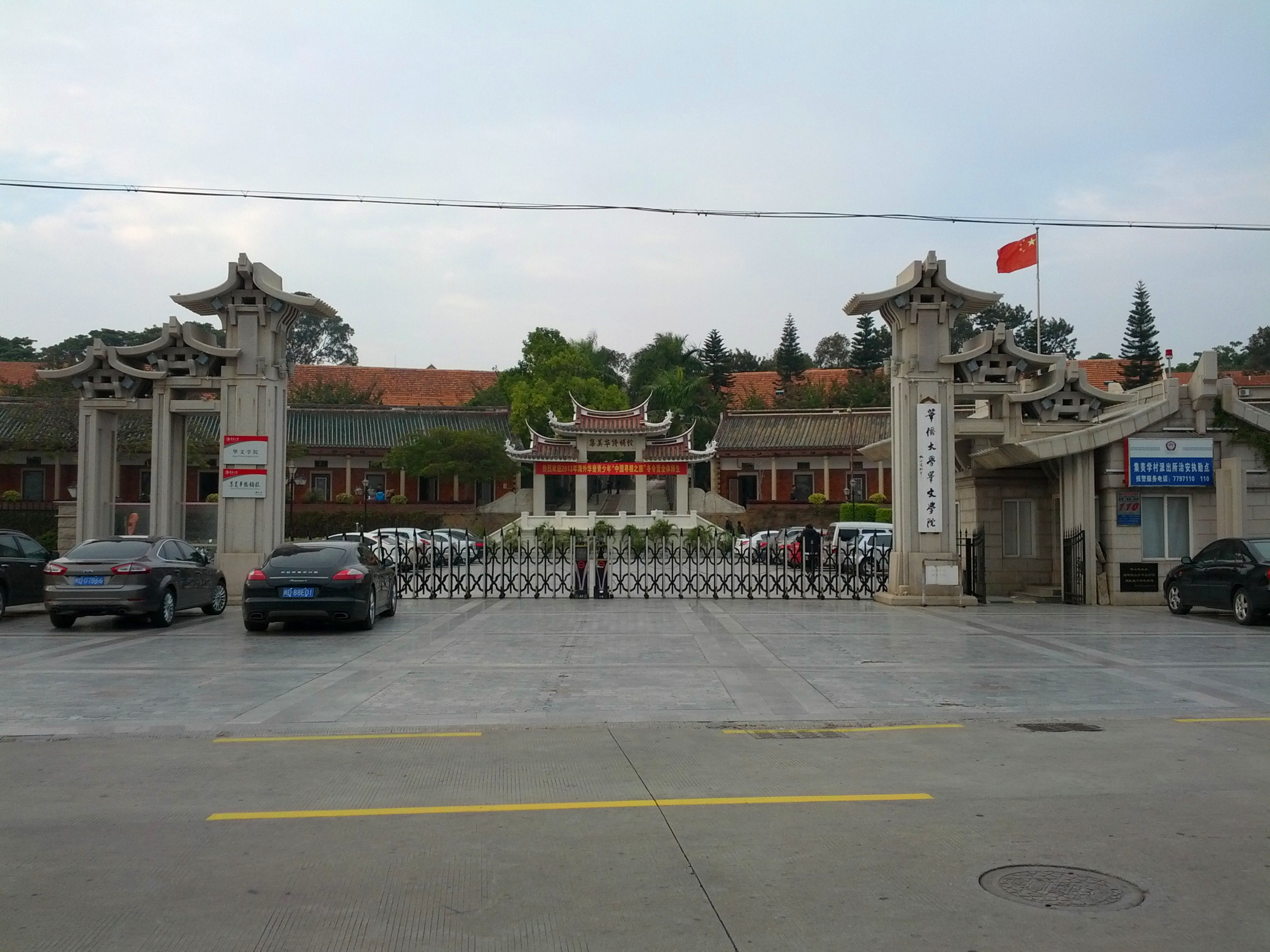
Chinese Language and Culture College, Huaqiao University

Chinese Language and Culture College is subordinate to Huaqiao University, which used to be Remedial School of Jimei's overseas students (Jimei Chinese Language School), a special school to provide overseas students with Chinese language and cultural knowledge. There are already 320,000 graduates from over 30 countries and areas. Chinese Language and Culture College is the base of the national Chinese education, and the only place for HSK in Fujian Province instituted by the nation's HSK committee. The College offers a short-term Chinese study course, a training course for Chinese teachers, summer and winter camps for overseas students, a symposium of Chinese culture, and a preparatory course for the overseas Chinese students from Hong Kong, Macau, and Taiwan. It currently has more than 700 postgraduates.

== Faculty ==
The university has more than 1,700 faculty members, with over 500 holding senior professional titles. There are 900 full-time teachers, 400 professors and associate professors, over 141 PhD holders, and 38 government funded researchers.

== Faculties and departments ==
The university comprises 19 colleges or departments of science, engineering, economics, management, law, liberal arts, philosophy, and history. It offers 9 PhD programs, 64 masters programs, 6 engineering masters programs, and 52 undergraduate programs, with 12 provincial or ministerial key disciplines.

=== List of faculty ===
- Chang Li-chi (b. 1984), researcher at the School of International Studies.

== Courses ==
Since 1997, the university has enrolled a total of 216 postgraduates from Macau, who pursued such fields as economy, enterprise management, computer science and philosophy. The university has also offered master's degrees to a total of 30 students from Macau in 2002.

== Rankings ==
In 2020, the Academic Ranking of World Universities ranked Huaqiao University within the 901-1000 band globally.

University rankings

Global – Overall
- ARWU World: 901-1000 (2020)
