= 70th Anniversary of Chinese People's Volunteers' Participation in War to Resist US Aggression and Aid Korea =

2020 Chinese Communist Party event

Conference to commemorate the 70th anniversary of the Chinese People's Volunteers' participation in the War to Resist US Aggression and Aid Korea 纪念中国人民志愿军抗美援朝出国作战70周年大会
- Date: 23 October 2020
- Locations: Great Hall of the People, Beijing
- Coordinates: 39°54′12″N 116°23′15″E
- Country: China
- Previous event: 60th anniversary of the Chinese People's Volunteers' participation in the War to Resist US Aggression and Aid Korea
- General Secretary of the CCP: Xi Jinping (Note: CCP General Secretary Xi Jinping has also served as Chairman of the CCP Central Military Commission, the supreme commander of the armed forces since 2012.)
- People: Premier Li Keqiang (host)

The 70th Anniversary of the Chinese People's Volunteers' War to Resist US Aggression and Aid Korea was a commemorative meeting held by the Central Committee of the Chinese Communist Party and State Council at the Great Hall of the People in Beijing on 23 October 2020, to commemorate the People's Republic of China's entry to the Korean War.

== Background ==
The Chinese Communist Party (CCP) held commemorative activities around 25 October because the War to Resist US Aggression and Aid Korea as defined by China began on 25 October 1950, the day when the Chinese People's Volunteers (CPV) entered North Korea on 19 October of that year for the first time, rather than the Korean War as generally said to have begun on 25 June 1950. The Chinese government calls the war that broke out on the Korean Peninsula on 25 June 1950, the Korean Civil War and the subsequent war history after the Chinese People's Volunteers entered North Korea as the "War to Resist U.S. Aggression and Aid Korea".

== Meeting ==
=== Preparation ===
On 22 October 2020, the CCP Central Committee, the State Council, and the Central Military Commission awarded the 70th Anniversary of the Chinese People's Volunteer Army's Overseas Operations to Resist U.S. Aggression and Aid Korea commemorative medal to the surviving veterans of the Chinese People's Volunteer Army who participated in the Korean War. The commemorative medal is made of red copper plated with gold and silver, and the core part is the image of the volunteer soldier and 70 beams of light.

Before the commemorative meeting on 23 October, Xi Jinping, General Secretary of the CCP Central Committee, President of China, and Chairman of the Central Military Commission, met with representatives of the recipients of the 70th Anniversary of the Chinese People’s Volunteer Army’s Overseas Operations to Resist U.S. Aggression and Aid Korea commemorative medal and took photos with them.

=== Speech ===
At 10:00 on 23 October 2020, the meeting to commemorate the 70th anniversary of the Chinese People's Volunteers' participation in the Korean War was held at the Great Hall of the People in Beijing. The meeting was chaired by Li Keqiang, member of the Politburo Standing Committee and Premier of the State Council. Xi Jinping, General Secretary of the CCP Central Committee, President of the State, and Chairman of the Central Military Commission, delivered a speech at the meeting. Li Zhanshu, Wang Yang, Wang Huning, Zhao Leji, Han Zheng, members of the Politburo Standing Committee, and Vice President Wang Qishan and other party and state leaders attended the meeting.

First, everyone stood up and sang the March of the Volunteers, and observed a moment of silence for the martyrs who fought in the War to Resist U.S. Aggression and Aid Korea. Afterwards, Xi Jinping delivered a speech in which he praised the People's Volunteer Army, which participated in the fight against the United States and its allies who invaded the Korean Peninsula in 1950. He also said, "Through this battle, the Chinese people crushed the invaders' plot to station troops at the border and strangle the new China in its cradle, and the new China has truly gained a firm foothold; the Chinese people have completely swept away the century-long humiliation of being at the mercy of others and relying on others since modern times, and have completely thrown away the hat of the sick man of East Asia. The Chinese people have truly raised their heads in pride; the Chinese people defeated the invaders, shocked the world, established the important position of the new China in Asian and international affairs, and demonstrated the new China's status as a great power."

In terms of the content and wording of the meeting, the media Deutsche Welle claimed that the CCP Central Committee's high-profile commemoration of the War to Resist U.S. Aggression and Aid Korea was aimed at the increasingly tense Sino-U.S. relations. The Deutsche Welle website also quoted Xi Jinping's speech: "In today's world, any unilateralism, protectionism, and extreme egoism will never work! Any form of blackmail, blockade, and extreme pressure will never work!" BBC Chinese website and Radio France International quoted analysts who argued that this was China's direct message to the United States.

Xi Jinping characterized the Korean War as a fight against imperialist aggression. The original words are: "On 25 June 1950, the Korean War broke out. Based on its global strategy and Cold War thinking, the U.S. government made the decision to intervene in the Korean War by force and sent the Seventh Fleet to invade the Taiwan Strait. In early October 1950, the U.S. military, despite repeated warnings from the Chinese government, brazenly crossed the 38th parallel and brought the war to the Sino-Korean border. The invading U.S. military aircraft bombed China's northeastern border areas many times, causing serious losses to people's lives and property, and China's security was facing serious threats. At this critical juncture, at the request of the North Korean Party and Government, the Chinese Party and Government made the historic decision to resist the U.S. aggression and aid Korea and defend the country with extraordinary courage and bravery. On 19 October 1950, the Chinese People's Volunteer Army entered the Korean battlefield under the leadership of Commander and Political Commissar Peng Dehuai. This was a just act by a just army....... After arduous and arduous battles, the Chinese and North Korean troops defeated their well-armed opponents, shattered the myth of the invincibility of the US military, and forced the arrogant invaders to sign the armistice agreement on 27 July 1953." After Xi Jinping finished his speech, everyone stood up and sang Ode to the Motherland together, and the meeting ended.

== Other memorials ==
On 22 October, the People's Bank of China issued a set of gold and silver commemorative coins to mark the 70th anniversary of the Chinese People's Volunteers’ participation in the Korean War. The set of commemorative coins consists of two coins, one gold commemorative coin and one silver commemorative coin, both of which are legal tender of the People's Republic of China.

On 26 October, Xi Jinping's speech at the meeting commemorating the 70th anniversary of the Chinese People's Volunteers’ participation in the War to Resist U.S. Aggression and Aid Korea was published by the People's Publishing House and distributed at Xinhua Bookstores on the same day.

== Broadcast ==
China Central Radio and Television and Xinhua News Agency broadcast the conference live on 23 October. People's Daily, China Central Television, China.com and other key central news websites and new media platforms such as the People's Daily client, Xinhua News Agency client, and CCTV News client also broadcast the conference simultaneously.

== Reactions ==
This conference was held ten years after the 2010 "Symposium to Commemorate the 60th Anniversary of the Chinese People's Volunteers' Participation in the War to Resist U.S. Aggression and Aid Korea". It was more grand in scale than the symposium ten years ago. The New York Times noted the high profile of this conference and said that in 1970, Mao Zedong downplayed the 20th anniversary conference in consideration of improving Sino-U.S. relations. After the U.S. bombing of the Chinese Embassy in Belgrade, CCP General Secretary Jiang Zemin presided over a high-profile conference to commemorate the 50th anniversary of the War to Resist U.S. Aggression and Aid Korea in 2000.

Xi Jinping mentioned at the conference: "China will never seek hegemony, and at the same time opposes any force that invades and splits the motherland's territory. The Chinese people will fight back head-on!" In response to this statement, Taiwan's Premier Su Tseng-chang said: "We never conflict with others, but our determination to defend our homeland must be very firm. We do not want war, but we also do not want to use war to threaten the people of Taiwan." In response to Su Tseng-chang's remarks, Zhu Fenglian, a spokesperson for the Taiwan Affairs Office of the State Council of the mainland, refuted: "Su Tseng-chang is accustomed to confusing right and wrong, deliberately provoking cross-strait confrontation, and intimidating the people of Taiwan. His intentions are sinister." The Central Committee of the Communist Youth League of China issued a statement in response to Su: "Are you worthy?"

U.S. State Department spokesperson Morgan Ortagus tweeted that the outbreak of the Korean War was due to the support of Chinese leader Mao Zedong's support for North Korea's invasion of South Korea, the counterattack of liberal countries, and the CCP sending a large number of troops to participate in the war. South Korean Foreign Minister Kang Kyung-wha also said that she conveyed South Korea's position to China and taking necessary measures. She quoted the UN Security Council resolution, saying that the Korean War was caused by North Korea's invasion of the south, and said that this was an undeniable historical fact that was also well known to the international community. During a national affairs review by the National Defense Committee of the South Korean National Assembly, the South Korean defense minister Suh Wook expressed his disagreement with Xi Jinping's statement, saying that "the Korean War was clearly a war of aggression against the South. It was a war in which (North Korea) invaded the South at the instigation of Stalin and Mao Zedong. The United Nations Army saved our country at a critical moment." This was the first time that a senior South Korean official made a statement regarding what South Korea believed to be China's distortion of historical facts. In response, Chinese Ambassador to South Korea Xing Haiming said that the War to Resist U.S. Aggression and Aid Korea referred to by Xi Jinping "defended international justice and world peace and protected the newly born People's Republic of China." Xing said that China has no intention of fighting a war with anyone and hopes that South Korea will view Xi's remarks from a historical perspective.
