= Moments (social networking) =

Feature of WeChat

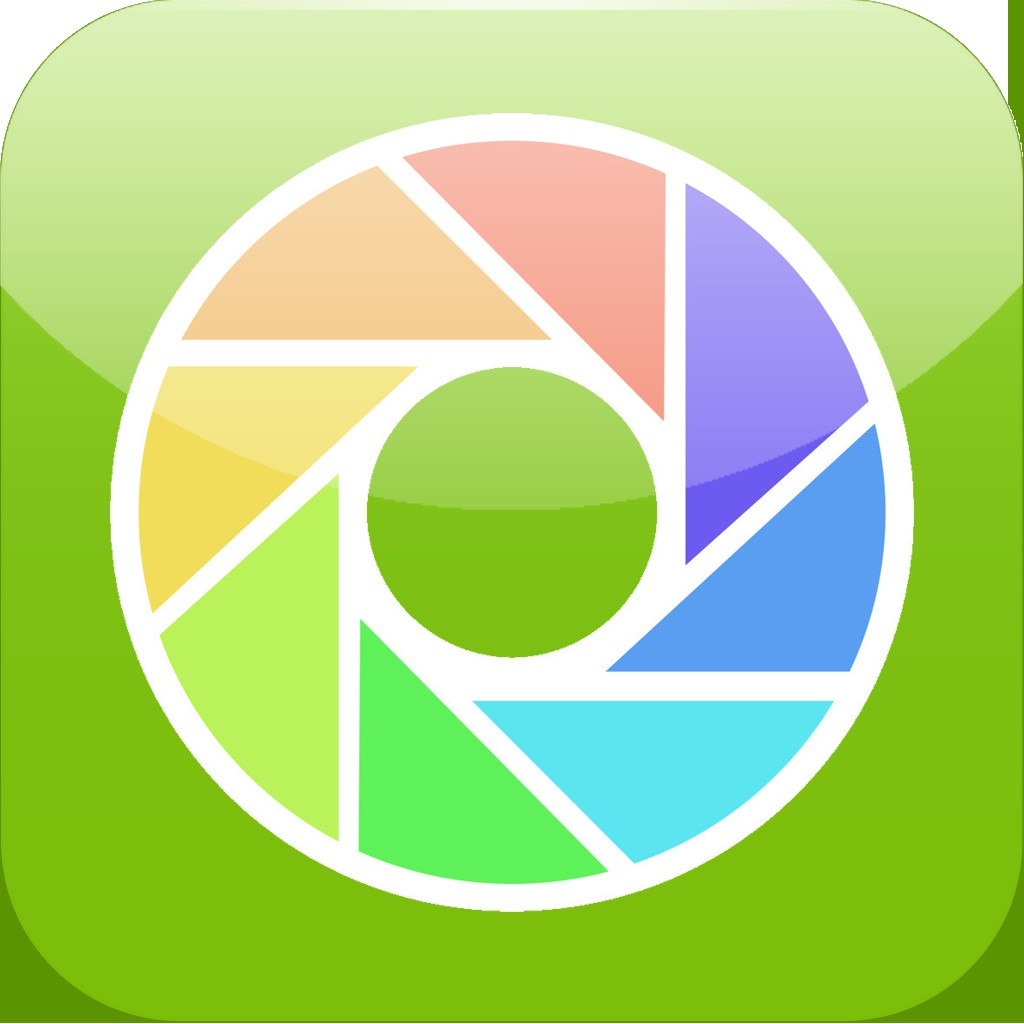
- Moments logo
- Developer: Tencent
- Release: WeChat 4.0: April 19, 2012
- Operating system: iOS, Android, Windows Phone, Symbian, BlackBerry OS, BlackBerry 10, OS X
- Available in: English, Chinese (Simplified & Traditional), Thai, Indonesian, Vietnamese, Malay, Japanese, Korean, Portuguese, Spanish, Polish, Italian, Russian, Hindi, Turkish
- Type: Virtual community
- Licence: Proprietary

Moments (Chinese: 朋友圈; pinyin: péngyǒu quān, lit. 'friends' circle') is a social networking feature of the Tencent communications app WeChat. Moments was launched on 19 April 2012 in WeChat 4.0. Moments uses a friend-based system, meaning that only mutual friends can see each other's Moments. This creates an intimate and private communication circle within the users' choice of close friends.

Moments mainly focuses on sharing photos with captions, while sharing statuses and sharing websites are also permitted.

== History ==
On 19 April 2012, Moments was initially launched with WeChat 4.0.

On 22 August 2012, Moments was updated alongside WeChat 4.2 with the new feature of commenting to mutual friends.

In September 2012, whether to receive the updating of friends and make private photos public could be decided by users.(WeChat 4.3)

In September 2012, WeChat 4.3 brought privacy options, including hiding friends' posts and allowing the privatization of posted content.

On 7:30 22 July 2013, it was widely complained that Moments could not be refreshed.

In March 2014, WeChat 5.21 brought the ability to tag locations of restaurants or scenic areas.

On 19 May 2014, sharing location information was available in Moments. (WeChat 5.3)

On 6 November 2014, Moments allowed recording and posting short videos. (WeChat 6.0.1 for iOS, the same for Android on 24 December 2014)

On 20 January 2015, searching within Moments and "booing" (disliking) posts were allowed. (WeChat 6.1 for iOS, the same for Android on 9 February 2015)

On 18 May 2017, the ability to synchronize Moments posts with Facebook and Twitter was added to the iOS version of Moments.

== Features ==
Being semi-closed is the most significant feature of Moments. After registering a WeChat account, users can add other WeChat users as "friends" and "like" or "comment" on friends’ posts freely. However, different from other social-networking sites or applications, Moments follows the principle of "my friend's friend is not my friend". That is to say, a user can only see those likes and comments made by conjunct friends between the user and the author, while cannot see the expressions made by people beyond their friend lists. Except this general principle, individual setting for blocking certain friends from seeing owners' posts can be made by users.

Strict censorship is another feature of Moments. On December 12, 2014, WeChat announced that according to "related regulations," domains of the web pages that want to get shared in WeChat Moments need to get an ICP license by December 31, 2014, to avoid being restricted by WeChat.

== Derived Cultures ==
According to the On Device Research, WeChat has 93% market penetration in mainland China. Its giant user group and mode of “content proceeding from relationship”enables the development of particular culture in Moments, which can be summarized as “circle culture”. “Circle culture” can further include some specific cultures such as the culture of sharing and“like” and the culture of grouping.

=== Circle culture ===
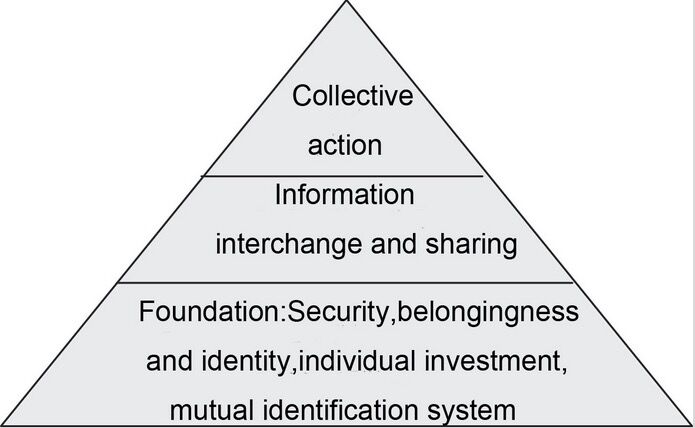
Circle Culture

Moments has strict verification for participants, which makes one's virtual social circle more intimate and tightly formed, and more integrated into real-life social circle. Only mutual friends can set up communication in one circle, which indicates the high reciprocity and exclusivity among acquaintances. Moments accords with the Chinese-style interpersonal structure, which was described as the ripples generating circle by circle when a stone is thrown into water and everyone is in the center of a series of circles. The ties get weaker as the circles spread further.

Moments mainly consolidates strong ties and is supplemented with weak ties, and it functions in three hierarchies of a pyramid structure, from bottom to top.

=== The culture of sharing and “like” ===
The “sharing” function in Moments is of simple operation that it only needs a click on a button. Participants of Moments take pleasure in sharing and being shared possibly out of curiosity and vanity, enhancing the popularity of integrating the function “sharing to Moments” into many other applications or websites. What are frequently shared include selfies, cuisines, travel scenery, essays, propaganda, notices and even rumors. Getting “like”s is another desire among participants. The culture of “like” in Moments suggests a means of pursuing and highlighting one's existence and indicates the rule of interaction among members in a circle. A “like” conveys a strong emotional expression of one's stand and has a social and dissemination function to some extent.

=== The culture of grouping ===
Grouping is a way of dividing social circle, constructing and presenting one's self-image in different dimensions, to different audiences. People can decide in every single sharing that who can see while others not, and all these will be kept to themselves. Grouping provides some people with the opportunity of living in parallel space-time, the right of gaining admiration and the possibility of escapism.

== Positive Impacts ==
- Gave rise to new popular forms of information spreading for commercial, educational or other purposes. Since Moments is a more private space for information sharing, the messages on Moments are generally considered to be more credible.
- Effective way of sharing personal feelings among groups of people. As long as the user has a device connected to the Internet, they can upload. Meanwhile, other users can check their friends’ posts at any time.

== Negative Impacts ==
- Spreading of false information
- Viral marketing

Marketing becomes a problem because some users operate online stores by using their WeChat accounts. To advertise goods, viral marketing methods including utilizing acquaintances network and posting advertisements several times a day in Moments are widely used.

== See also ==
- Qzone
- Instagram
- Facebook
- Twitter
- Sina Weibo
