= List of frigate classes in service =

The list of frigate classes in service includes all those currently with navies or armed forces and auxiliaries in the world. Ships are grouped by type, and listed alphabetically within.

== Absalon-class frigate ==
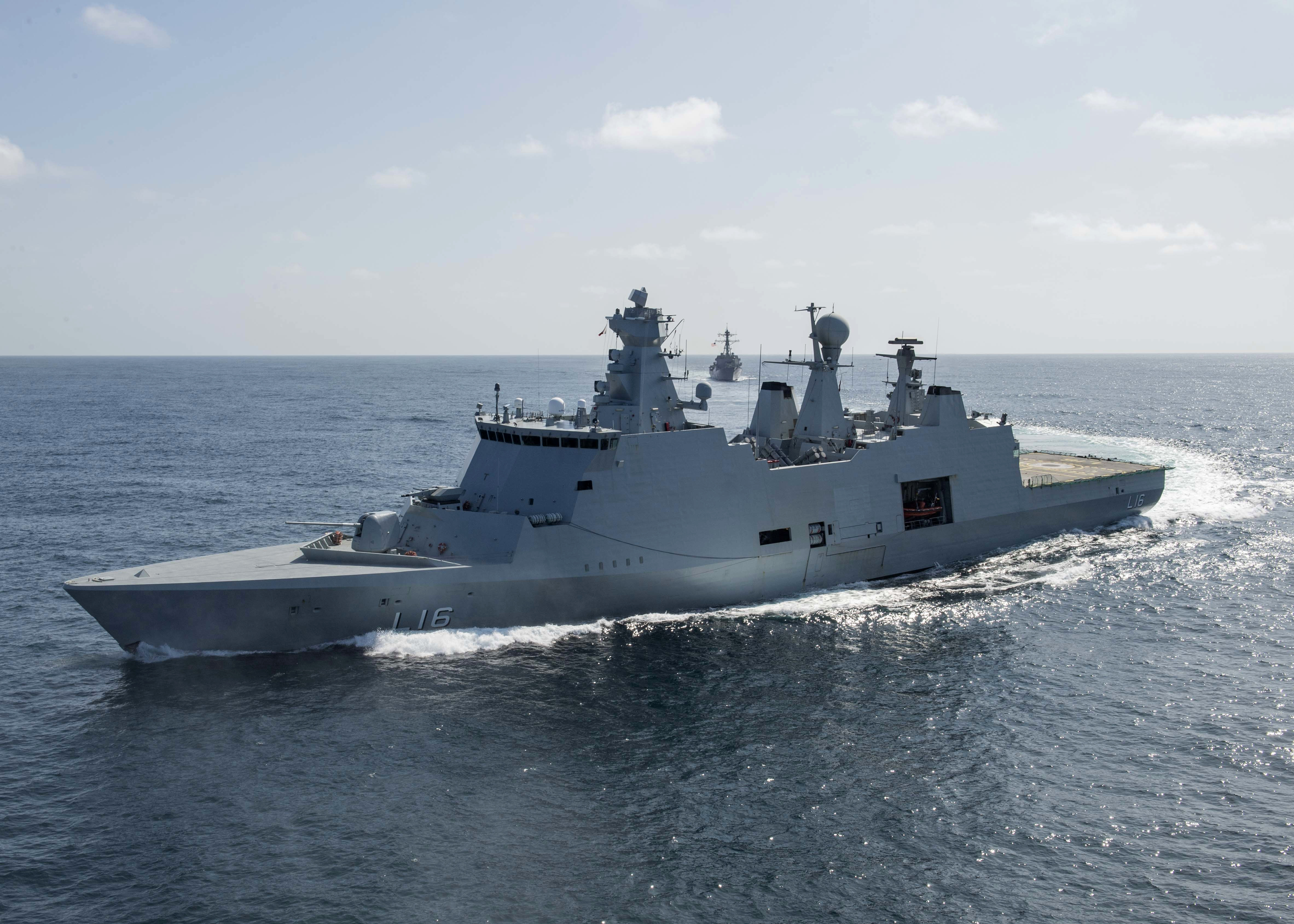
Absalon at sea 2019

- Type: Frigate
- Builder: Denmark
- Displacement: 4,500 tons
- Aircraft: 2 × EH-101 or 2 MH-60R helicopters
- Armament: 36 × RIM-162 ESSM SAM, 16 × Harpoon block II SSM, 1 × 5"/54 caliber Mark 45 gun, 4 × MU90 Impact torpedoes, 2 × Millennium 35mm CIWS, 7 × 12.7mm HMG
- Propulsion: 2 × MTU 8000 M70 diesel engines, Two shafts - 22,300 bhp (16.6 MW)
- Speed: 24 knots (44 km/h)
- Ships in class: 2
- Operator: Royal Danish Navy
- Commissioned: 19 October 2004
- Status: In active service

== Abukuma-class destroyer escort ==
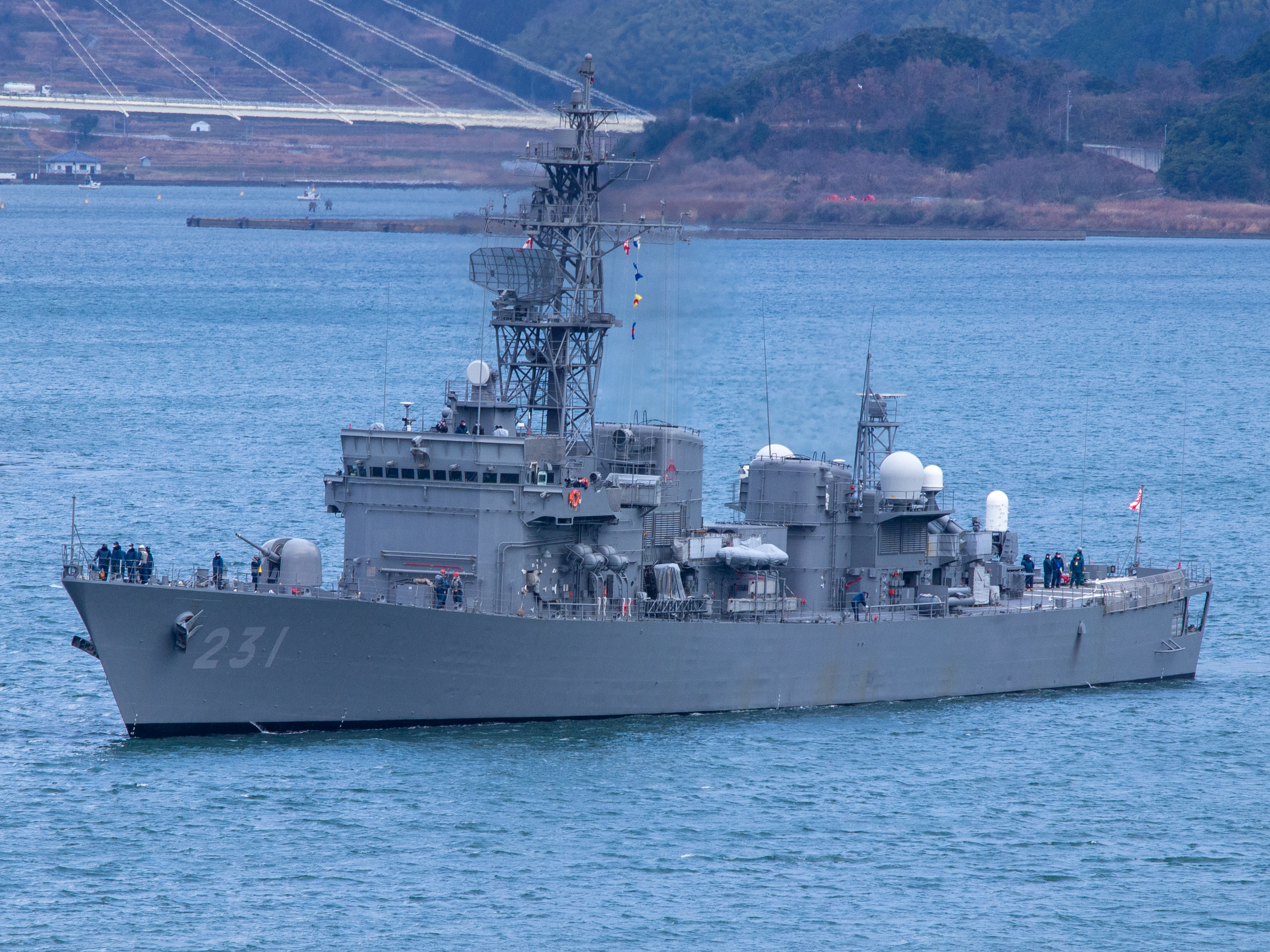
JS Ōyodo(Abukuma-class)

- Type: Destroyer escort
- Builder: Japan
- Displacement: 2,550 tons
- Armament: 8 Harpoon Missiles SSM, ASROC octuple launcher, 1 Otobreda 76 mm, 1 Phalanx CIWS, 1 375 mm ASW rocket launcher, 2 triple 324 mm Mk 32 ASW torpedo tubes
- Propulsion: 2 Spey SM1A gas turbines, 2 Mitsubishi, 2 shafts
- Speed: 27 knots (50 km/h)
- Ships in class: 6
- Operator: Japan Maritime Self-Defense Force
- Commissioned: 12 December 1989
- Status: In active service

== Almirante Padilla-class Frigate ==
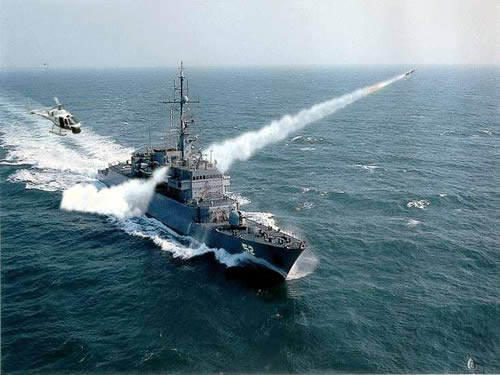
ARC Caldas

- Type: Frigate
- Builder: Germany
- Displacement: 2,100 tons
- Armament: 8 × SSM-700K C-Stars SSM, 2 × SIMBAD SAM 1 × OTO Melara 76 mm/62 cal Strales Compact gun 1 × twin Breda 40 mm/70 guns 6 × 324 mm torpedo tubes
- Propulsion: 2 TB92 diesel engines
- Speed: 27 knots (50 km/h)
- Ships in class: 4
- Operator: Colombian National Navy
- Commissioned: 31 October 1983
- Status: In active service

== Álvaro de Bazán (F100)-class frigate ==
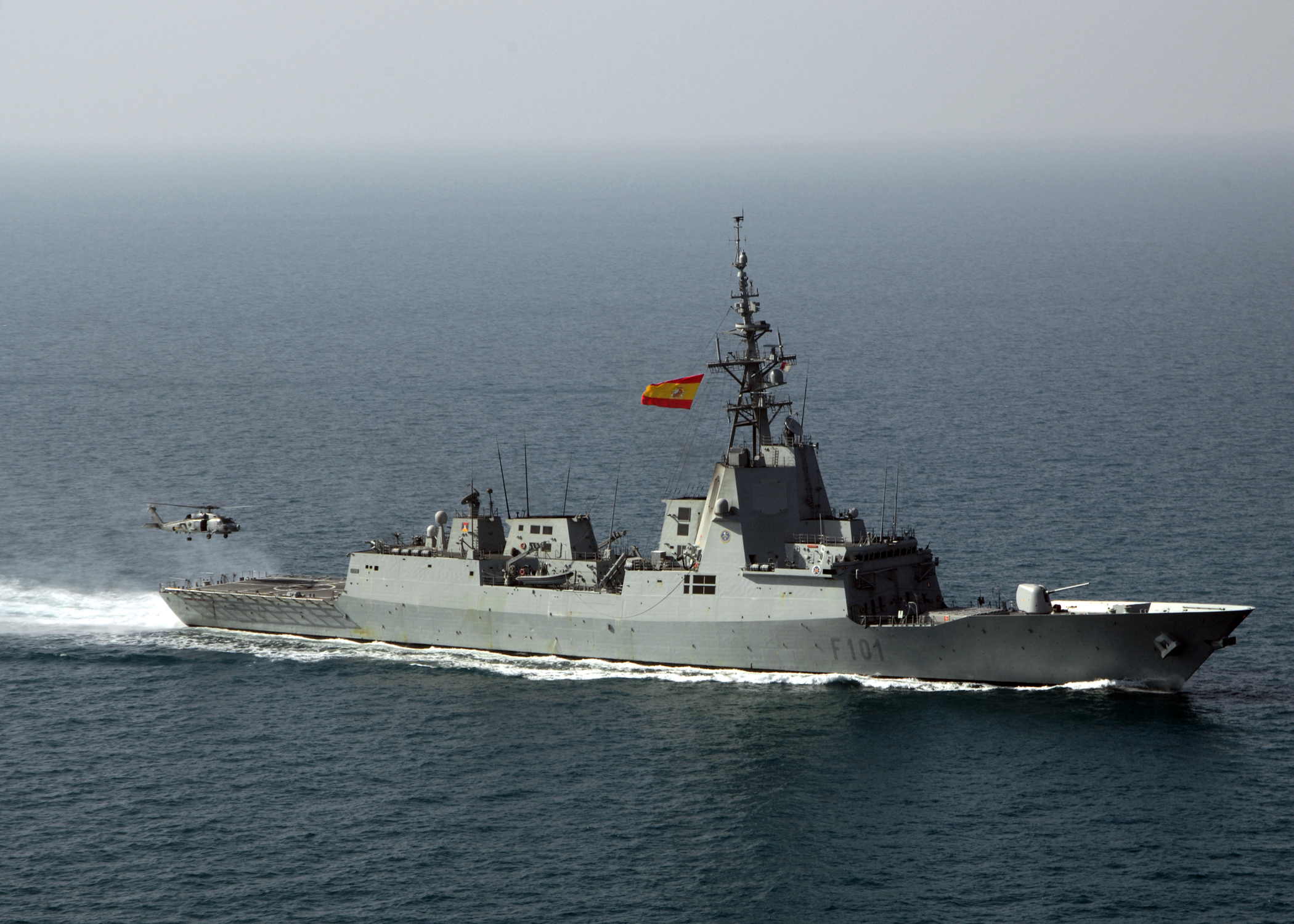
Álvaro de Bazán (F-101)

- Builders: Spain (Navantia, in Ferrol)
- Type: Air defense guided-missile frigate
- Displacement: 6,250 tons
- Aviation: 1 Sikorsky SH-60B LAMPS III Seahawk helicopter
- Armament: 1 × 5-inch/54 Mk45 Mod 2 gun, 2 × CIWS FABA 20 mm/120 Meroka gun, 6 × Mk41 8-cell VLS (32 × Standard SM-2 Block IIIA, 64 × RIM-162 Evolved SeaSparrow Missile), 8 × RGM-84 Harpoon, 4 × 324 mm Mk32 Mod 9 triple Torpedo launchers with 12 Honeywell Mk46 mod 5 Torpedo
- Powerplant: 2 × General Electric LM2500 gas turbines, 2 × Caterpillar 3600 diesel engines
- Speed: 29+ knots
- Ships in class: 5 + (3 under construction)
- Operator: Spanish Navy, Royal Australian Navy (three built as destroyer)
- Commissioned: 19 September 2002
- Status: In active service

== Anzac-class frigate ==
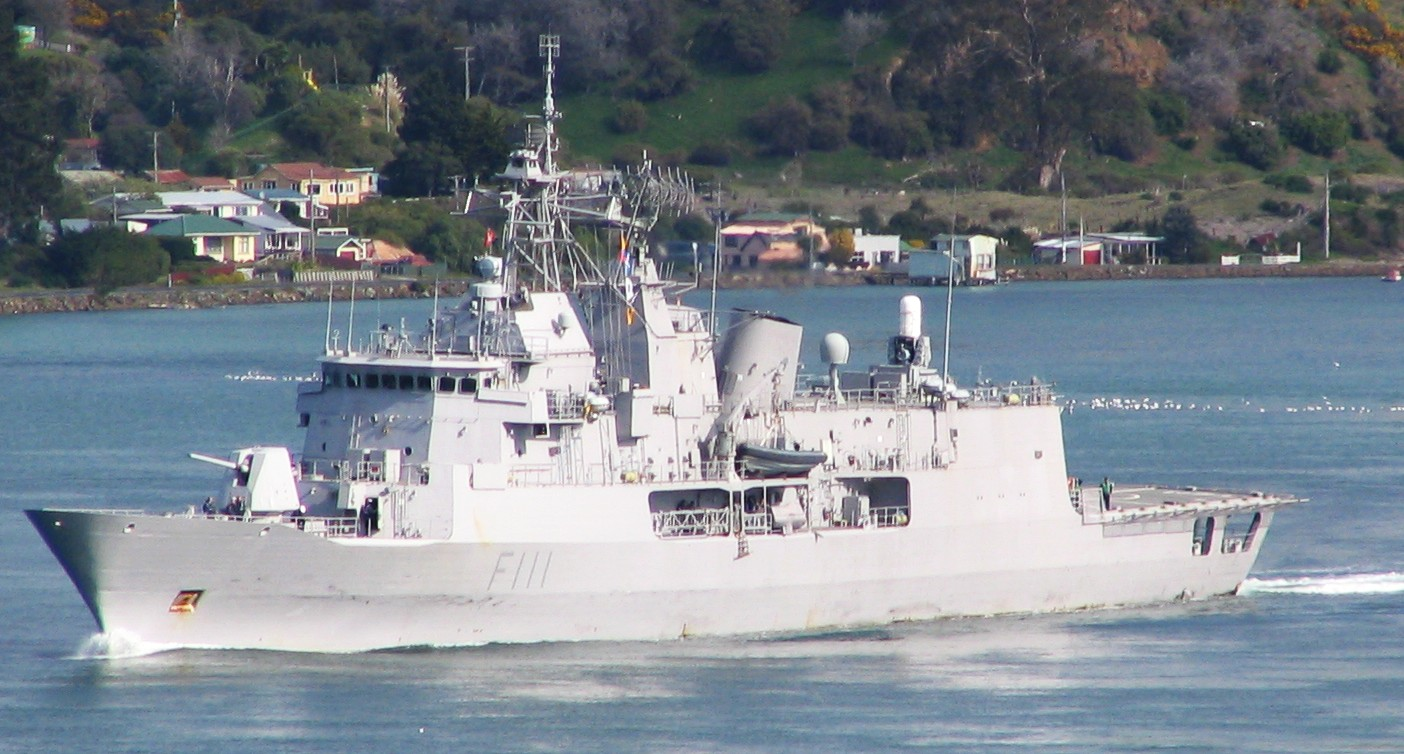
Te Mana (Royal New Zealand Navy)

- Type: Frigate
- Builder: Tenix for Australia, New Zealand
- Displacement: 3,600 tons
- Armament: 1 × 8-cell Mk 41 VLS, 8 × canister launched Harpoon missiles (Australian ships only), 1 × 5 in/54 (127 mm) Mk 45 Mod 2 gun, 6 × 324 mm (2 triple) Mk 32 Mod 5 torpedo tubes, 1 × Phalanx CIWS (NZ ships only), 6 × 50 calibre machine guns.
- Propulsion: 1 × General Electric LM2500+ gas turbine and 2 × MTU 12V1163 TB83 diesel engines, 2 shafts
- Speed: 27 knots (50 km/h)
- Ships in class: 10
- Operator: Royal Australian Navy, Royal New Zealand Navy
- Commissioned: 18 September 1996
- Status: 9 In active service, 1 decommisioned

== Artigliere-class patrol frigate ==
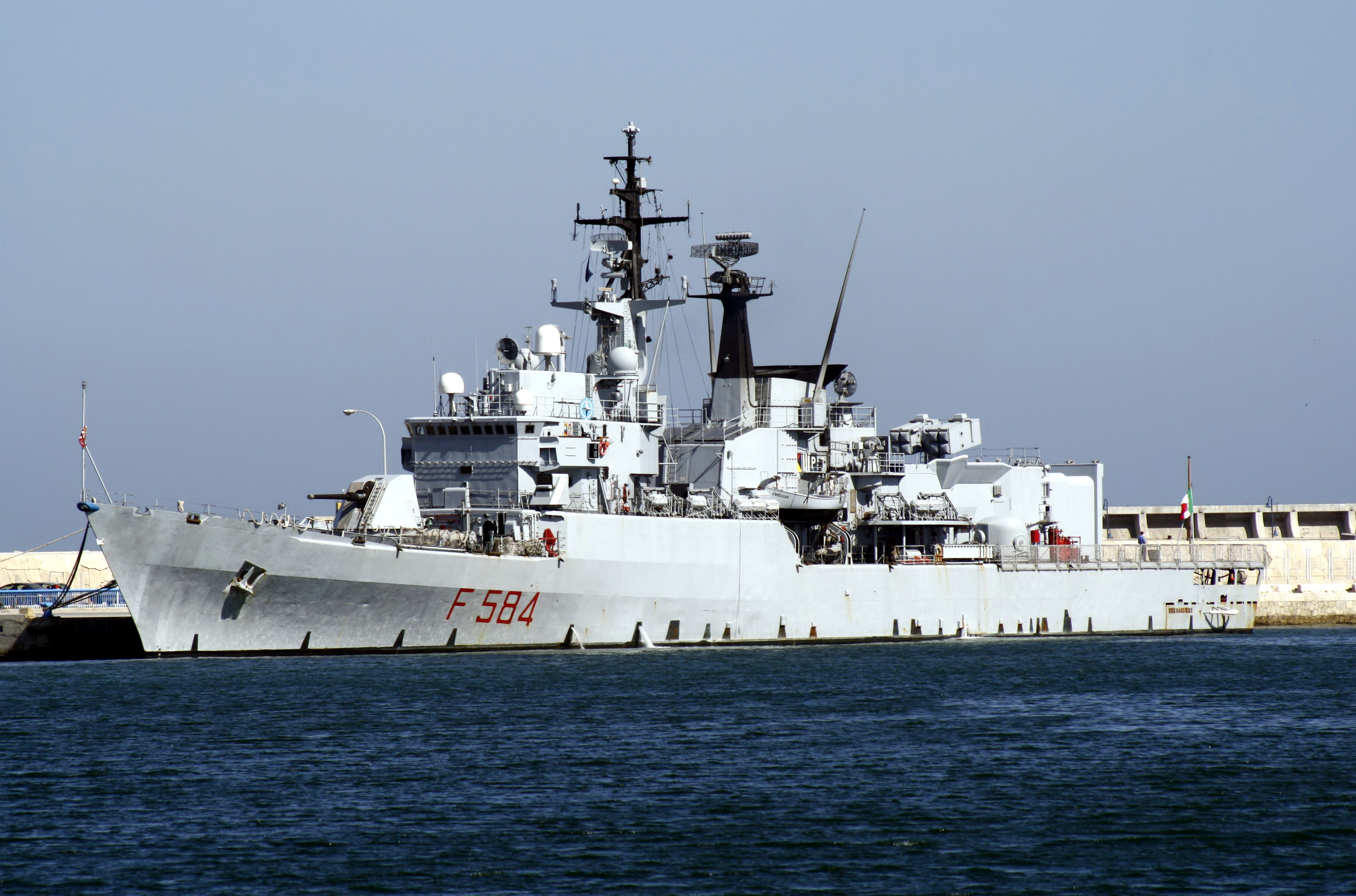
Bersagliere

- Type: Multi-role frigate
- Builder: Italy
- Displacement: 2,400 tons
- Armament: 8 missiles Teseo Otomat SSM, 16 Sea Sparrow SAMs, OTO Melara 127 mm/54 gun, 2 twin Breda 40 mm/70 AA
- Propulsion: 2 gas turbines Fiat/GE LM 2500, 2 Diesel GMT Bl 230.20 M, 2 shafts
- Speed: 35 knots (65 km/h)
- Ships in class: 4
- Operator: Marina Militare
- Commissioned: 1994
- Status: Retired

== Bhumibol Adulyadej-class frigate ==
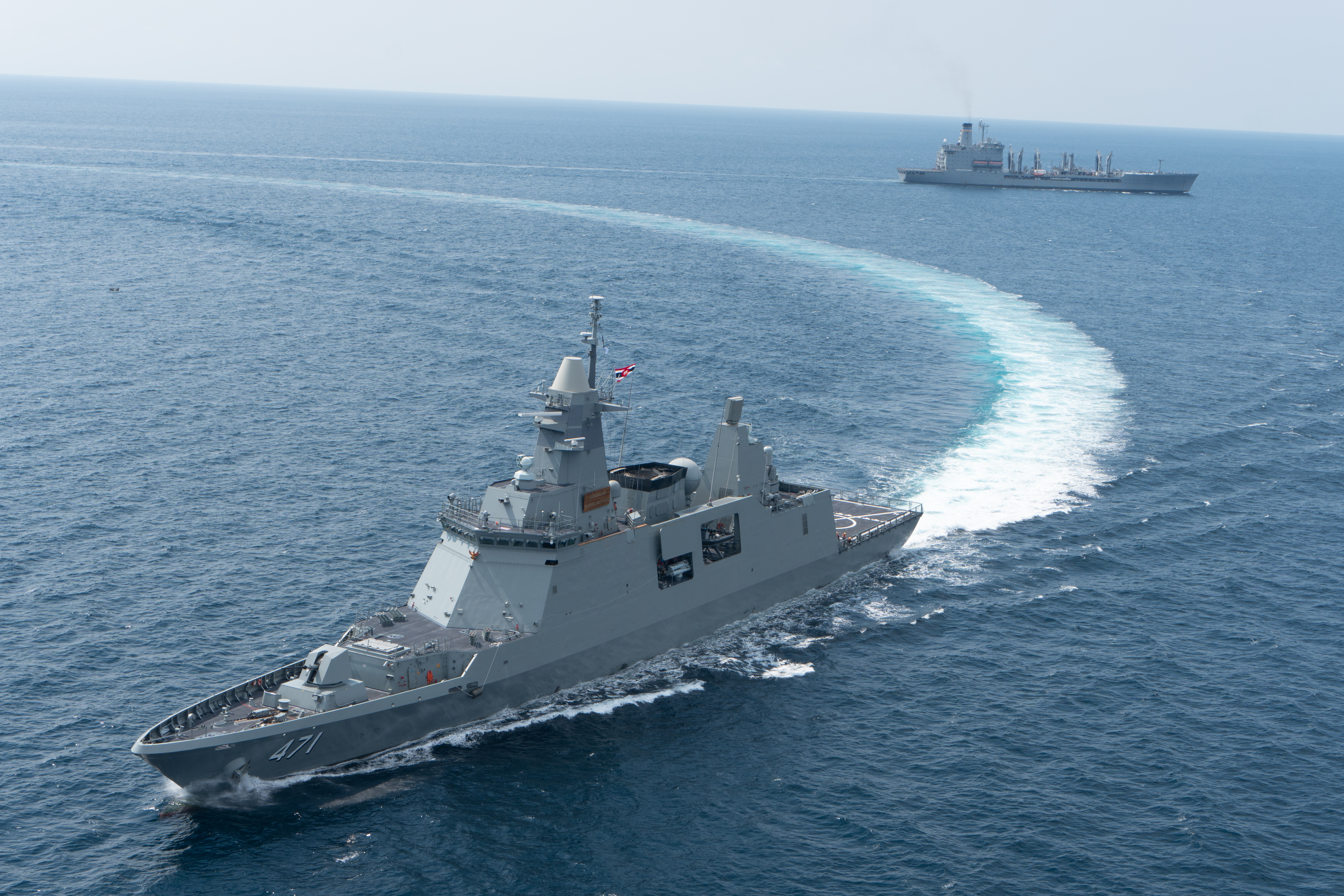
Bhumibol Adulyadej

- Builders: South Korea, Thailand
- Type: Guided-missile frigate
- Displacement: 3,700 tons
- Aircraft: 1 SH-60 Seahawk helicopter
- Armament: 1 OTO Melara 76/62 Super Rapid, 2 30mm DS30M Mark 2, 2 M2 Browning .50 caliber, 1 Phalanx CIWS, 8 RGM-84L Block II Harpoon anti-ship missile, 8-cell Mk. 41 VLS
- Propulsion: 2 × Diesel engine MTU 16V1163 M94, 1 × General Electric LM2500 gas turbine
- Speed: 33.3 knots
- Ships in class: 1
- Operator: Royal Thai Navy
- Commissioned: 7 January 2019
- Status: In active service

== Brahmaputra-class frigate ==
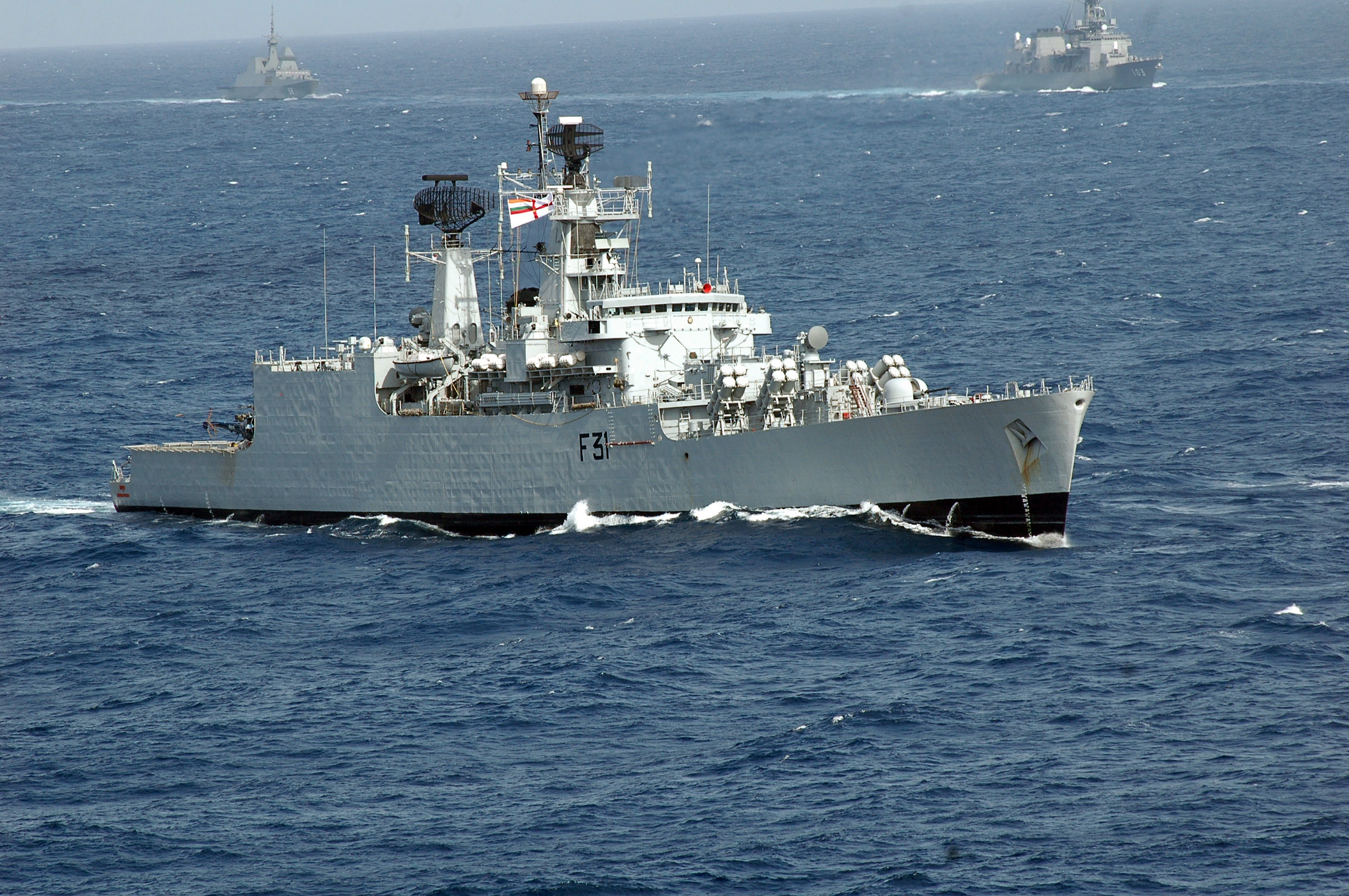
Brahmaputra

- Builders: India
- Type: Guided-missile frigate
- Displacement: 3,850 tons
- Armament: 16 3M-24E (SS-N-25 Switchblade) SSMs, Barak 1 system, 1 Otobreda 76 mm gun, 1 AK-630 30 mm, 2 triple torpedo tubes with Whitehead A244S torpedoes
- Propulsion: Two Bhopal turbines, two 550 psi boilers, 2 shafts
- Speed: 30+ knots
- Ships in class: 3
- Operator: Indian Navy
- Commissioned: 14 April 2000
- Status: In active service

== Brandenburg-class frigate ==
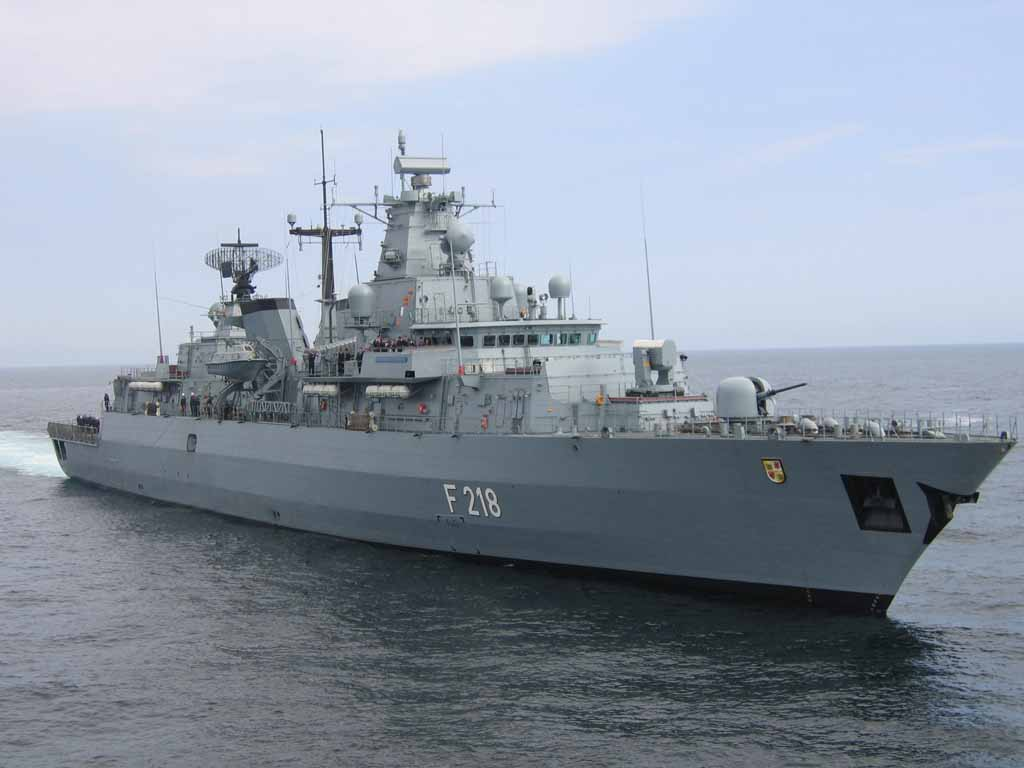
Mecklenburg-Vorpommern

- Builders: Germany
- Type: Anti-submarine guided-missile frigate
- Displacement: 4,900 tons
- Aircraft: 2 Sea Lynx Mk.88A or 2 NH90 helicopters
- Armament: 1 VLS with 16 cells Sea Sparrow SAM; 2 RAM launchers (21 missiles each); 4 Exocet SSM; 1 Otobreda 76 mm gun; 2 MLG 27 autocannons; 4 324 mm torpedo tubes with Mk46 Mod 2 torpedoes
- Powerplant: 2 MTU 20V 956 TB92 diesel-engines, 2 General Electric LM2500 gas turbines; 2 shafts
- Speed: 29 knots
- Ships in class: 4
- Operator: German Navy
- Commissioned: 1994–1996
- Status: In active service

== De Zeven Provinciën-class frigate ==
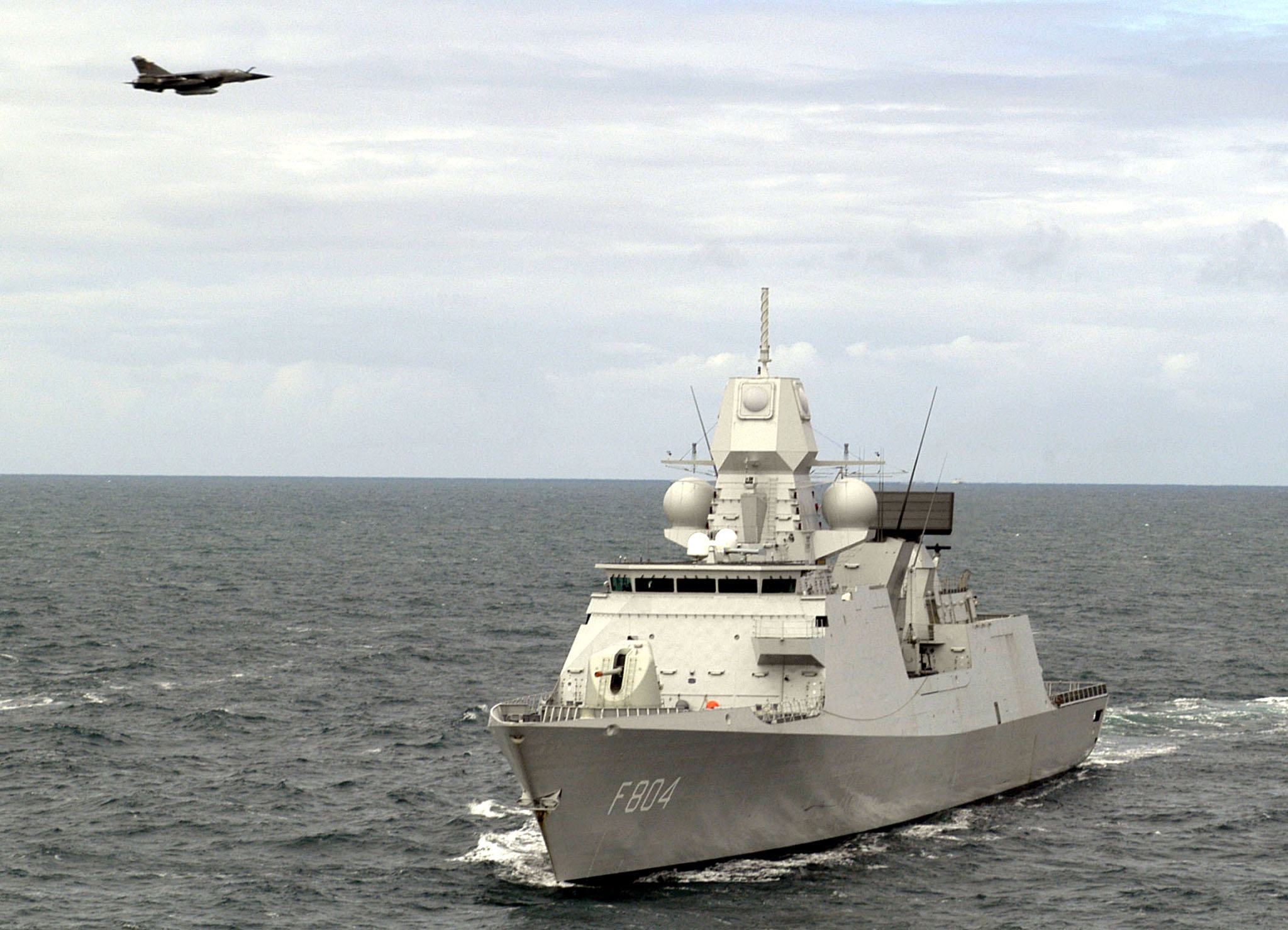
De Ruyter

- Builders: Netherlands (Royal Schelde)
- Type: Air-defense and command frigate
- Displacement: 6,050 tons
- Armament: 5 Mk41 VLS with 8 cells each containing 32 ESSM and 32 SM-2 IIIA, 1-2 Goalkeeper CIWS, 2 quadruple Harpoon SSM, 1 Oto Breda 127 mm/54 dual-purpose gun, 2 twin MK32 Mod 9 torpedo launchers with Raytheon MK46 Mod 5 torpedoes
- Powerplant: 2 Stork Wärtsilä 16V26 diesel engines, 2 Rolls-Royce Spey SM1a gas turbines, 2shafts
- Speed: 30 knots
- Ships in class: 4
- Operator: Royal Netherlands Navy
- Commissioned: 26 April 2002
- Status: In active service

== Floréal-class frigate ==
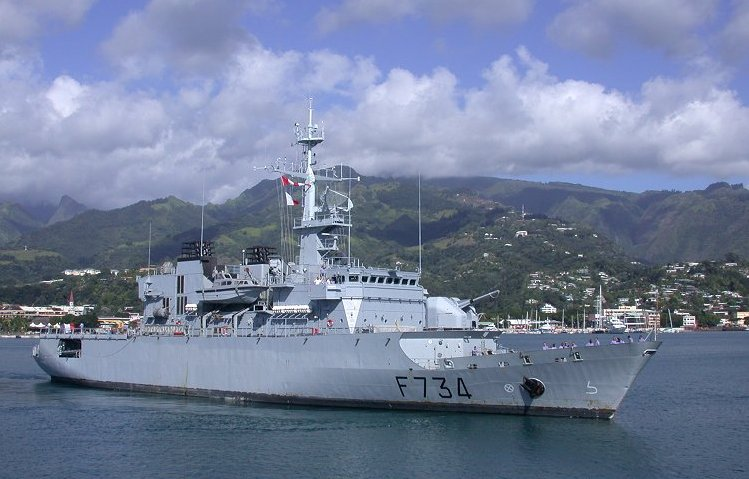
Vendémiaire in Papeete harbor

- Builders: France
- Type: Patrol frigate (French designation Fregate de Surveillance)
- Displacement: 2,750 tons
- Aircraft: 1 Eurocopter Panther helicopter
- Armament: 2 Exocet MM38 SSM; 1 × 100 mm gun; 2 × 20 mm guns
- Powerplant: 4 Pielstick diesel engines; 2 shafts; 8,800 hp total power
- Speed: 20 knots
- Range: 10,000 nmi at 15 knots
- Ships in class: 8
- Operators: Marine Nationale, Royal Moroccan Navy
- Commissioned: 1991
- Status: In active service

== Formidable-class frigate ==
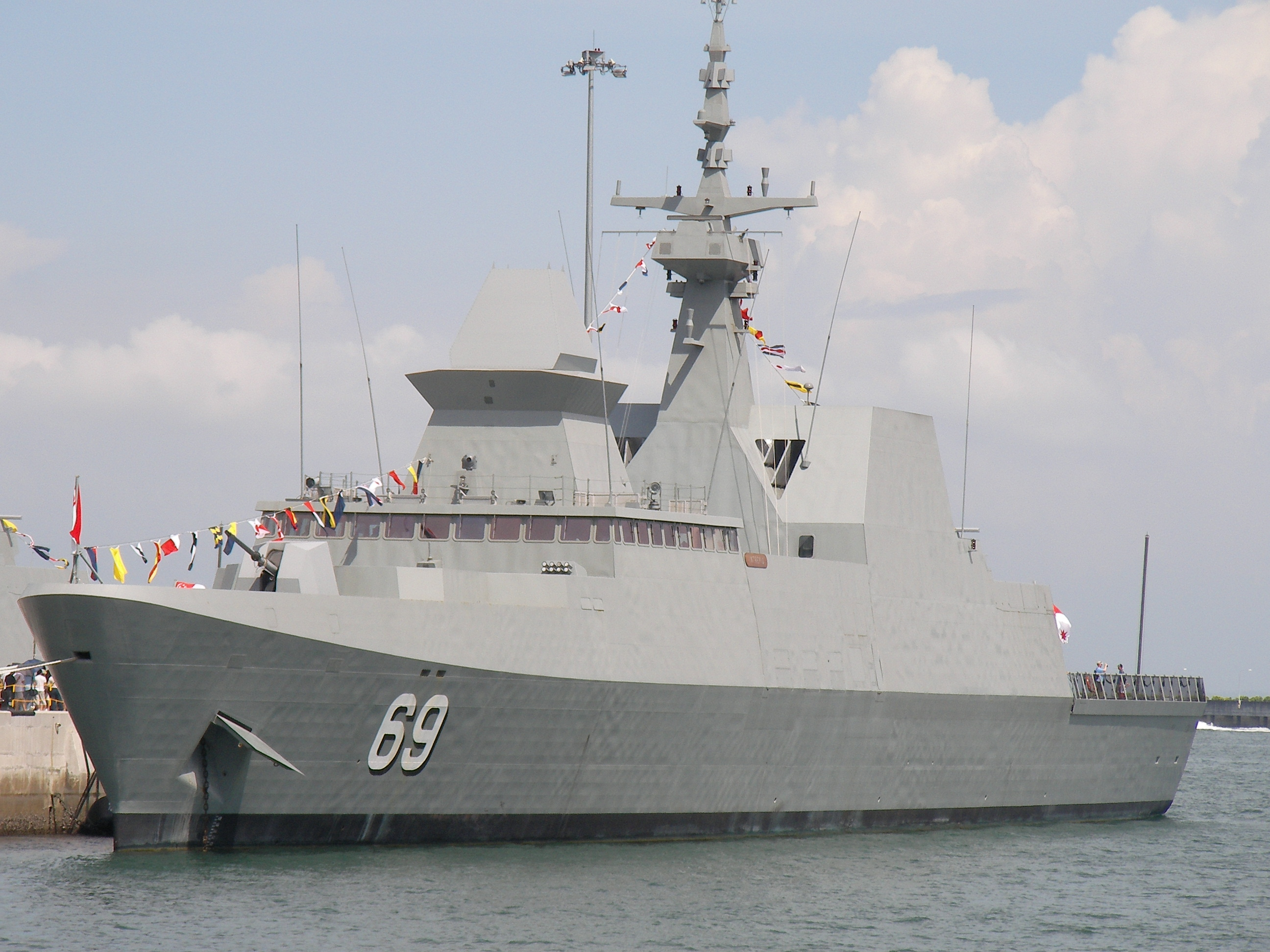
Intrepid

- Builders: France / Singapore
- Type: Stealth frigate
- Displacement: 3,200 long tons (3,300 t)
- Aircraft: 1 Sikorsky S-70B helicopter
- Armament: Harpoon SSM; MBDA Aster SAM; Whitehead Alenia A.224S torpedoes; Otobreda 76 mm gun
- Powerplant: MTU 20V 8000 diesel engines x4 at 8,200 kW each, two shafts
- Speed: 27 knots (50 km/h)
- Range: 4,000 nautical miles (7,000 km)
- Ships in class: 6
- Operator: Republic of Singapore Navy
- Commissioned: 2004
- Status: In active service

== FREMM multipurpose frigate (multiple classes) ==
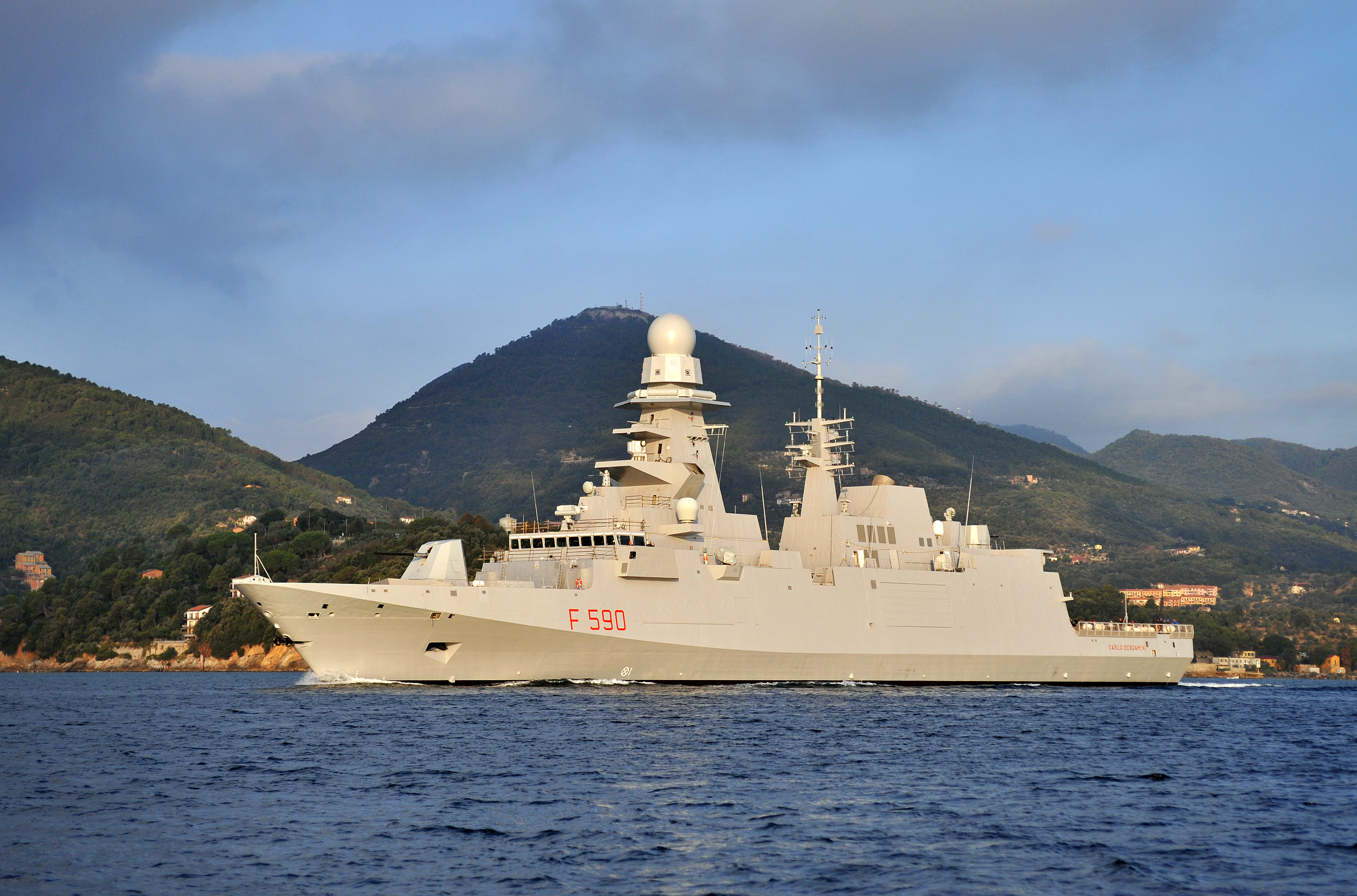
Italian first FREMM Bergamini

- Builders: France/Italy
- Type: Stealth Multipurpose frigate
- Displacement: France 6,000 long tons (6,100 t); Italy 6,700 long tons (6,800 t)
- Aircraft: 1 NH90 or 2 SH90 helicopters
- Armament: Sylver VLS; MBDA Aster AAW and ASW; Exocet (France) and Teseo/Otomat Mk-2A Anti-ship missiles; MU90 torpedoes; OTO Melara 76 mm guns
- Powerplant: CODLOG/CODLAG
- Speed: France +27 knots (50 km/h); Italy +30 knots (56 km/h)
- Range: France 6,000 nautical miles (11,000 km), Italy 6,800 nautical miles (13,000 km)
- Ships in class: 16
- Operators: French Navy: Aquitaine-class, 8 ships
  Marina Militare: Bergamini-class, 10 ships
  Egyptian Navy: Aquitaine-class (purchased from France), 1 ship. Bergamini-class (purchased from Italy), 2 ships
  Royal Moroccan Navy: Mohammed VI (single ship class)
  United States Navy: Constellation-class, 2 ships
- Commissioned: 2012–present
- Status: In active service

== Fridtjof Nansen-class frigate ==
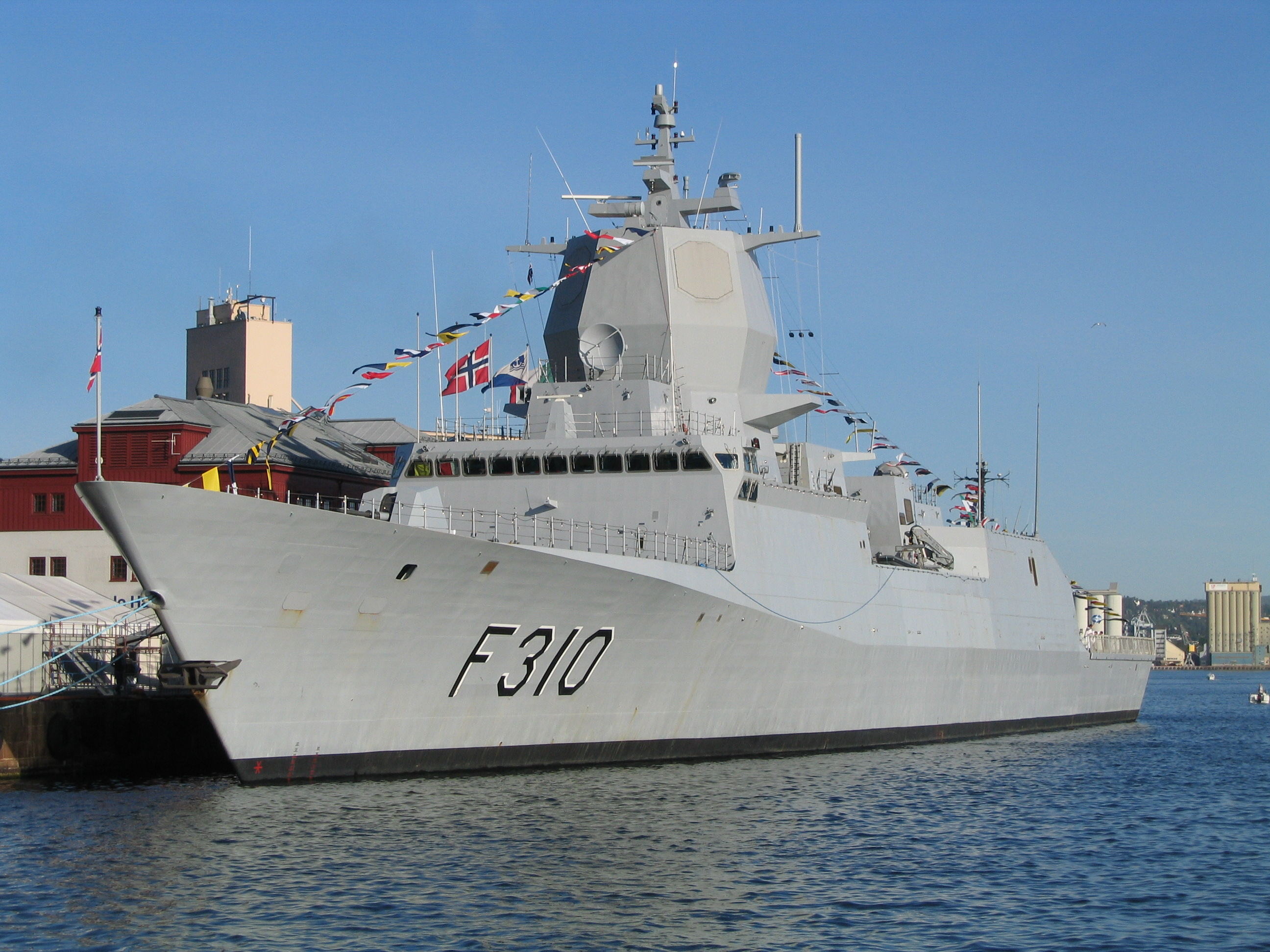
Fridtjof Nansen

- Builders: Spain (Navantia in Ferrol)
- Type: ASW/multirole frigate
- Displacement: 5,121 tons
- Aircraft: 1 NHI NH90 helicopter
- Armament: Mk41 VLS 32 × ESSM; 8 × Naval Strike Missile SSM; 1 × 76 mm OTO Melara(SR) gun; 4 machine guns; Depth charge; 4 × 12.75-inch torpedo tubes for Sting Ray torpedoes
- Powerplant: 2 Two BAZAN BRAVO 12V 4.5 MW diesel engines
- Speed: 26+ knots; One GE LM2500 21.5 MW gas turbine+2 Diesel 4.5 MW each; 2 shafts
- Ships in class: 5
- Operator: Royal Norwegian Navy
- Commissioned: 5 April 2006
- Status: In active service

== Halifax-class frigate ==
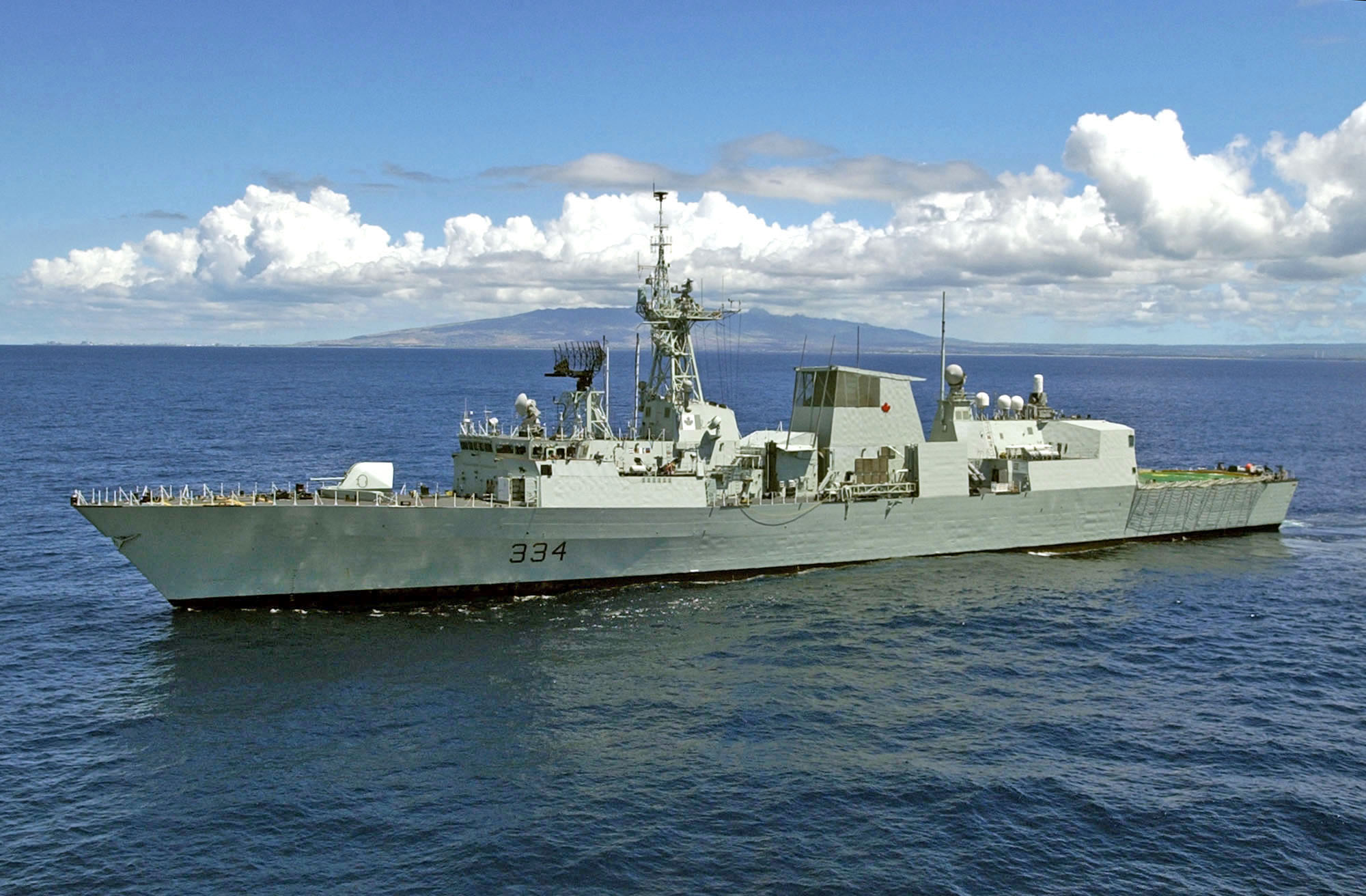
Regina

- Builders: Canada (Saint John Shipbuilding, Saint John, NB & MIL Davie Shipbuilding, Lauzon, QC)
- Type: Large multi-role guided-missile frigate with helicopter (Designated multi-role patrol frigate in the CF)
- Displacement: 4,770 tons
- Aircraft: 1 × CH-148 Cyclone helicopter
- Armament: 8 × MK 141 RGM-84 Harpoon SSM; 16 × Sea Sparrow SAM/SSM; 1 × Bofors SAK 57 mm; 1 × Phalanx CIWS (Block 1); 8 × M2 Machine Guns; 4 × MK 32 torpedo launchers
- Powerplant: CODOG – 2 shafts: 2 turbines (47,500 shp), 1 diesel (8,800 shp)
- Speed: 29+ knots
- Ships in class: 12
- Operator: Royal Canadian Navy
- Commissioned: 29 June 1992
- Status: In active service

== Hamilton–class cutter ==
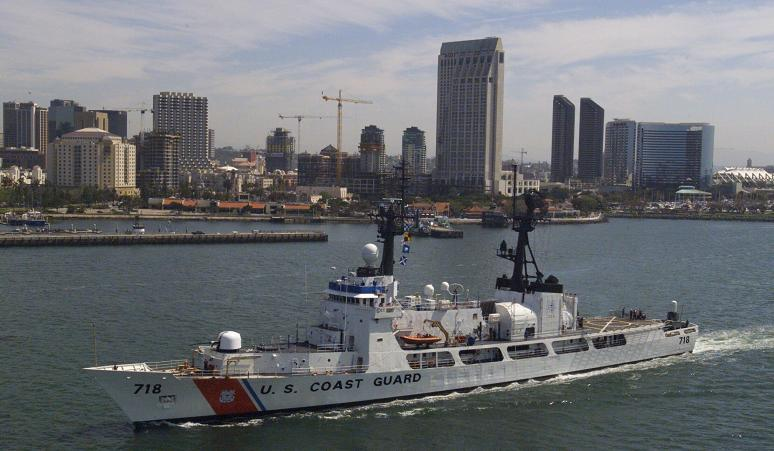
Chase

* Builders: United States

- Type: High Endurance Cutter
- Displacement: 3,250 metric tons
- Armament:
  - 1 × OTO Melara Mk 75 76 mm gun
  - 2 × Mk 38 25 mm Machine Gun Systems
  - 1 × Phalanx CIWS
  - 6 × .50 cal machine guns
- Speed: 29 knots
- Ships in class: 12
- Operators: United States Coast Guard, Philippine Navy, Nigerian Navy, Bangladesh Navy, Vietnam Coast Guard, Sri Lanka Navy
- Commissioned: 27 September 1971
- Status: In active service

== Hydra-class frigate ==
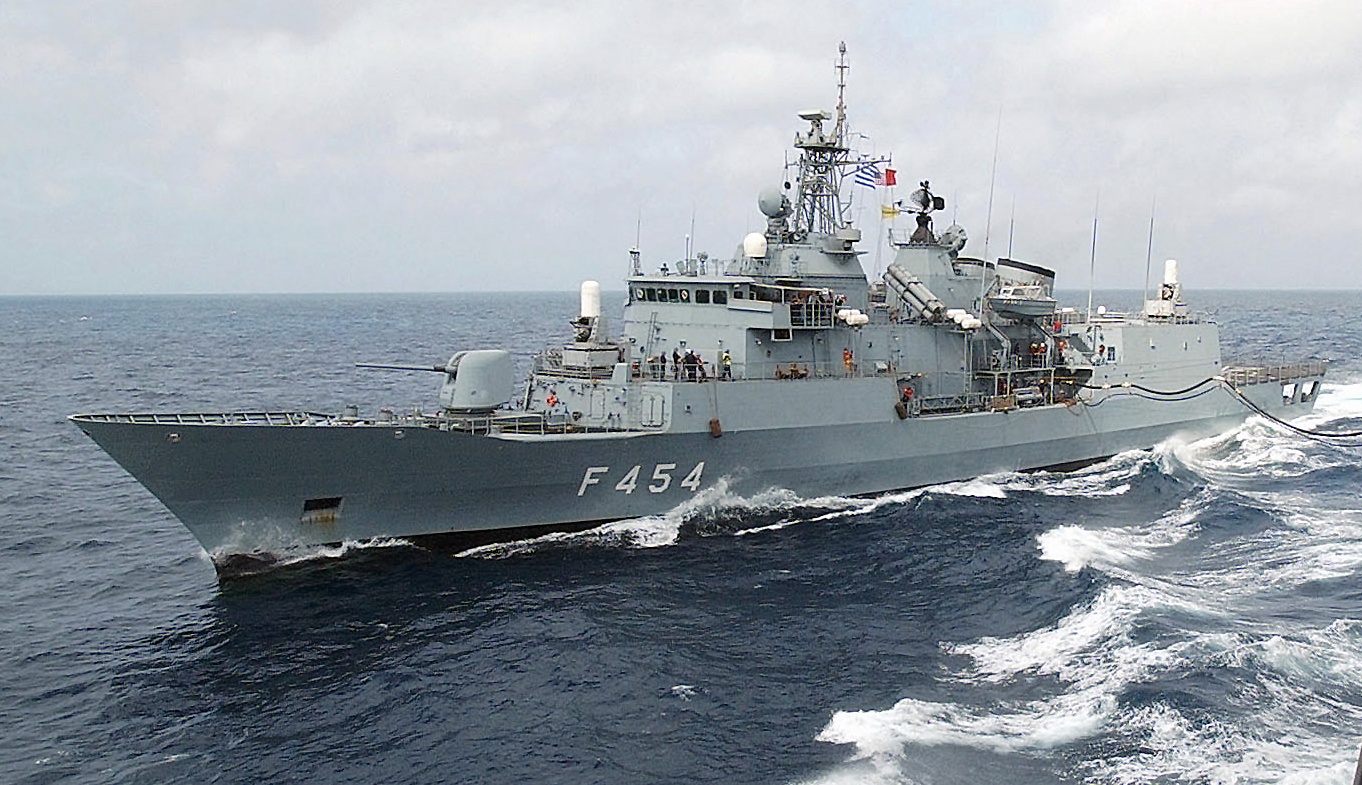
Psara

- Builders: Germany, Greece
- Type: Multi-purpose frigate
- Displacement: 3,360 tons
- Armament: 16 ESSM SAM; 8 Harpoon AShM; 1 × Mk 42 5 inch gun; 2 Phalanx CIWS; 2 triple torpedo tubes
- Powerplant: CODOG, 2 shafts
- Speed: 31 knots
- Ships in class: 4
- Operator: Hellenic Navy
- Commissioned: 1992
- Status: In active service

== Incheon-class frigate ==
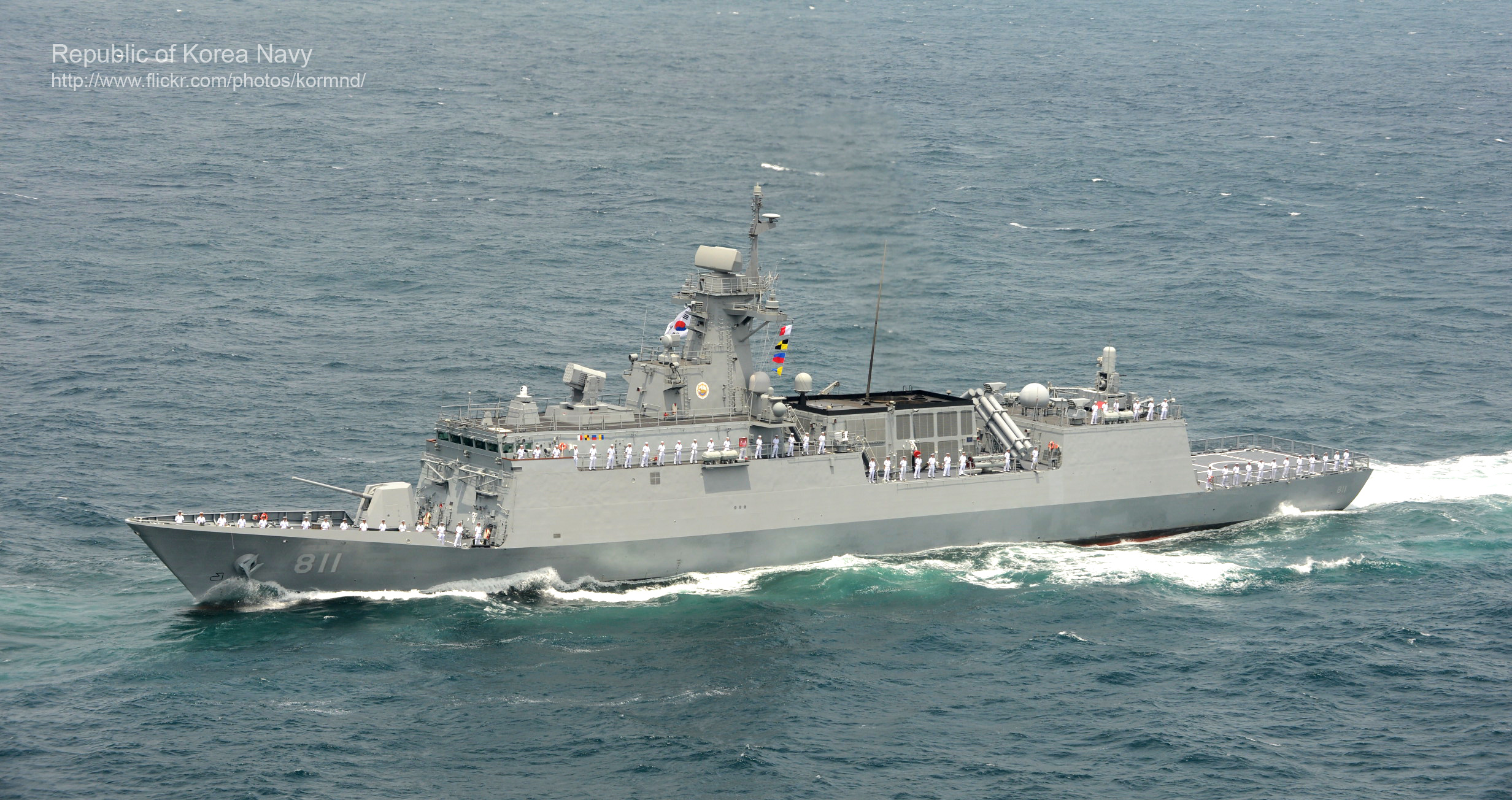
Incheon

- Builders: South Korea
- Type: Coastal defense frigate
- Displacement: 2,800 tons
- Armament: 1 Mk 45 Mod 4 127mm gun, 1 20mm Phalanx CIWS, 1 RAM block 1, 16 SSM-700K Haeseong missiles, 2 triple torpedo tubes
- Powerplant: CODOG 2 General Electric LM-2500 Gas turbine, 2 MTU 1163 TB83 diesel engine
- Speed: 30 knots
- Range: 8,000 at 18 knots
- Ships in class: 6
- Operator: Republic of Korea Navy
- Commissioned: 17 January 2013
- Status: In active service

== Istanbul-class frigate ==
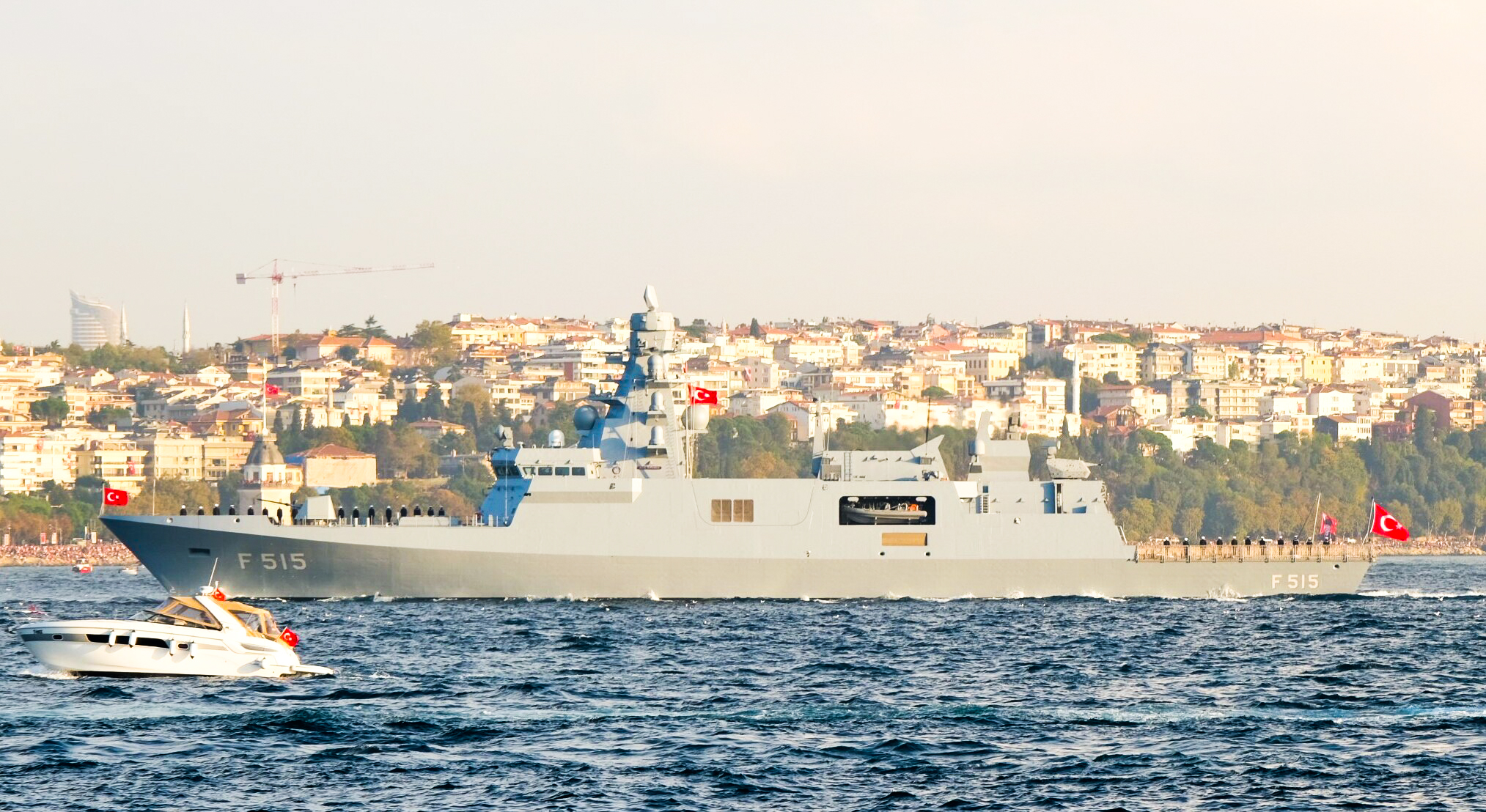
TCG İstanbul

- Builders: Turkey
- Type: Multirole frigate
- Displacement: 3100 tons
- Armament: Guns:1 × OTO Melara 76 mm Super Rapid or MKE National Naval Gun main gun, 1 × Aselsan GOKDENIZ 35 mm dual barreled CIWS, 2 × Aselsan STOP 25 mm RCWS Anti-ship missiles: 16 × Atmaca anti-ship missiles Vertical launching system: 16-cell MIDLAS Vertical Launching System: Up to 16 SAPAN or SIPER Surface-to-air missile Torpedoes: 2 × 324 mm (13 in) Triple Torpedo launchers with MK-46M5 or Akya Torpedo
- Powerplant: 1 x LM2500 Gas turbine, 2 x 5.766HP MTU Diesel Machine
- Speed: Economy: 14 kn (26 km/h; 16 mph), Maximum: 29 kn (54 km/h; 33 mph)
- Range: 5.700 nmi (10.556 km; 6.559 mi) at 14 kn (26 km/h; 16 mph)
- Ships in class: 4 (Planned:8, Building:3, Completed:1, Active:1)
- Aircraft carried: Hangar and platform for: S-70B Seahawk ASW helicopter, Unmanned aerial vehicles (UAV)
- Operator: Turkish Navy
- Commissioned: 2024–present
- Status: In active service

== Iver Huitfeldt-class frigate ==
- Builders: Denmark (Odense Staalskibsværft)
- Type: Air Defense Frigate
- Displacement: 6,645 tons
- Aircraft: 1 × Westland Lynx Mk 90B (or, from 2017, 1 × Seahawk MH-60R)
- Armament: 2 × 76 mm OTO Melara guns; 1 × 35 mm CIWS gun; 4 × Mk 41 Vertical Launch Systems (VLS) with up to 32 SM-2 IIIA SAM surface-to-air missiles;
- 2 × Mk 56 VLS with up to 24 RIM-162 ESSM SAM surface-to-air missiles; 8-16 × Harpoon Block II SSM surface-to-surface missiles; 2 × dual MU90 Impact ASW torpedo launchers for anti-submarine torpedoes
- Powerplant: MTU 8000 20V M70 diesel engines, 8,2 MW each. Two shafts, CODAD
- Speed: 30 knots (56 km/h; 35 mph)
- Range: 9,300 nautical miles (17,200 km; 10,700 mi) at 18 knots (33 km/h; 21 mph)
- Complement: 165 officers and sailors
- Ships in class: 3 (HDMS Iver Huitfeldt (F361), HDMS Peter Willemoes (F362) and HDMS Niels Juel (F363))
- Operator: Royal Danish Navy
- Commissioned: 2012
- Status: In active service

== Karel Doorman-class frigate ==
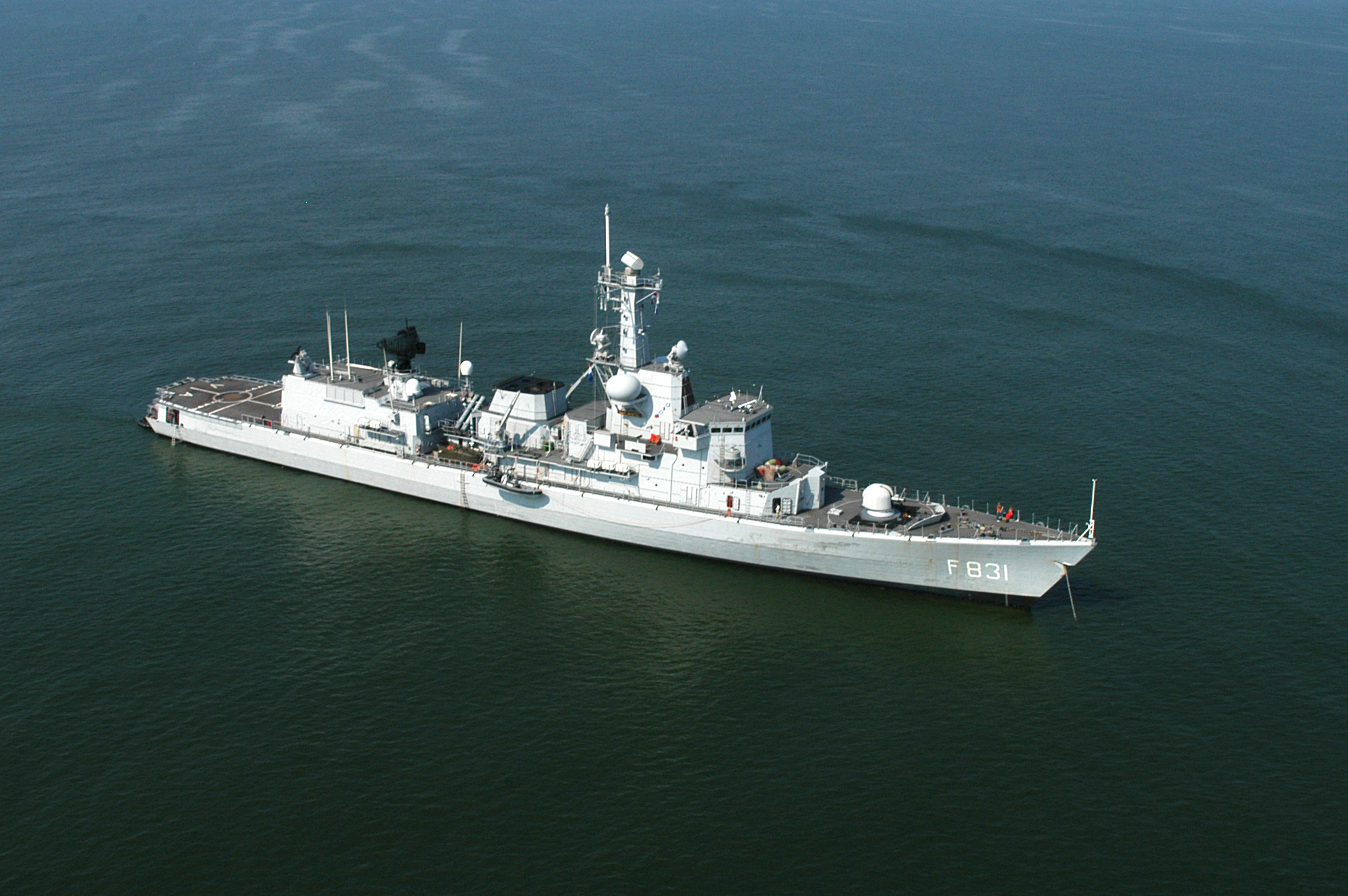
Van Amstel (Royal Netherlands Navy)

- Builders: Netherlands
- Type: Multi-purpose frigate
- Displacement: 3,320 tons
- Armament: Oto Melara 76 mm gun, Sea Sparrow VLS; Harpoon Missile; Goalkeeper CIWS; Mk 46 Torpedoes
- Powerplant: 2 Rolls-Royce (Spey 1A) gas turbines (33.800 pk total), 2* Stork-Werkspoor diesel engines (9.790 pk total)
- Speed: 29 knots
- Ships in class: 8
- Operators: Royal Netherlands Navy, Belgian Navy, Chilean Navy, Portuguese Navy
- Commissioned: 31 May 1991
- Status: In active service

== Kasturi-class frigate ==
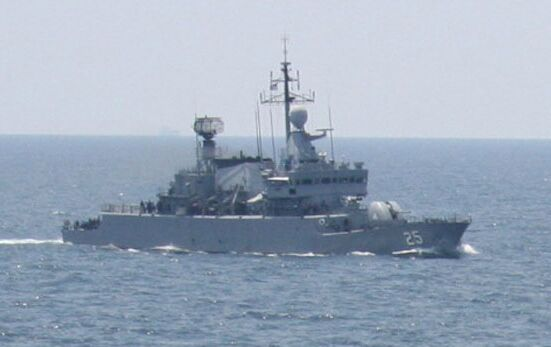
Kasturi

- Builders: Germany (Blohm + Voss in Kiel)
- Type: Light frigate
- Displacement: 1,850 tons
- Armament: 1 × Creusot Loire Compact 100 mm/55 DP gun, 1 × Bofors 57 mm/70 DP gun, 2 dual 30 mm Emerlec Mk 74 twin mountings AA gun, MANPADs SAM, 8 × MBDA Exocet MM40-Block 2, 1 × Bofors 375 mm twin barrel ASW
- Powerplant: 4 × MTU 20V 1163 TB92 diesels, 21.460 hp, 2 shafts
- Speed: 28 knots
- Ships in class: 2 total:
- Operator: Royal Malaysian Navy
- Commissioned: 15 August 1984
- Status: In active service

== Knox-class frigate ==
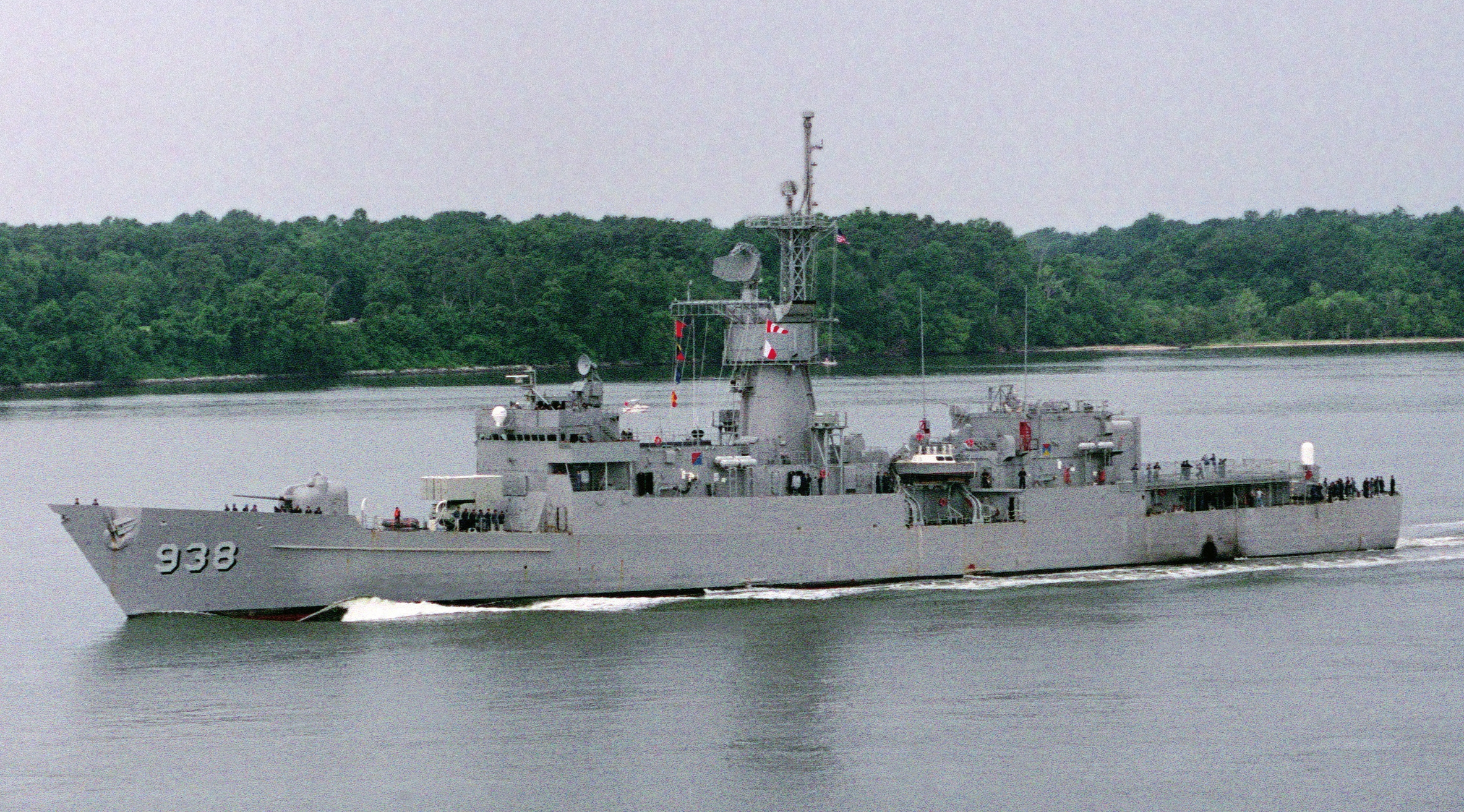
Ning Yang (Republic of China Navy)

- Builders: United States, Spain
- Type: Anti-submarine frigate
- Displacement: 4,200 tons
- Aviation: 1 helicopter
- Armament: 8 ASROC; 8 Harpoon SSM; 1 × Mk 42 5-inch/54 caliber gun; 1 Phalanx CIWS; 4 Mk 46 torpedo tubes
- Powerplant: 2 – 1200 psi boilers; 1 geared turbine, 1 shaft; 35,000 hp
- Speed: 27 knots
- Ships in class: 51
- Operators: Republic of China Navy, Egyptian Navy
- Commissioned: 12 April 1969
- Status: Some in active service

== Koni (Project 1159)-class frigate ==
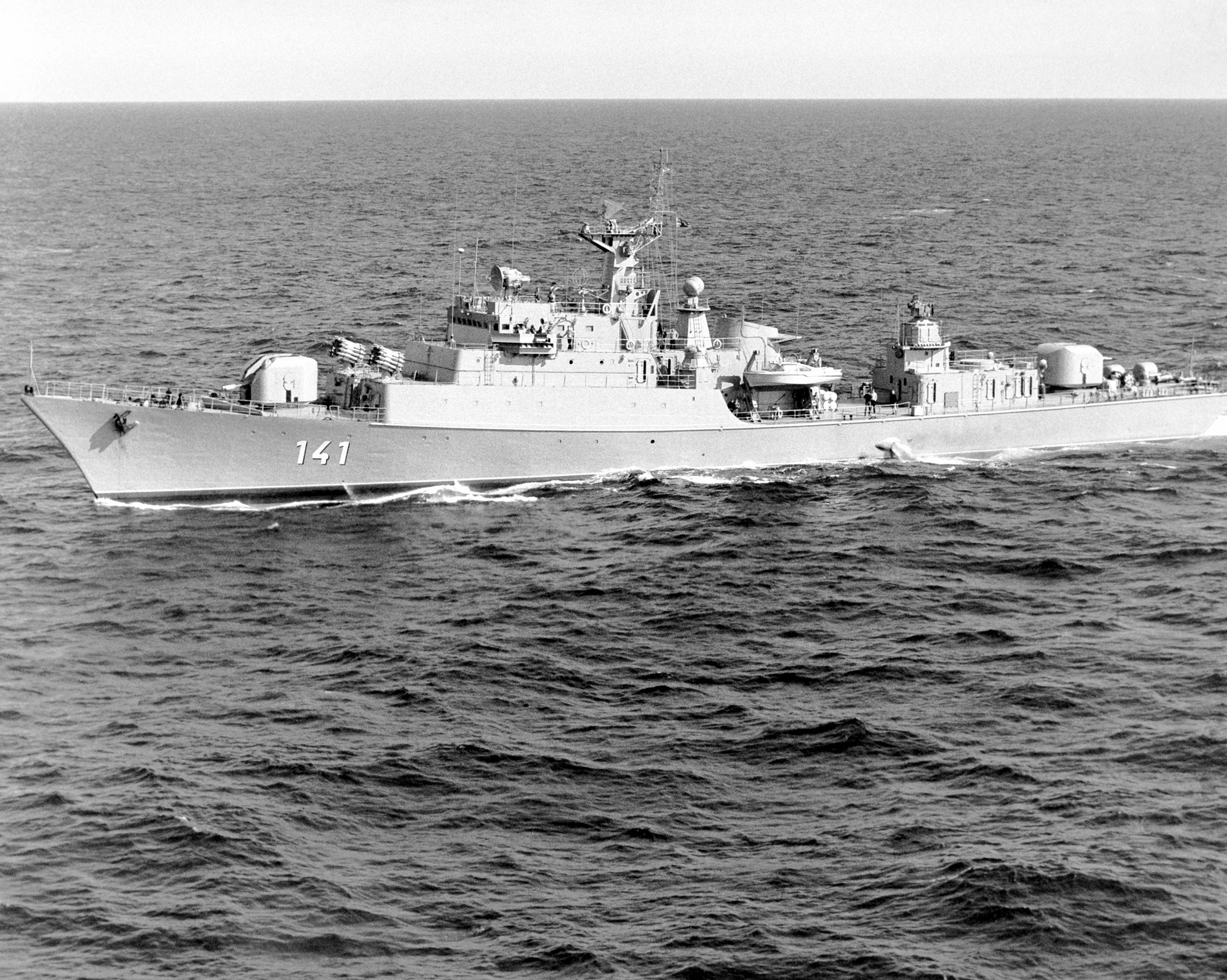
Rostock (East German Navy)

- Builders: Soviet Union (Zelenodolsk Shipyard in Zelenodolsk, Tatarstan)
- Type: Coastal anti-submarine warfare frigate
- Displacement: 1,900 tons
- Armament: 4 Styx SSM; 20 SA-N-4 SAM; 4 × 76 mm; 4 × 30 mm
- Powerplant: CODAG arrangement; 2 diesel engines; 1 gas turbine; 35,000 shp total power
- Speed: 27 knots
- Ships in class: 14 total: 6 Koni I and 8 Koni II
- Operator: Bulgarian Navy, Algerian National Navy, Cuban Revolutionary Navy, Libyan Navy,
- Commissioned: 1976
- Status: Most in active service

== Krivak (Project 1135 Burevestnik)-class frigate ==
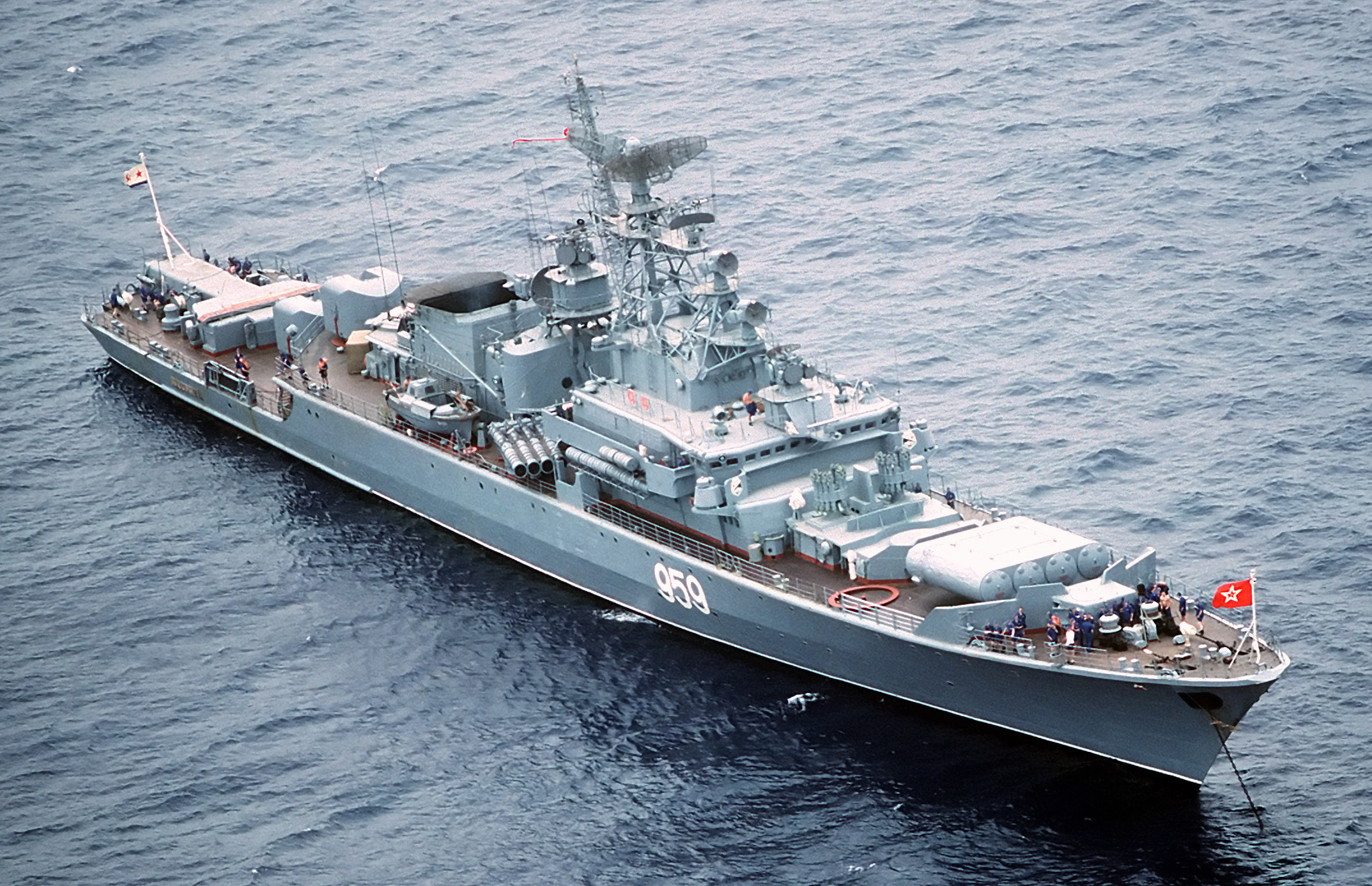
Zadornyy

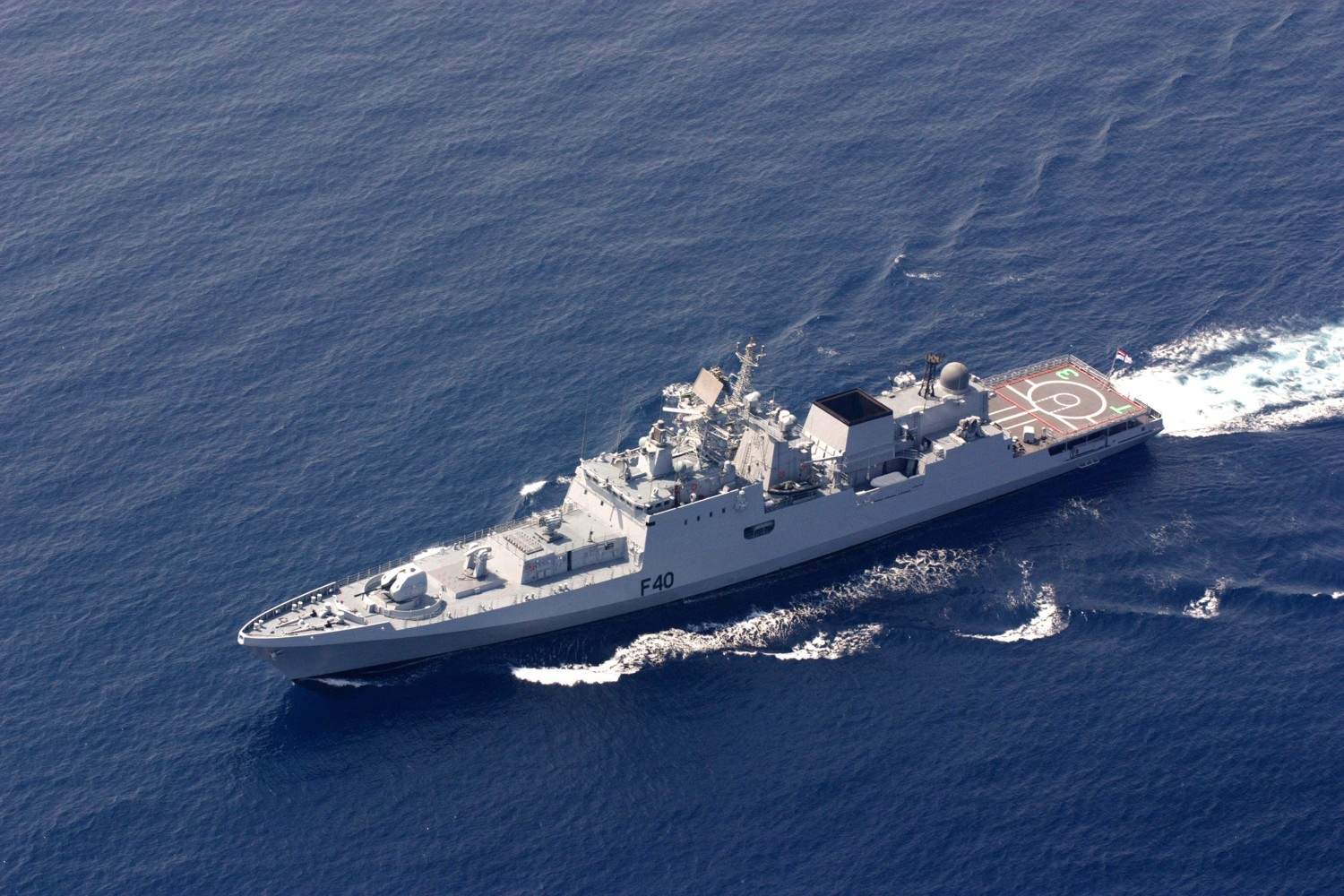
Talwar (Indian Navy)

- Builders: Soviet Union / Russia / Ukraine (Severnaya Verf 190 in St. Petersburg; Yantar Zavod in Kaliningrad; Zaliv Zavod in Kerch)
- Type:
  - Project 1135 Anti-submarine frigate (Russian designation 'patrol ship')
  - Project 11351 Border Guard Service of Russia
  - Project 11356 Frigate
- Displacement:
  - 3,575 tons (1135)
  - 3,830 tons (11351)
  - 4,035 tons (11356)
- Armament:
  - 4 × SSM; 40 × SS-N-4 SAM; 2 × 100 mm or 4 × 76 mm gun; 2 RPU-6000; 8 × 533 mm torpedoes; 16 mines (1135)
  - 1 х 100 mm gun, 2 х 6 30mm guns, 2 × 4 533 mm torpedo tubes, 2 × RBU-6000 Anti-Submarine rockets (11351)
  - 1 × 100 mm gun, two Kashtan CIWS systems, eight-cell VLS for 3M-54E Klub and BrahMos missiles, one 3S-90 launcher for 9M317 (SA-N-12) SAMs, eight Igla-1E (SA-16) SAMs, 1 × RBU-6000 rocket launcher, two twin 533 mm torpedo tubes (11356)
- Aircraft: 1 Kamov Ka-27 (11351 and 11356)
- Powerplant:
  - COGAG arrangement; 2 M8K and 2 M62 gas turbines; 2 shafts; 48,000 hp total power (1135)
  - 2 × DS-71 gas turbines and 2 × DT-59 boost turbines, driving two shafts (11356)
- Speed:
  - 30 knots (1135)
  - 32 (11356)
- Ships in class:
  - 32 (1135)
  - 8 (11351)
  - 4 + 5 laid down (11356)
- Operators:
  - Russian Navy : 2 (1135), 2 (11351), 3 (11356)
  - Ukrainian Navy : 1 (11351), stricken
  - Indian Navy : 6 (11356)
- Commissioned:
  - 1970 (1135)
  - 1984 (11351)
  - 2002 (11356)
- Status: total 13 in service

== La Fayette-class frigate ==
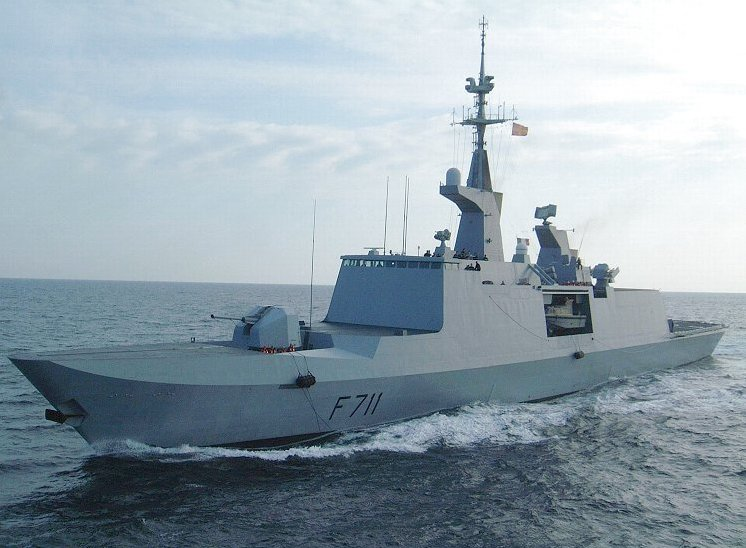
Surcouf

- Builders: France
- Type: Patrol frigate
- Displacement: 3,280 long tons (3,330 t)
- Aircraft: 1 Eurocopter Panther helicopter
- Armament: 8 Exocet SSM; 8 Crotale SAM; 1 × 100 mm gun; 2 × 20 mm guns
- Powerplant: 4 diesel engines; 2 shafts; 17,600 brake horsepower (13,100 kW) total power
- Speed: 25 knots (46 km/h)
- Range: 9,000 nautical miles (17,000 km) at economical speed, 12 knots (22 km/h)
- Ships in class: 14
- Operators: Marine Nationale, Royal Saudi Navy, Republic of China Navy
- Commissioned: 1995
- Status: In active service

== Leander-class frigate ==
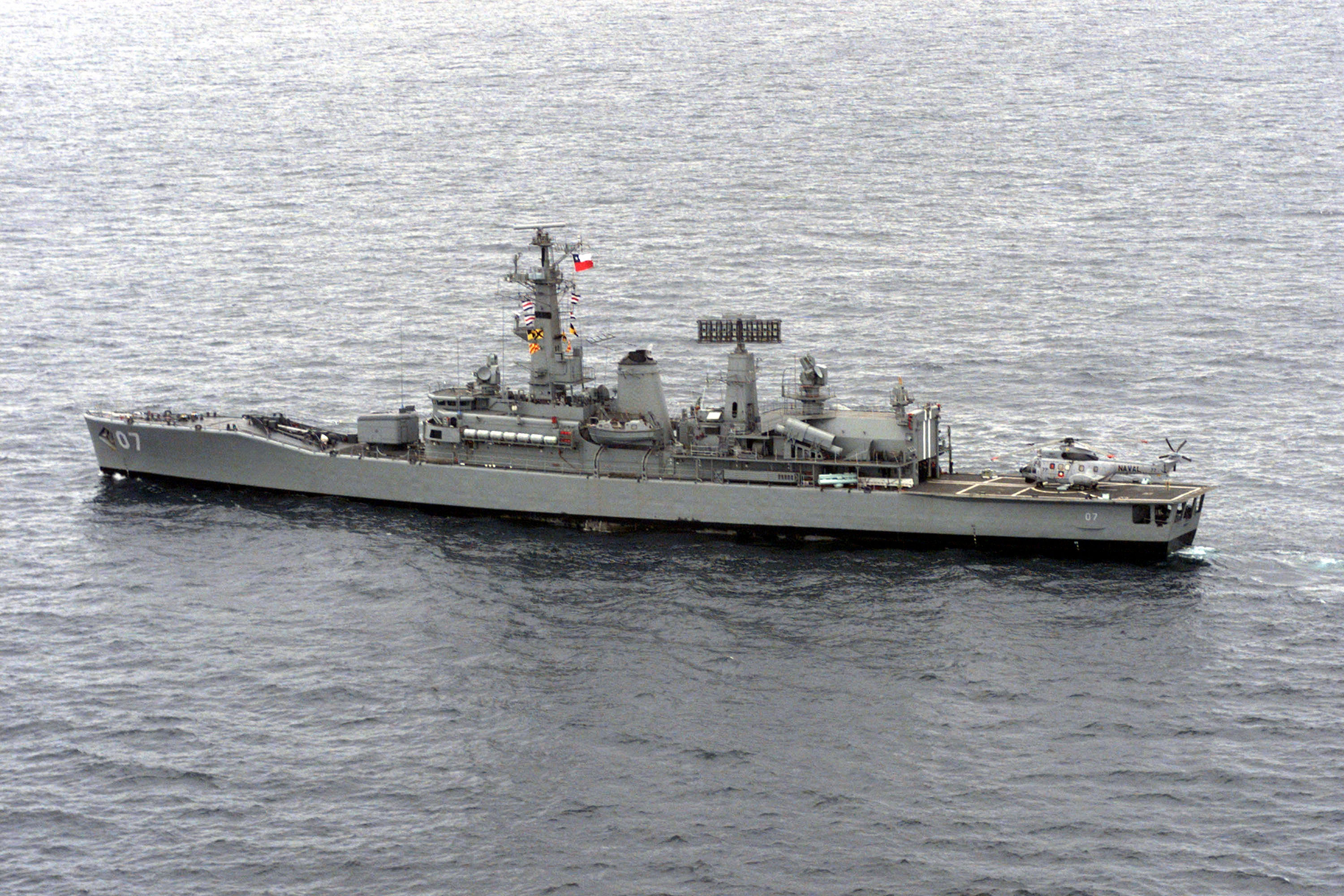
Almirante Lynch (Chilean Navy)

- Builders: United Kingdom, Australia, Netherlands
- Type: General-purpose frigate
- Displacement: 2,860 tons (Batch 1 & 2), 3,000 tons (Batch 3)
- Armament: Various configurations
- Powerplant: 2 steam turbines, 2 shafts, 25,000 shp
- Speed: 28 knots
- Ships in class: 46
- Operators: Ecuadorian Navy, Indonesian Navy
- Commissioned: 27 March 1963
- Status: 8 in active service, 15 sunk as reefs/targets, 16 scrapped, 7 decommissioned

== Legend–class cutter ==
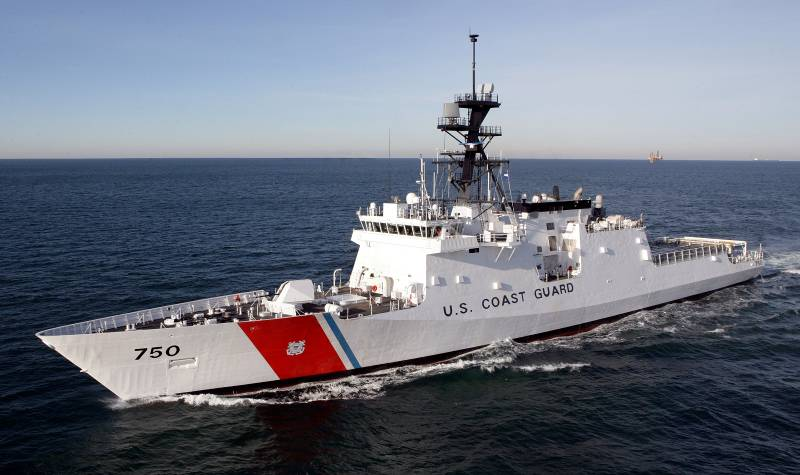
Bertholf

- Builders: United States (Ingalls Shipbuilding in Pascagoula)
- Type: National Security Cutter
- Displacement: 4,600 tons
- Armament:
  - 1 × Bofors 57 mm gun
  - 1 × 20 mm Phalanx CIWS
  - 4 × crew served .50 cal Browning M2 Machine Guns
  - 2 × crew served M240B 7.62 mm machine guns
  - Designed for, but not with:
    - Rim-115 Rolling Airframe Missile SeaRAM
    - Others
- Speed: 28 knots
- Ships in class: 8 active, 11 total planned
- Operator: United States Coast Guard
- Commissioned: 4 August 2008
- Status: In active service

== Lekiu-class frigate ==
- Builders: United Kingdom (Yarrow Shipbuilders in Glasgow)
- Type: Frigate
- Displacement: 2,270 tons
- Armament: 16 Seawolf SHORADS SAM, 8 MM40 Blk II Exocet SSM, 2 × B515 triple 12.75-inch torpedo for launching Whitehead 324 mm tubes, 1 Bofors 57 mm/70 dual-purpose guns, 2 MSI 30 mm AA guns,
- Powerplant: 4 × diesels driving 2 shafts, 16,000 bhp
- Speed: 28 knots
- Ships in class: 2
- Operator: Royal Malaysian Navy
- Commissioned: December 1994
- Status: 2 in active service

== Lupo-class frigate ==
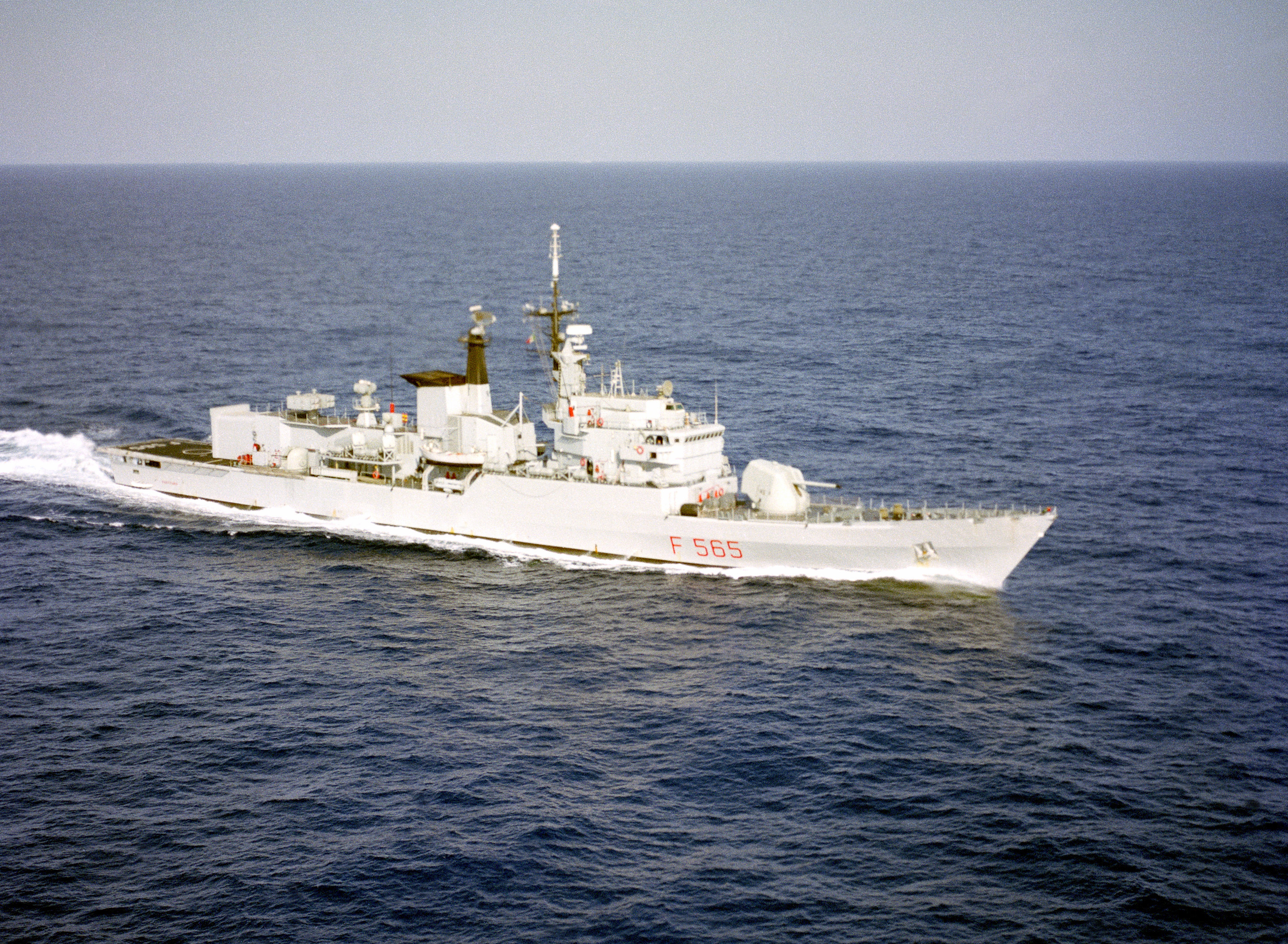
Sagittario

- Builders: Italy
- Type: Multi-role frigate
- Displacement: 2,525 tons
- Armament: 8 Otomat Mk 2 SSMs, • 8 Sea Sparrows SAMs, 1 OTO Melara 127/54 mm gun, 2 Breda-Bofors twin 40/70 mm guns, 2 Mark 32 triple torpedo tubes
- Powerplant: 2 General Electric / Fiat LM2500 gas turbines,2 GMT A230-20 diesel engines,
- Speed: 35 knots
- Ships in class: 14
- Operators: Peruvian Navy, Bolivarian Navy of Venezuela
- Commissioned: 1978
- Status: In active service

== Neustrashimy-class frigate ==
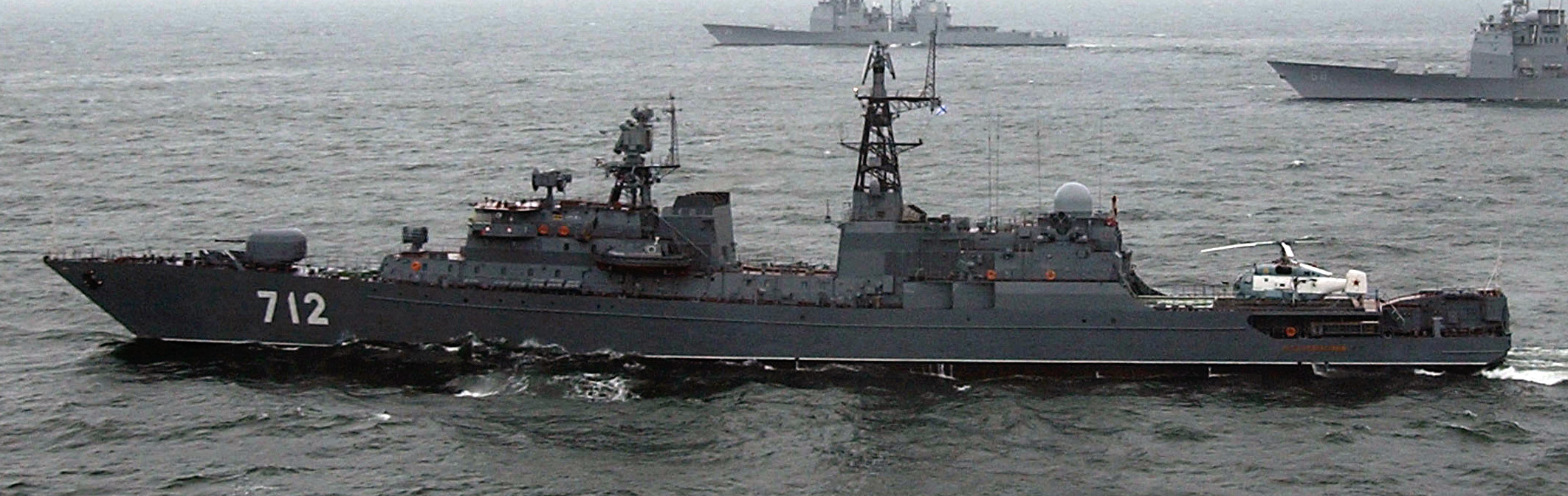
Neustrashimyy

- Builders: Russia (Yantar Baltic Shipbuilding in Kaliningrad)
- Type: Anti-submarine warfare frigate
- Displacement: 4,000 tons
- Aircraft: 1 Kamov Ka-27 helicopter
- Armament: 8 Kh-35 Uran SSM; 32 SA-N-9 SAM; 1 × 100 mm gun; 2 CIWS; 6 torpedo tubes
- Powerplant: COGAG arrangement; 4 gas turbines; 2 shafts; 57,000 shp total power
- Speed: 30 knots
- Ships in class: 3
- Operator: Russian Navy
- Commissioned: 1998
- Status: 2 in active service, 1 scrapped incomplete

== Nilgiri-class frigate ==
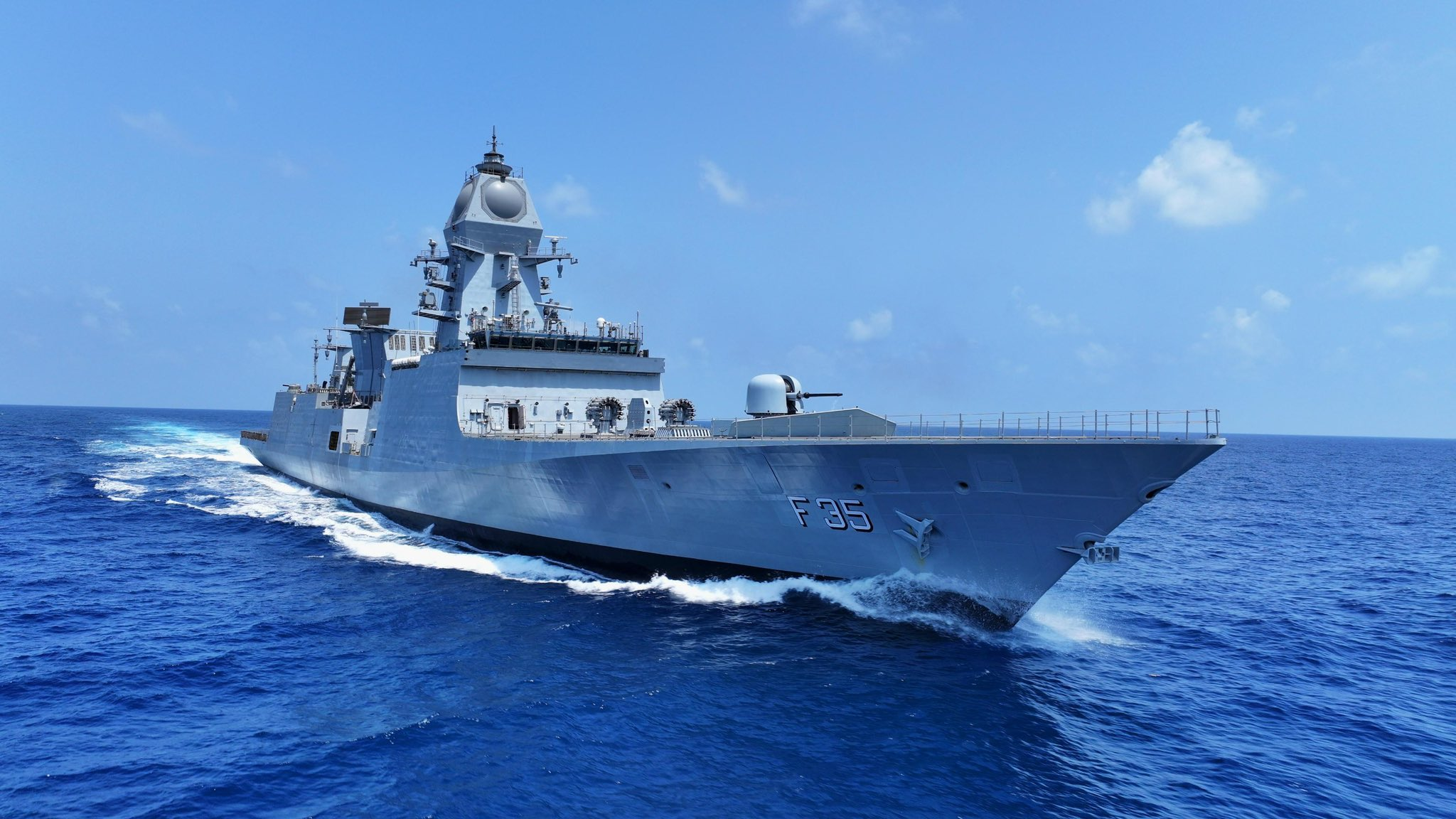
Udaygiri

- Builders: India (Mazagon Dock Shipbuilders, Garden Reach Shipbuilders & Engineers)
- Type: Stealth guided-missile frigate
- Displacement: 6,670 tons
- Aircraft: 1 × HAL Dhruv (or) Sea King Mk. 42B helicopters
- Armament: 4 × 8-cell VLS, for 32 Barak 8 surface-to-air missiles; 1 × 8-cell VLS, for 8 BrahMos anti-ship missiles; 2 × triple-tube torpedo launchers; 2 × RBU-6000 anti-submarine rocket launchers; 1 × OTO Melara 76 mm naval gun; 2 × AK-630M CIWS; 2 × OFT 12.7 mm M2 Stabilized Remote Controlled Gun
- Powerplant: 2 × General Electric LM2500 + 2 × MAN Diesel 12V28/33D STC
- Speed: 32 knots
- Ships in class: 7
- Operator: Indian Navy
- Commissioned: 15 January 2025
- Status: 6 in active service, 1 fitting out

== Niterói-class frigate ==
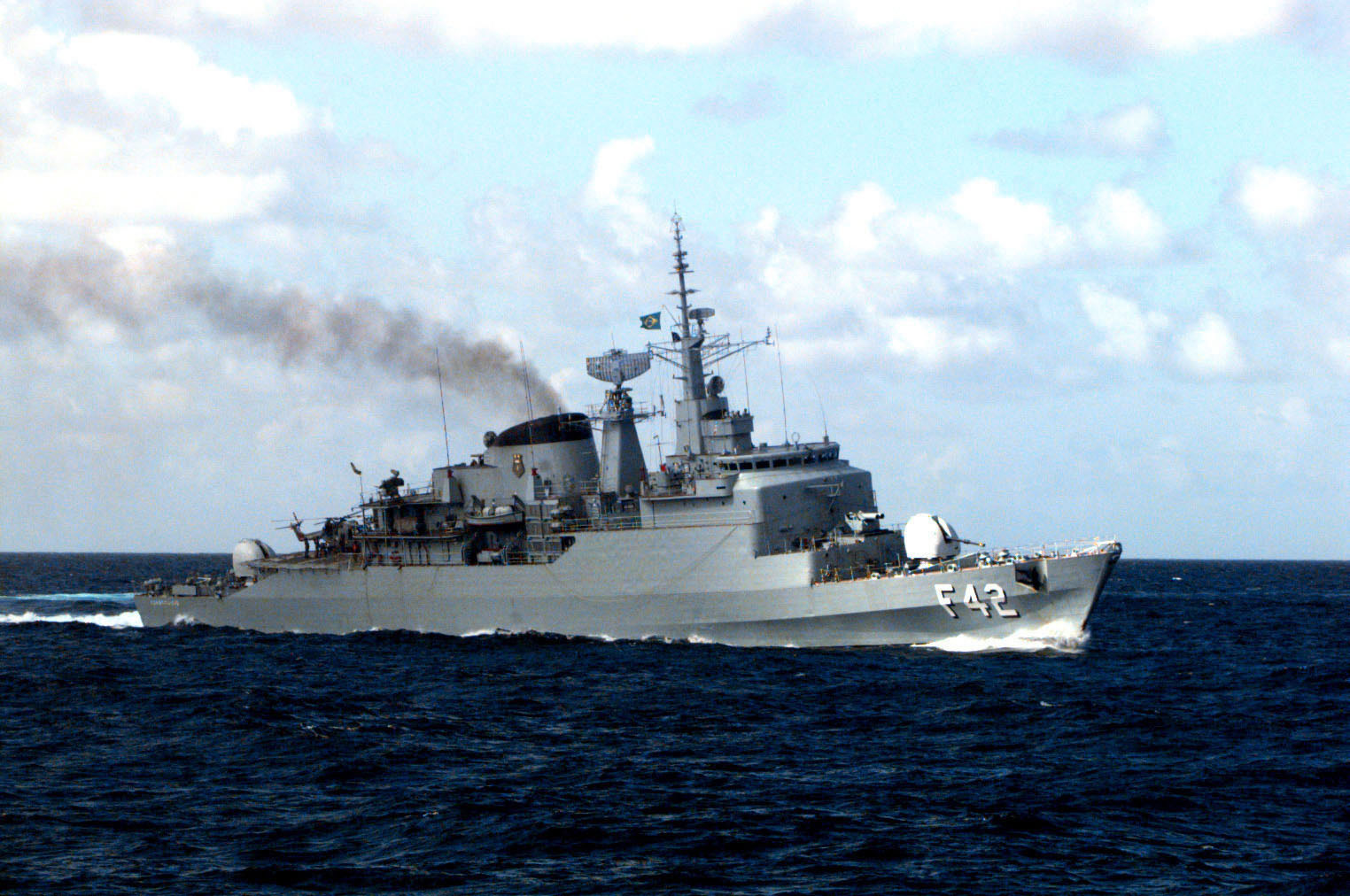
Constituição

- Builders: United Kingdom, Brazil
- Type: Multi-role frigate
- Displacement: 3,707 tons
- Armament: MM-40 Exocet SSM; ASPIDE SAM; 1 Vickers gun 4.5-inch Mk 8, 2 Bofors SAK 40 mm/70 AA; 2 x3 torpedo tubes for Mk 46 torpedoes; anti-submarine rocket launcher
- Powerplant: 2 Rolls-Royce Olympus gas turbines, 4 MTU Diesels
- Speed: 30 knots
- Ships in class: 6
- Operator: Brazilian Navy
- Commissioned: 20 November 1976
- Status: In active service

== Oliver Hazard Perry-class frigate ==
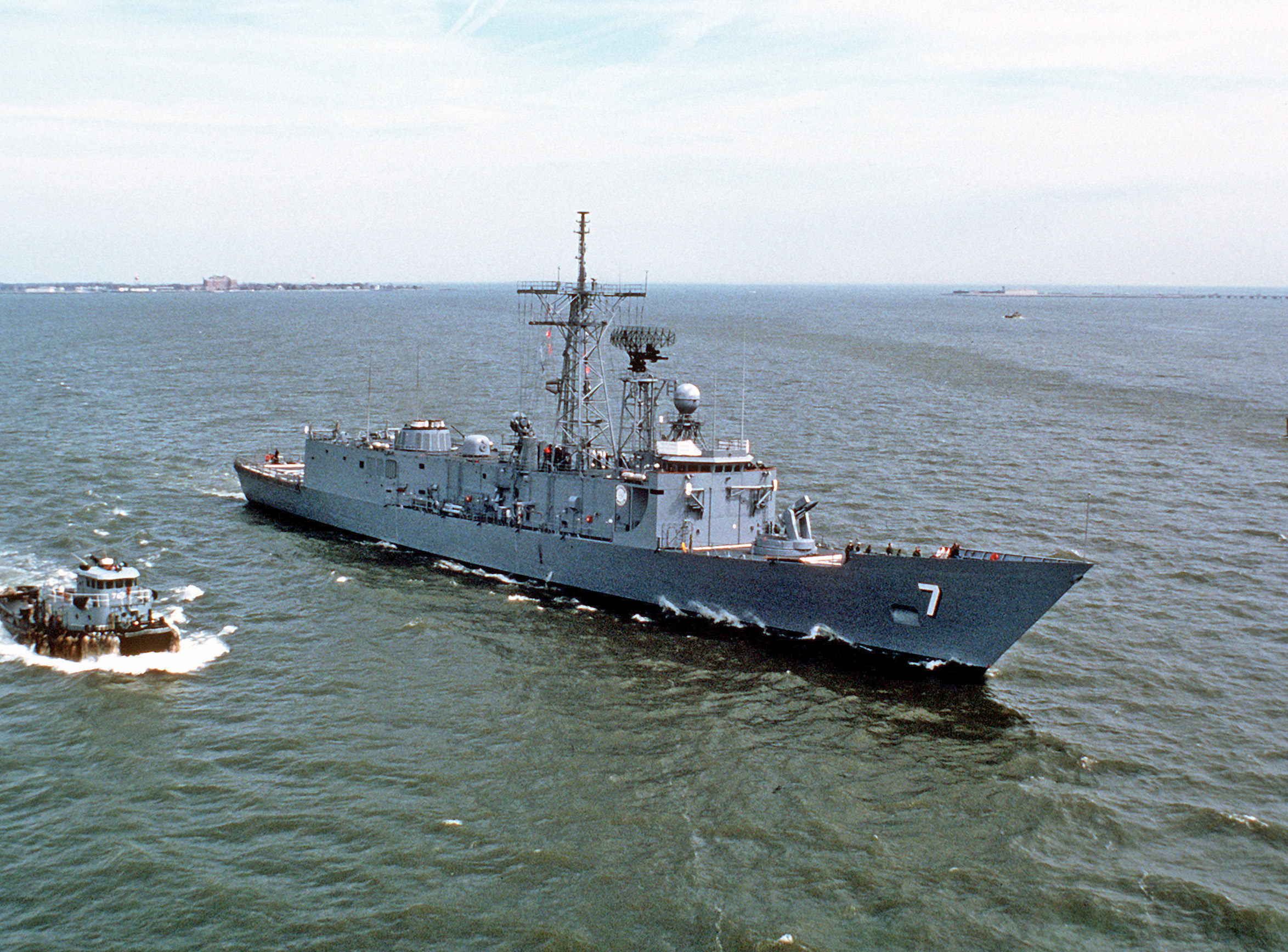
Oliver Hazard Perry

- Builders: United States (Bath Iron Works in Bath, Maine, Todd Pacific Shipyards in Seattle, Washington and San Pedro, California, Spain, in Bazan, Ferrol and Australia, AMECON Williamstown, Victoria
- Type: Multi-role guided-missile frigate
- Displacement: 4,100 tons
- Aviation: 2 SH-60 Seahawk helicopters
- Armament: 40 Harpoon SSM or SM-1MR SAM; 1 × 76 mm gun; 1 Phalanx CIWS; 6 torpedo tubes
- Powerplant: 2 LM2500 gas turbines; 1 shaft; 41,000 shp total power
- Speed: 30 knots
- Ships in class: 71
- Operators: Chilean Navy, Spanish Navy, Republic of China Navy, Polish Navy, Egyptian Navy, Royal Bahraini Naval Force, Turkish Navy, Pakistan Navy
- Commissioned: 17 December 1977
- Status: 56 retired (2021)

== Sachsen-class frigate ==
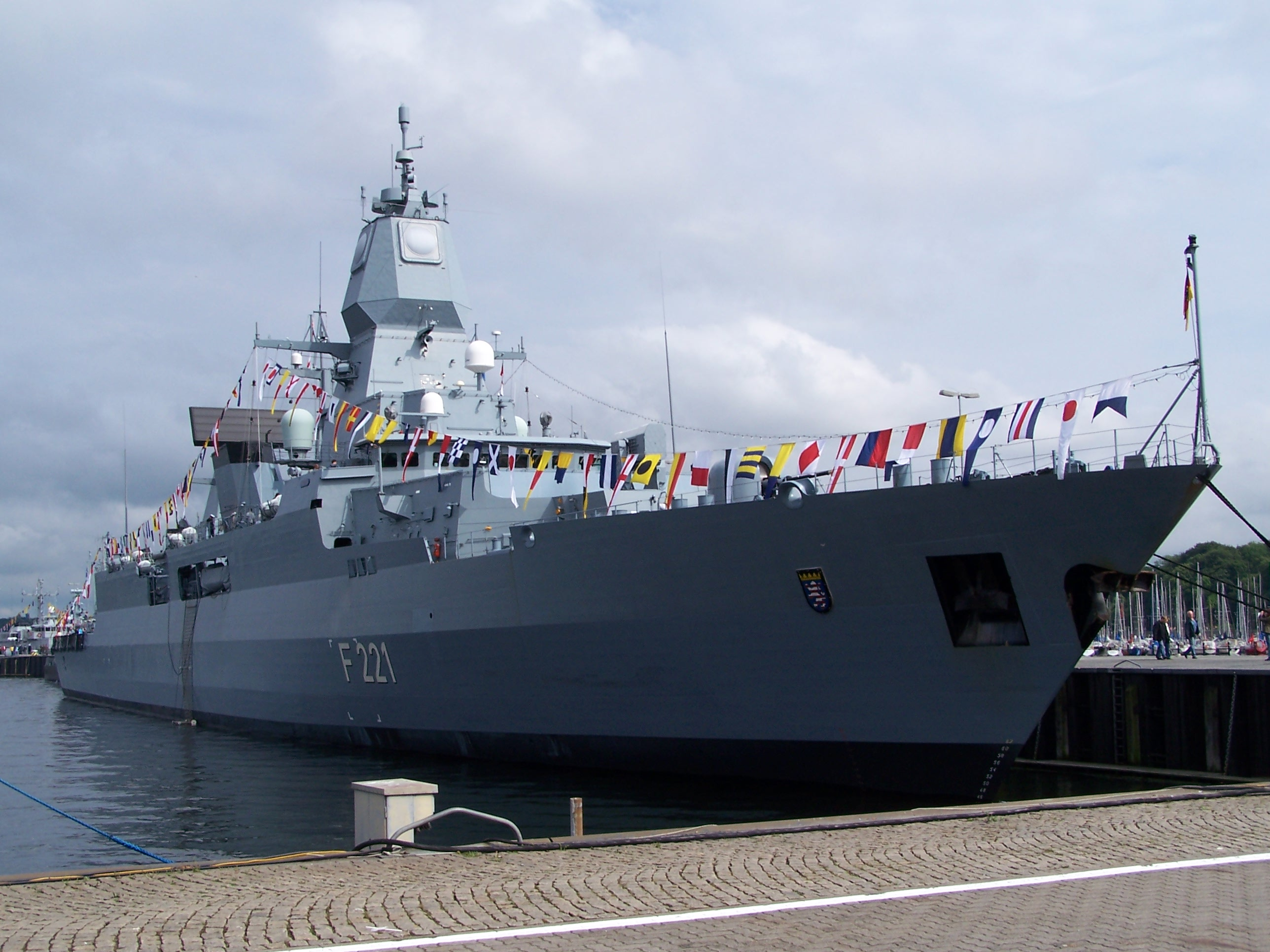
Hessen

- Builders: Germany
- Type: Air defense guided-missile frigate
- Displacement: 5,690 tons
- Aircraft: 2 Sea Lynx Mk 88A or 2 NH90 helicopters
- Armament: 1 VLS 32 ESSM and 24 SM-2 IIIA SAM, 2 RAM launchers with 21 SAM/CIWS-missiles each, 2 quadruple Harpoon SSM launcher, 1 Otobreda 76 mm dual-purpose gun, 2 Mauser MLG 27 27 mm autocannons, 2 triple torpedo launchers with EuroTorp MU90 Impact torpedoes
- Powerplant: 2 MTU V20 diesel engines, 1 General Electric LM2500 gas turbine, 2 shafts
- Speed: 29 knots
- Ships in class: 3
- Operator: German Navy
- Commissioned: 2004–2006
- Status: In active service

== Shivalik-class frigate ==
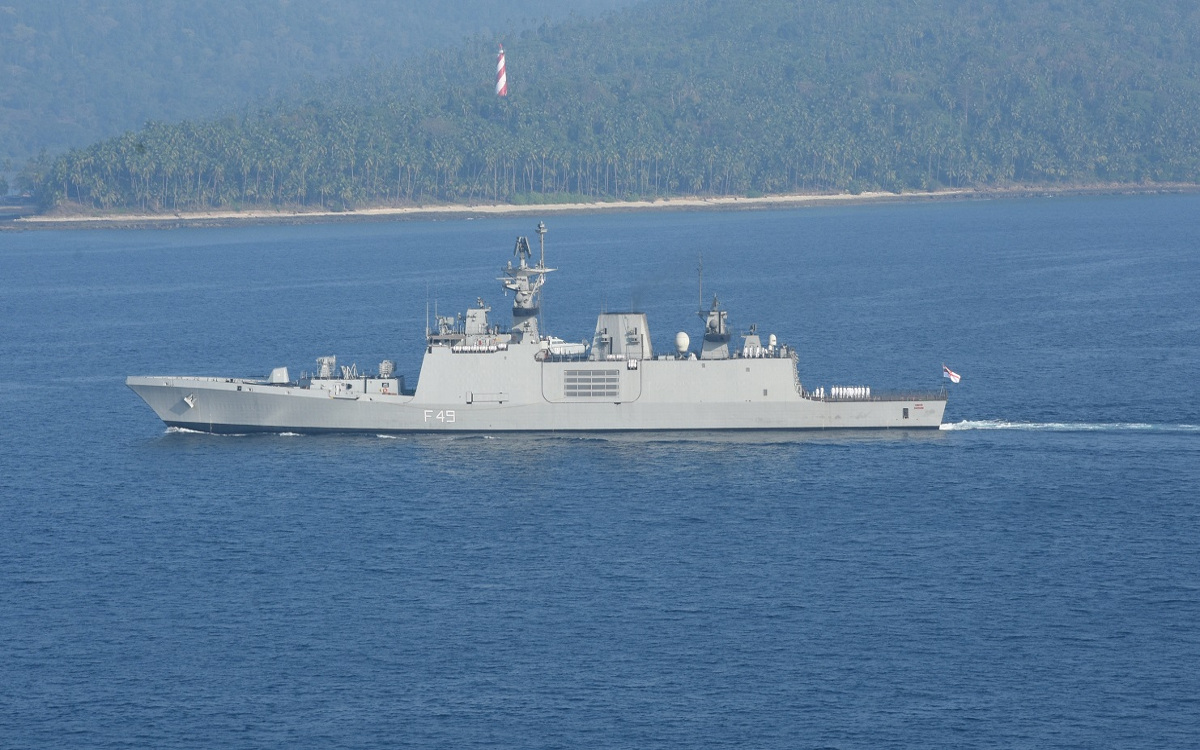
Sahyadri

- Builders: India (Mazagon Dock Limited)
- Type: Guided-missile stealth frigate
- Displacement: 6,200 tons
- Aircraft: 2 × HAL Dhruv or Sea King Mk 42B helicopters.
- Armament: 1 × 3.0-inch Otobreda naval gun; 8 × VLS launched Klub anti-ship cruise missiles or 8 × VLS launched BrahMos anti-ship cruise missiles; 2 × 2 DTA-53-956 torpedo launchers; 2 × RBU-6000 (RPK-8) rocket launchers; Shtil-1 missile system with 24 short to medium range (30 km) missiles; Barak SAM-launcher CIWS; 2 × AK-630 CIWS
- Powerplant: 2 × Pielstick 16 PA6 STC Diesel engines 2 × GE LM2500+ boost turbines in CODOG configuration
- Speed: 32 knots (22 in diesel)
- Ships in class: 3
- Operator: Indian Navy
- Commissioned: 2010
- Status: In active service

== Thetis-class ocean patrol vessels ==
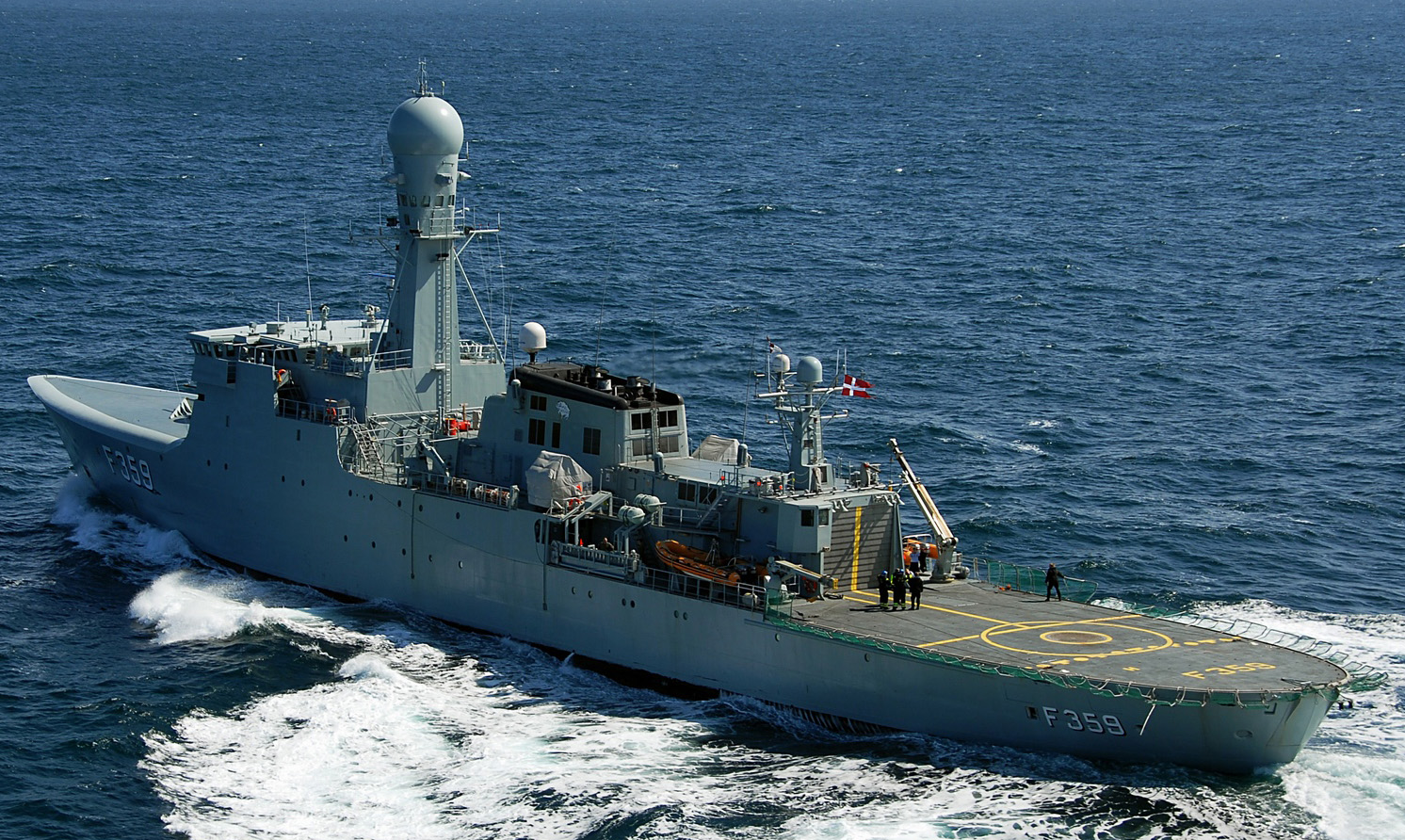
Vædderen

- Builders: Denmark (StanFlex)
- Type: Multi-role ocean patrol vessel
- Displacement: 3,500 tons
- Aircraft: 1 Lynx helicopter
- Armament: 1 × 76 mm gun; 1 × 20 mm gun; 2 depth charge racks; modular additional weapon options
- Powerplant: 3 diesel engines; 1 shaft; 6,366 hp total power
- Speed: 21 knots
- Ships in class: 4
- Operator: Royal Danish Navy
- Commissioned: 1991
- Status: In active service
- Note: Also known as StanFlex 3000 or IS86 class

== Type 053H, 053H1, 053H2, 053H1Q, 053H1G frigate (NATO codename Jianghu I, II, III, IV, V) ==
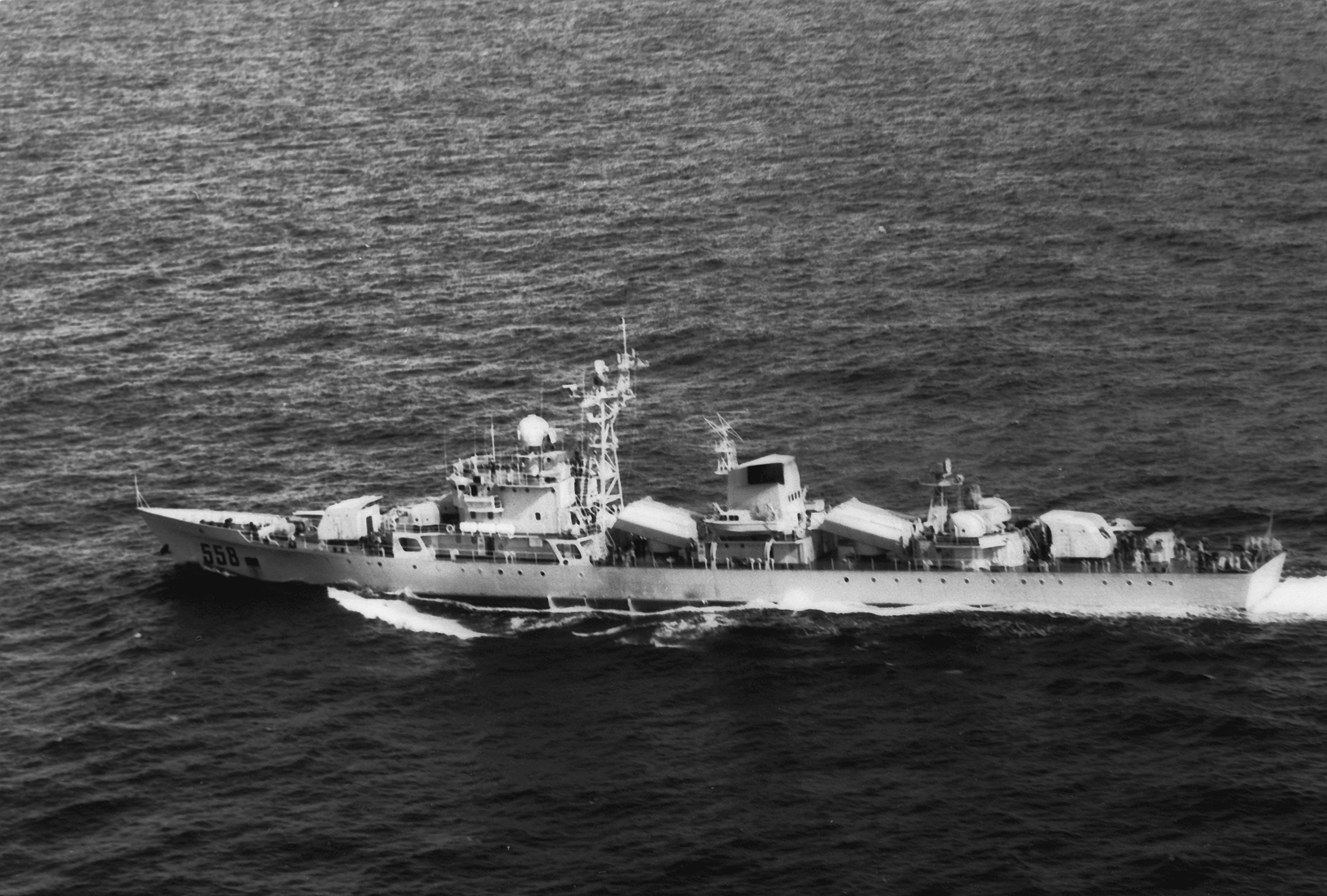
Beihai

- Builders: China (Jiangnan Shipyard and Hudong Shipyard in Shanghai)
- Type: Patrol frigate
- Displacement: 1,800 tons
- Armament: 2–8 × C-201 or C-801 SSM; 2 × 100 mm guns; 4–8 × 37 mm guns
- Powerplant: 4 MTU diesel engines; 2 shafts; 26,500 hp total power
- Speed: 28 knots
- Range: 3,500 nmi at 18 knots
- Ships in class: 39 total: 14 Jianghu I, 9 Jianghu II, 3 Jianghu III, 1 Jianghu IV, 6 Jianghu V, 6 export version
- Operators: Royal Thai Navy, Bangladesh Navy, Myanmar Navy
- Commissioned: 1976
- Status: Most in active service, 7 retired

== Type 053H3 frigate (NATO codename Jiangwei II) ==
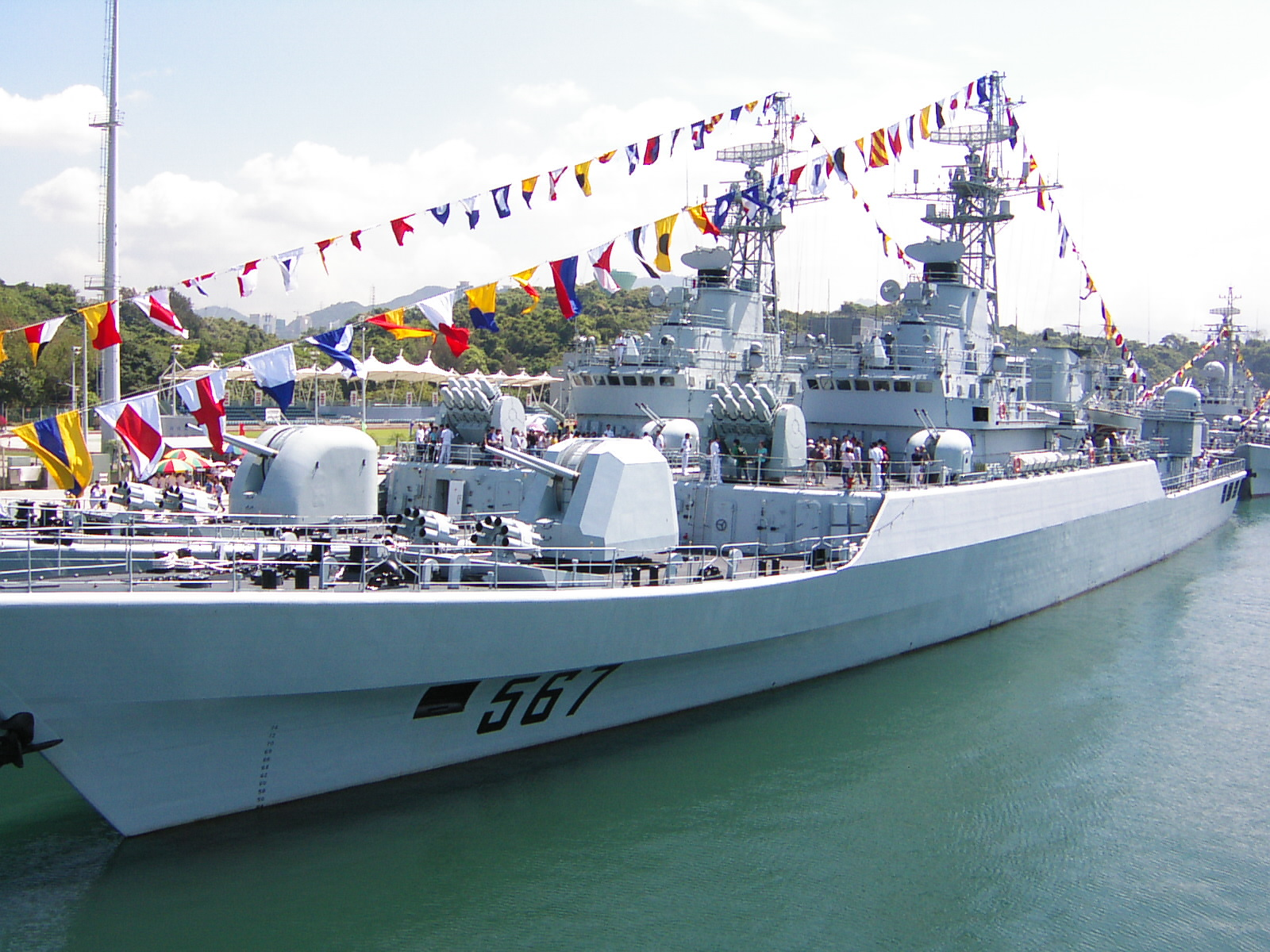
Xiangfan

- Builders: China (Hudong Shipyard in Shanghai and Huangpo Shipyard in Guangzhou)
- Type: Multi-role guided-missile frigate
- Displacement: 2,250–2,393 tons
- Aircraft: 1 Harbin Z-9 helicopter
- Armament: 8 × YJ-83 SSM; 8 × HQ-7 SAM; 4 × dual-37 mm guns; 1 × dual-100 mm gun; 2 × 6-tube ASW rocket launchers; 6 × torpedo launchers; 2 × 15-barrel decoy rocket launchers; 2 × DC racks & launcher
- Powerplant: 4 diesel engines; 2 shafts; 22,840 bhp total power
- Speed: 28 knots
- Range: 4,000 nmi at 18 knots
- Ships in class: 14
- Operator: People's Liberation Army Navy, Bangladesh Navy, Pakistan Navy (F-22P Zulfiquar class)
- Commissioned: 1999
- Status: In active service

== Type 054 frigate (NATO codename Jiangkai I) ==
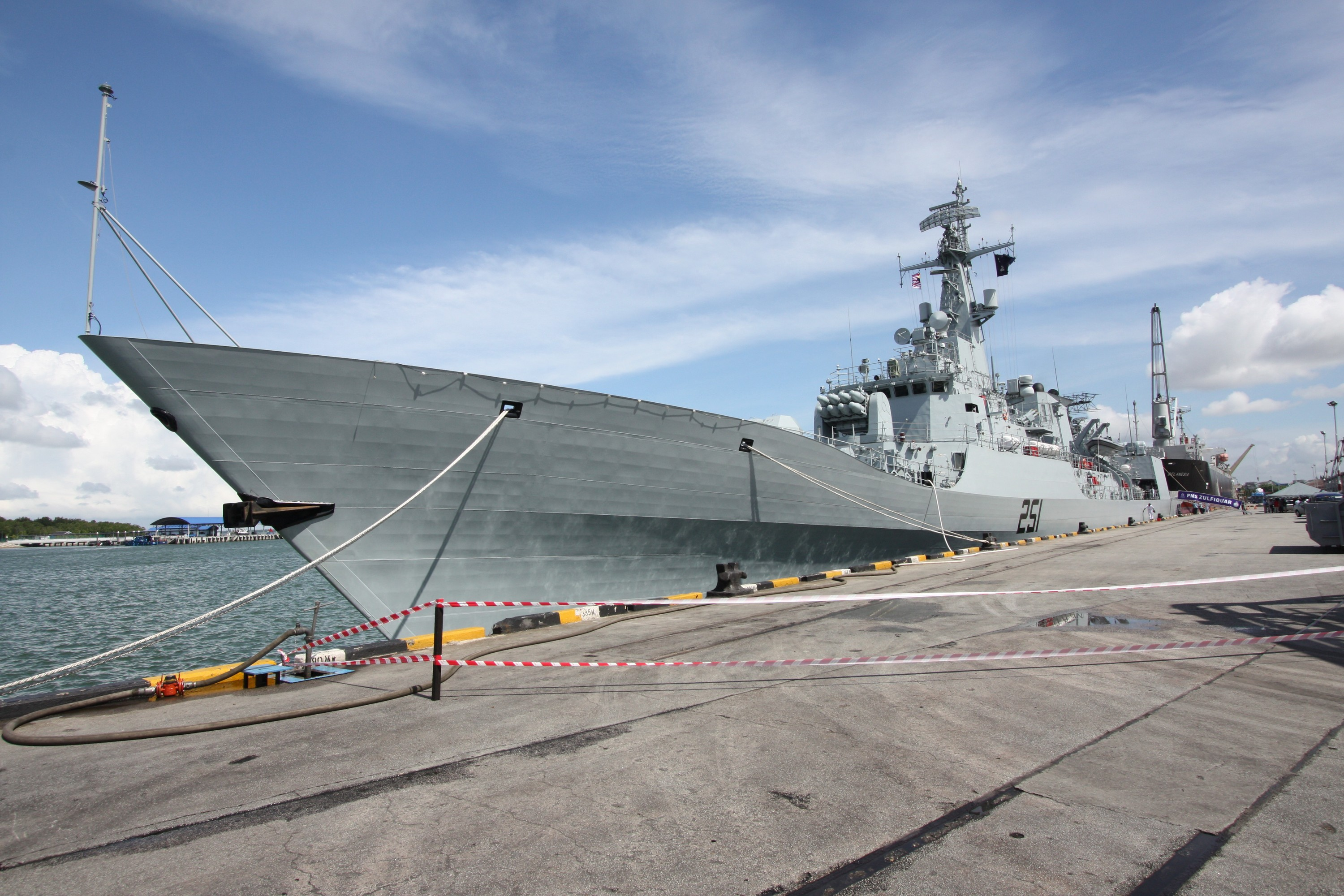
Zulfiqaur

- Builders: China (Hudong Shipyard in Shanghai and Huangpu Shipyard in Guangzhou)
- Type: Multi-role guided-missile frigate
- Displacement: 3,000–4,300 tons (estimated)
- Aircraft: 1 Z-9 or Kamov Ka-28 helicopter
- Armament: 2 × 4 YJ-83 (C-803) SSM; 1 × HQ-7 8-cell SAM; 1 × 100 mm gun; 4 × AK-630 37 mm CIWS; 2 × triple 324mm YU-7 ASW torpedoes; 2 × rocket launchers, possibly ASW rockets or decoy rockets
- Powerplant: 2 French SEMT Pielstick diesels, 21,000 hp, 2 MTU Friedrichshafen 20V 956TB92, 8,840 hp
- Speed: 25–30 knots
- Ships in class: 2: Ma'anshan (525), Wenzhou (526)
- Operator: People's Liberation Army Navy
- Commissioned: February 2005
- Status: In active service

== Type 054A frigate (NATO codename Jiangkai II) ==
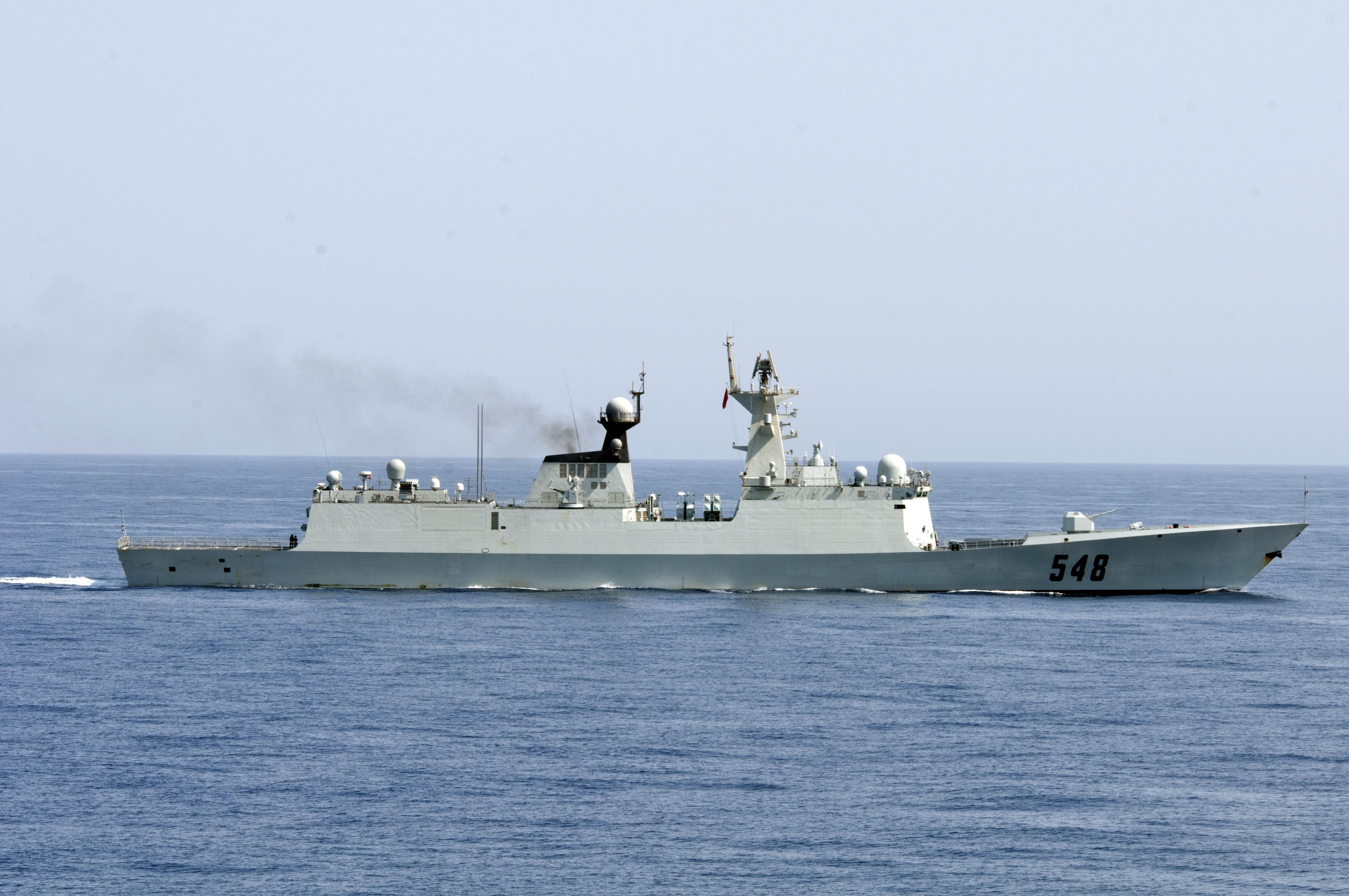
Yiyang

- Builders: China (Hudong Shipyard in Shanghai and Huangpu Shipyard in Guangzhou)
- Type: Multi-role guided-missile frigate
- Displacement: 3,600–4,053 tons (estimated)
- Aircraft: 1 Z-9 or Kamov Ka-28 helicopter
- Armament: 2 × 4 YJ-83 (C-803) SSM; 1 × HQ-16 32-cell VLS SAM; 1 × 76 mm dual-purpose gun; 2 × Type 730 7-barrel 30 mm CIWS; 2 × triple 324mm YU-7 ASW torpedoes; 2 × 6 Type 87 240mm anti-submarine rocket launcher (36 rockets carried); 2 × Type 726-4 18-tube decoy rocket launchers
- Powerplant: 4 Shaanxi/SEMT Pielstick diesels
- Speed: 27 knots (estimated)
- Ships in class: 31
- Operators: People's Liberation Army Navy, Pakistan Navy
- Commissioned: January 2008
- Status: In active service

== Type 21 frigate ==
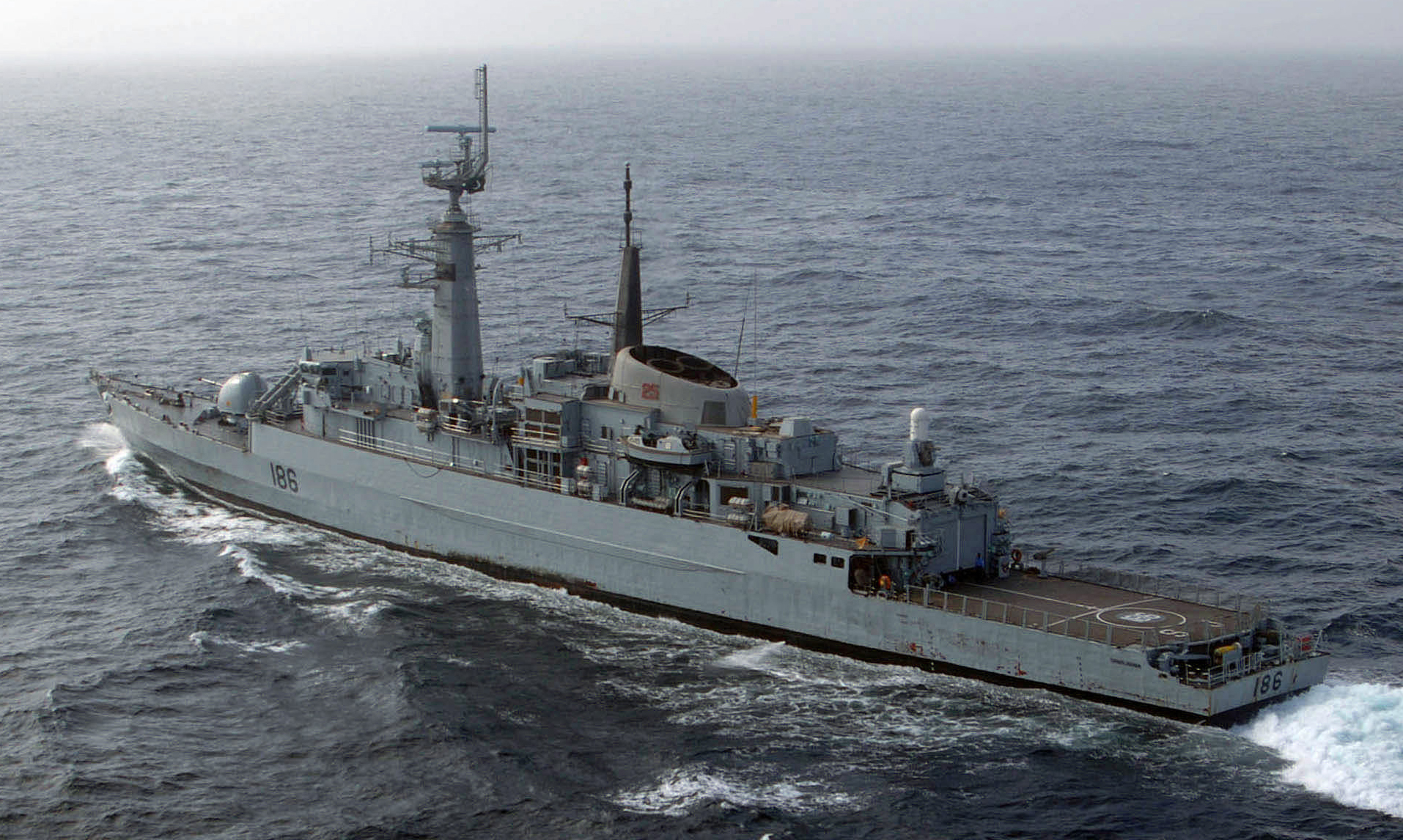
Shahjahan (Pakistani Navy)

- Builders: United Kingdom
- Type: General-purpose frigate
- Displacement: 2,860 tons
- Armament: (Pakistani modifications) 1 × 4.5 in Vickers Mark 8 gun; 4 × 20 mm Oerlikon; Harpoon SSM; LY-60N SAM; 2 × 12.75" 3-tube STWS-1 torpedo tubes
- Powerplant: 2 Tyne cruise turbines, 2 Olympus boost turbines, 2 shafts
- Speed: 30 knots
- Ships in class: 8
- Operators: Pakistan Navy
- Commissioned: 11 May 1974
- Status: 6 In active service, 2 sunk

== Type 22 frigate ==
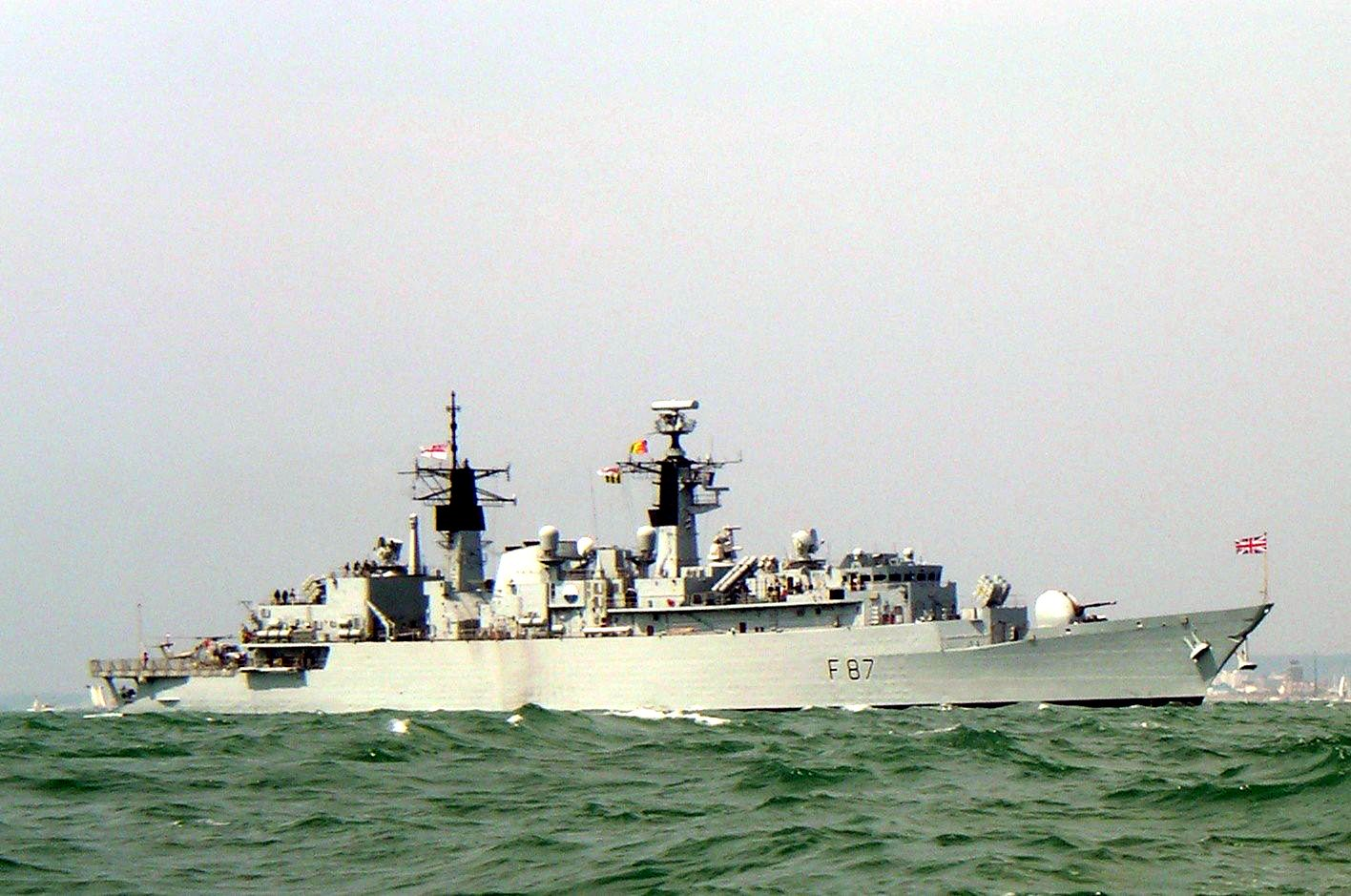
Chatham

- Builders: United Kingdom
- Type: Anti-submarine frigate
- Displacement: Batch 1: 4,400 tons; Batch 2: 4,800 tons; Batch 3: 4,900 tons
- Armament: (Batch 3) 2 quadruple Harpoon launchers, 2 GWS 25 Mod 3 Seawolf anti-missile missile systems, 4.5 in (110 mm) gun, 2 20 mm guns (after refit), Goalkeeper CIWS, 2 triple torpedo tubes
- Powerplant: 2 Rolls-Royce Olympus TM3B high-speed gas turbines and 2 Rolls-Royce Tyne RM1A cruise gas turbines
- Speed: 30 knots (56 km/h)
- Ships in class: 14 total: 4 Batch I, 6 Batch II, 4 Batch 3
- Operators: Brazilian Navy, Chilean Navy, Romanian Naval Forces
- Commissioned: 2 May 1979
- Status: 6 in active service, 8 disposed (2 sunk as targets, 6 scrapped)

== Type 23 frigate ==
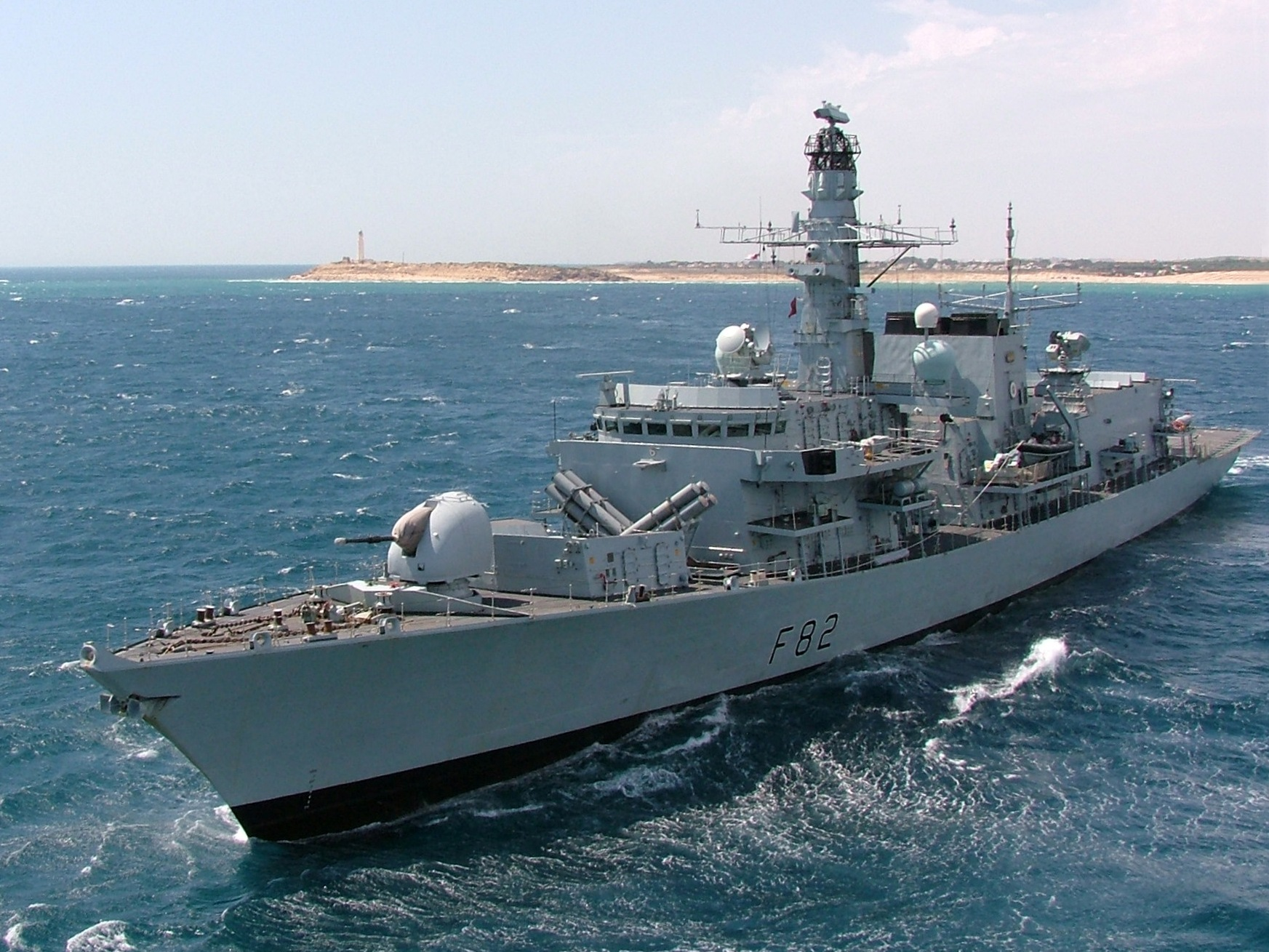
Somerset

- Builders: United Kingdom
- Type: Multi-role frigate
- Displacement: 4,900 tons
- Armament: 2 × quadruple Harpoon, 32 × Sea Wolf SAM, 1 × 114 mm Vickers Mark 8 gun, 2 × Oerlikon 30 mm guns, 4 × fixed torpedo tubes, Marconi Sting Ray NATO Seagnat, Type 182 and DLF3 countermeasures launchers
- Propulsion: CODLAG, 2 × Rolls-Royce gas turbines, 4 × diesel engines, 2 × GEC electric motors
- Speed: 28 knots
- Ships in class: 16
- Operators: Royal Navy, Chilean Navy
- Commissioned: 1 June 1990
- Status: In active service – 8 Royal Navy, 3 Chilean Navy (5 Royal Navy vessels retired/inactive)

== Ulsan-class frigate ==
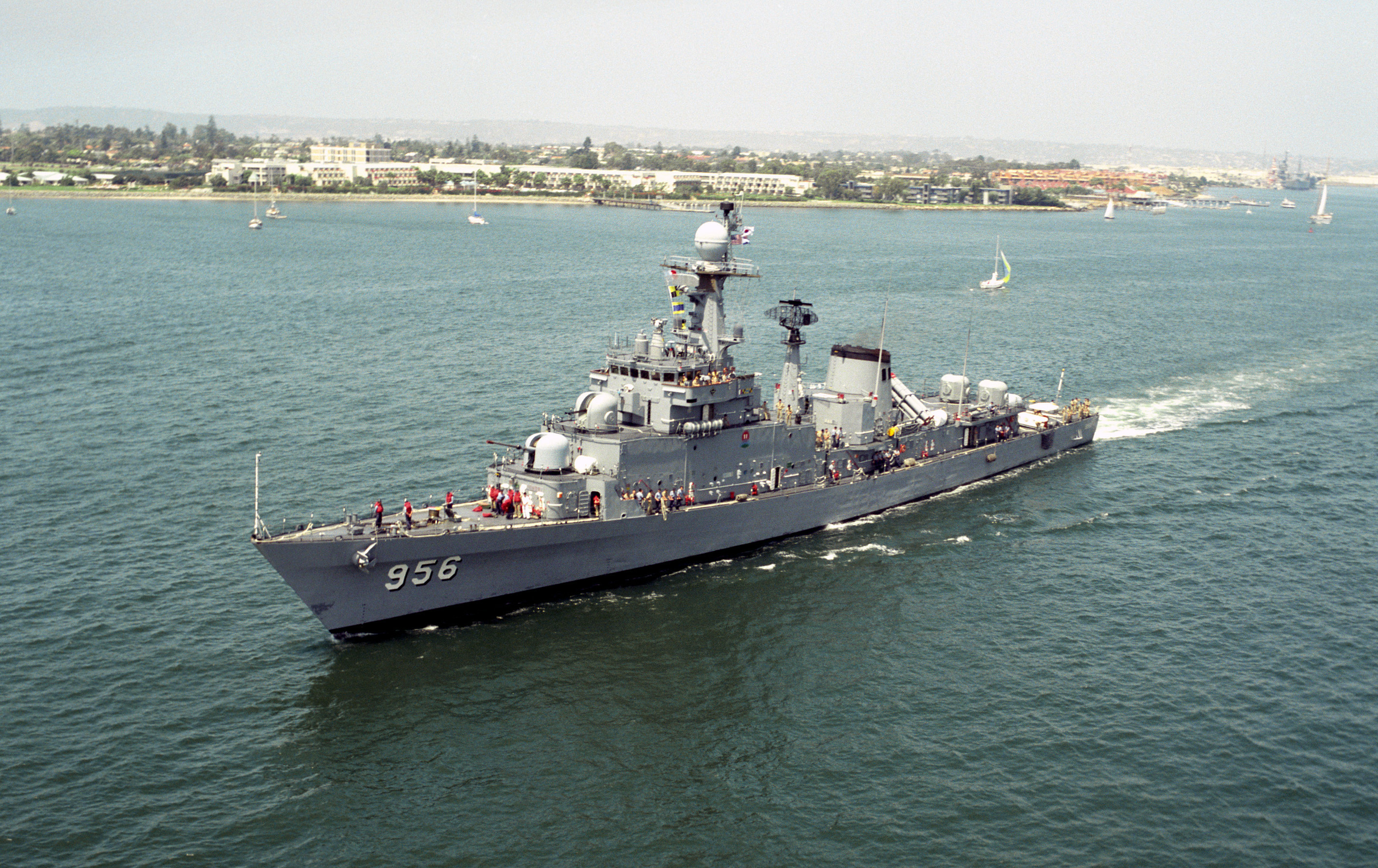
Kyongbuk

- Builders: South Korea
- Type: Multi-purpose frigate
- Displacement: 2,350 tons
- Armament: 2 OTO Mellara (76mm)/62 compact, 4 Emerson Electric 30 mm (951–955), 3 Breda 40 mm/70(956–961), 8 RGM-84D Harpoon SSM, 1 Raytheon VLS – Mk 48 Mod 2, 5 triple torpedo tubes
- Powerplant: CODOG 2 General Electric LM-2500 Diesel Engine, 2 MTU 538 TB 82
- Speed: 34 knots
- Range: 8,000 at 16 knots
- Ships in class: 9 (3 in final weapons fitment)
- Operators: Republic of Korea Navy, Bangladesh Navy
- Commissioned: 1 January 1984
- Status: In active service

== Valour (MEKO A-200)-class frigate ==
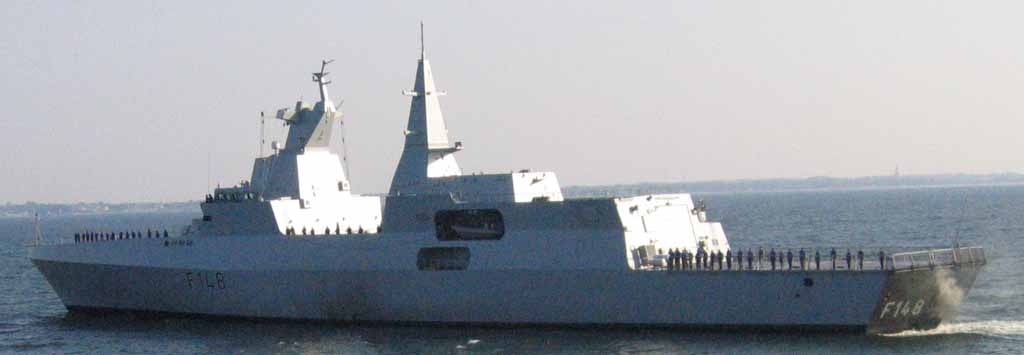
Mendi

- Builders: Germany (Blohm + Voss in Hamburg)
- Type: Air defense frigate
- Displacement: 3,700 tons
- Aircraft: 1 SuperLynx helicopter
- Armament: 8 Exocet MM40 SSM; 16 Umkhonto SAM; 1 × 76 mm gun; 2 × 35 mm guns; 2 × 20 mm guns; 4 torpedo tubes
- Powerplant: CODAG WARP arrangement; 1 LM2500 gas turbine, 2 MTU 16V 1163 TB93 diesels, 1 LIPS LJ210E waterjet; 42,922 hp total power
- Speed: 27 knots
- Range: 8,000 at 16 knots
- Ships in class: 4
- Operator: South African Navy
- Commissioned: 2006
- Status: In active service

== Vasco da Gama-class frigate ==
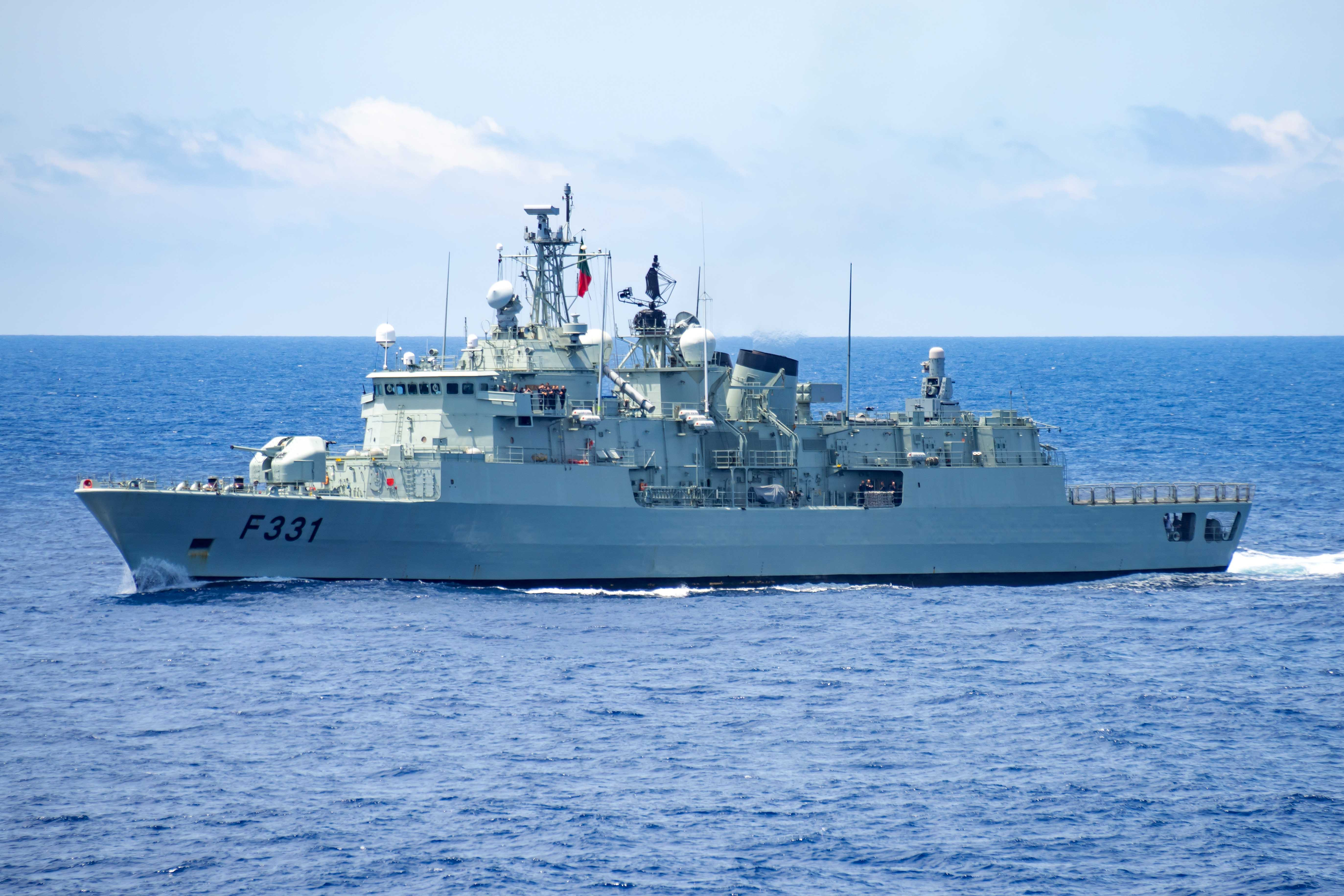
Álvares Cabral

- Builders: Germany
- Type: Multi-role frigate
- Displacement: 3,200 tons
- Armament: 100 mm Mod68 CADAM polyvalent artillery piece, 1 Phalanx CIWS, 2 × 3 12.75-inch Mk 32 torpedo tubes, 2 Mk 141 quad-pack Launcher for RGM-84 Harpoon, 1 Mk 21 Guided Missile Launching System for 8 RIM-7 Sea Sparrow
- Powerplant: 2 General Electric LM2500 gas turbines
- Speed: 32 knots
- Ships in class: 3
- Operator: Portuguese Navy
- Commissioned: 19 January 1991
- Status: In active service

== Wielingen-class frigate ==
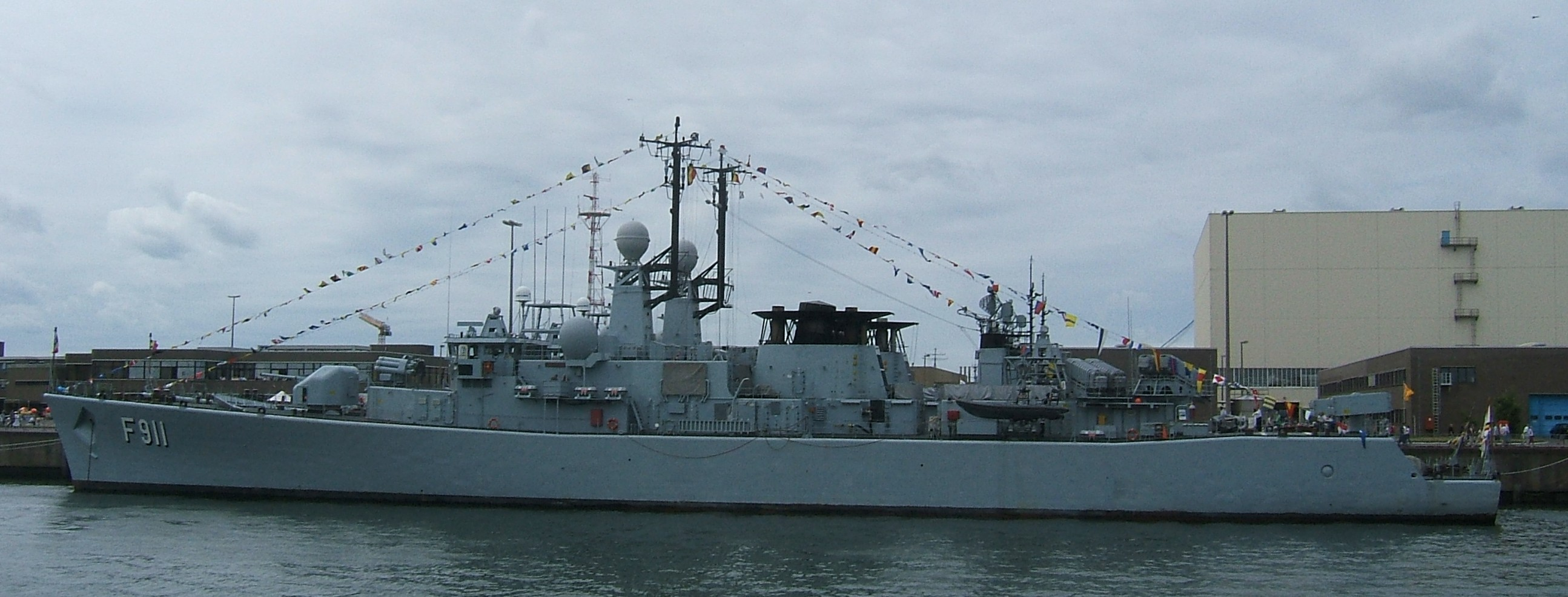
Westdiep

- Builders: Belgium (Boel in Temse and Cockerill in Antwerp)
- Type: Anti-submarine warfare and escort frigate
- Displacement: 2,200 tons
- Armament: 4 Exocet SSM; 8 Sea Sparrow SAM; 1 × 100 mm gun; 6 anti-submarine rockets; 2 L5 torpedo tubes
- Powerplant: CODOG arrangement; 2 Cockerill diesel engines; 1 Rolls-Royce Olympus gas turbine
- Speed: 28 knots (52 km/h)
- Range: 6,000 nautical miles (11,000 km) at 16 knots (30 km/h)
- Ships in class: 4
- Operators: Bulgarian Navy
- Commissioned: 1978
- Status: 1 stricken in 1993, 3 sold to Bulgaria in 2005 and in active Bulgarian service

== Sigma-class frigate ==
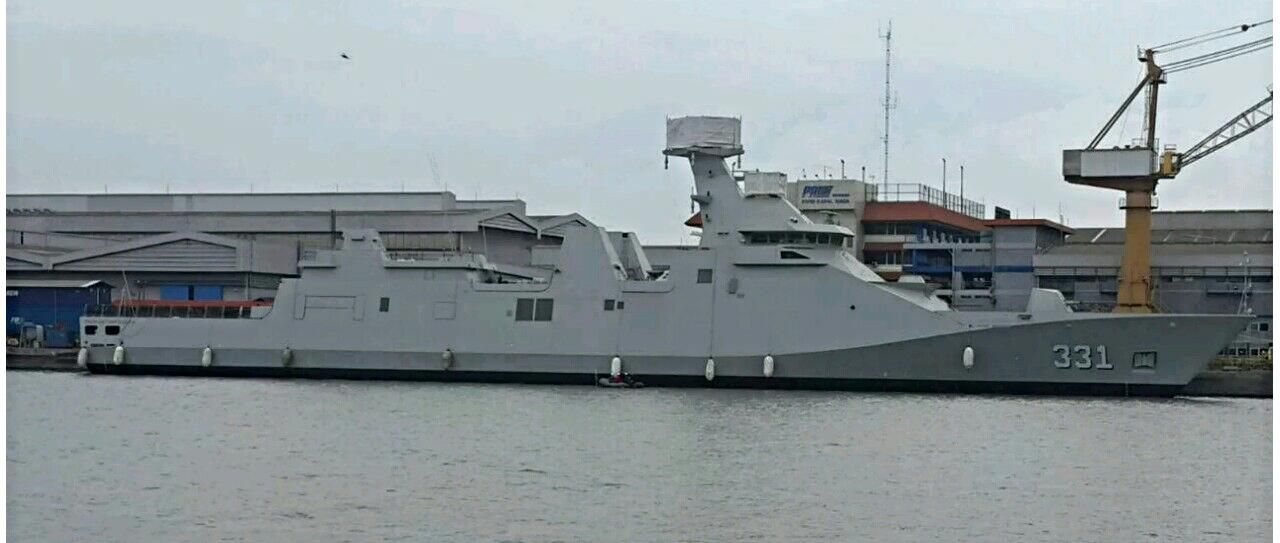
Sigma 10514-class frigate (KRI Martadinata)

- Builders: Netherlands (Damen Schelde Naval Shipbuilding), Indonesia (PT PAL)
- Types: Light multi-role frigate, guided-missile frigate, Long Range Patrol Vessel
- Displacement: 2,075 tons – 2,575 tons
- Armament: Guns: 1 × Oto Melara 76 mm (A position) and 2 × 20 mm Denel GI-2 (Licensed copy of GIAT M693/F2) (B position). Anti-air missile: 2 × quad (8) MBDA Mistral TETRAL, forward & aft. Anti-surface missile: 4 × MBDA Exocet MM40 Block II. Torpedoes: 2 × triple B515 launchers for EuroTorp 3A 244S Mode II/MU 90.
- Powerplant: 2 × SEMT Pielstick 20PA6B STC rated at 8910 kW each driving a lightweight Geislinger coupling combination BE 72/20/125N + BF 110/50/2H (steel – composite coupling combination); 4 × Caterpillar 3406C TA generator rated at 350 kW each; Caterpillar 3304B emergency generator rated at 105 kW
- Speed: 28 knots
- Ships in class: 5
- Operator: Royal Moroccan Navy, Indonesian Navy,Mexican Navy
- Commissioned: 2011
- Status: In active service

== See also ==
- List of naval ship classes in service
