= Pakistan military exercises =

Pakistani military resources and training

Military exercises are conducted by the Pakistan Armed Forces to increase combat readiness, and to identify problems in logistics, training, and current military doctrine. They also test the ability of units to work together. Lastly, they act as a visible expression of military might, which acts as a deterrent to potential enemy action. An important component of each exercise is the after-action assessment. Since 1989 the four branches services have increasingly begun coordinated exercises.

== Joint Exercises ==
=== PASSEX 2020 ===
Gulf of Aden, Africa, 150 km off the coast of Yemen and Somalia Pakistan Navy along with the Japanese Maritime Self Defense Force conduct joint exercise in Gulf of Aden dubbed PASSEX 2020. Pakistan Navy Guided-Missile Frigate PNS Zulfiquar (FFG-251) and Japanese Destroyer JS Onami (DD-111) participated. The aim of the exercise was to strengthen bilateral Pakistan-Japan Naval warfare collaborations and interoperability as well as to ensure maritime security in the region.

PNS ZULFIQUAR participated in Passage Ex (PASSEX) with South Korean Navy Ship DAE JO YEONG in Gulf of Aden. PASSEX aimed to ensure maritime security in the region. It will further strengthen bilateral ties with South Korean Navy, enhance naval collaborations & interoperability.

=== Zarb-e-Momin ===
Exercise Zarb–e–Momin is a joint-command field exercise conducted by the Pakistan Army since 1989. It is usually held in conjunction with the Pakistan Air Force's High Mark exercise. The exercises are conducted to test out the new weapon systems, and include such units as the Pakistan Army Aviation Corps and the Pakistan Army Artillery Corps. The exercise involves the deployment of three field corps, two armored brigades, two artillery divisions, one air-defence division. At the time of the first exercise Chief of Staff General Mirza Aslam Beg described it as a test of an "offensive-defensive" military doctrine and a simulation of an invasion of India. The first exercise also contributed to a real-life military buildup between the Pakistani and Indian Armies, which led to 200,000 Indian soldiers and 100,000 Pakistani soldiers deployed against each other along the Line of Control by March 1990.

=== High Mark ===
Exercise High Mark is the PAF's largest and most comprehensive exercise and is held about every five years. In 2010, it lasted for forty days and covered air defenses across the entire country. Recently it has included army and naval units.

=== Azm-e-Nau ===
The first Exercise Azm-e-Nau was conducted in 2009, while an army exercise, it was fully coordinated with the navy and air force.

In June 2013, the Pakistan Armed Forces started Azm-i-Nau IV to update the military's "readiness strategy for dealing with the complex security threat environment." The objective of the exercise was to assess military tactics, procedures and techniques in the event of the emerging threat environment, and explore joint operations strategies in response to combating the threat through all three branches of the military.

== Army ==
=== Eagle Dash-I ===
February 4, 2016, Pakistan Army hosted first Counter Terrorism Eagle Dash-I exercise with Sri Lanka and Maldives consisting of special forces. The two week-long exercises were held at Pakistan Army's renowned National Counter Terrorism Centre (NCTC) in Pabbi. The centre's geography which includes hills and jungles offered participants the perfect environment to simulate operations against a fictitious terrorist group which could employ guerrilla warfare techniques and challenge the state's writ.

=== Zarb-e-Hadeed ===
Zarb-e-Hadeed is an annual military exercise of the Pakistan Army focused on readiness of military operations and enhance military cooperation between the multiple units. Designed to combat under various testing weather conditions in desert and plains, the participants are trained for winter battlefield environment. It also determines synergy and professionalism capabilities of the military under various discipline such assembly, military tactics and firepower. The exercise also engage cops in strategic plans to determine scope of the conflict. It is annually carried out in Rawalpindi, Punjab for two weeks which ends on 28 February.

== Navy ==
=== AMAN ===
The Pakistan Navy hosted AMAN, a multilateral naval exercise with friendly local, regional, and foreign navies to enhance communication and collaboration. The biennial event features social gatherings, sporting competitions amongst participating nations, and professional exercises and seminars.

=== Sea Spark ===
Exercise Sea Spark is largest of the naval exercises periodically conducted by the Pakistan Navy to simulate naval warfare and the protection of the country's maritime border.

In 2012 the exercise took place in the North Arabian Sea and started on 17 September 2012. The navy officials stressed that exercises were aimed at assessing "operational readiness" and providing an opportunity to the officers and sailors to operate in a multi-threat environment and to exercise their responses accordingly. The navy deployed all active-duty combatant ships, submarines, fighter jets and the special operations forces, including the entire division of Marines and the naval establishments to cover the entire gamut of naval operations. The exercise also included the joint involvement of the army and air force for special joint operations. The navy put special emphasis on conventional and non-conventional war games, including the features of army and air force pitching against navy to determine the naval capabilities in joint operations in specific threat environment.

=== Shamsheer-e-Behr ===
Exercise Shamsheer-e-Behr is a biannual naval war game conducted in Karachi. It focuses on testing the Navy's field exercises, and incorporating them into naval strategies.

=== Tahaffuz-e-Sahil ===
Exercise Tahaffuz-e-Sahil is a periodic naval exercise demonstrating and testing techniques for protection of the coast. In 2015 the exercise focused on protecting the port at Gwadar.

== Air force ==
The Pakistan Air Force has several major recurring military exercises:

=== Exercise Indus Shield ===
Exercise Indus Shield is a large scale international aerial warfare exercise held by the Airpower Centre of Excellence (ACE) at Sargodha.

=== ACES Meet ===
The ACES Meet is a multilateral air exercise hosted and organised by the Pakistan Air Force.

=== Flat Out ===
Exercise Flat Out is an aerial military exercise conducted by the Pakistan Air Force with an objectives of providing training of its personnel for surge operations in war. Because of the induction of new aircraft and in the light of past experience, the rules governing this exercise were modified in 1996 to conform with the wartime role of the various squadrons.

=== Saffron Bandit ===
Exercise Saffron Bandit is a major "command level" combat training exercise, usually held either bi-annually or tri-annually, by the Pakistan Air Force. The initial targets, mainstream goals and purpose of the exercise are focused specifically on the threat from India, particularly that emanating from the Indian Air Force.

=== Shaheen (Eagle)-IX ===
Shaheen (Eagle)-IX is a joint air force exercise involving Pakistan and China. The first Eagle joint exercise was in March 2011.

=== Wide Awake ===
Exercise Wide Awake is an aerial exercise tests the ability of bases and fighter squadrons to react to operational requirements at short notice in peacetime. Since 1997, it has been regularly conducted by the PAF.

== Multilateral Exercises ==
Pakistan has carried out a number of joint military exercises with China, Russia, Saudi Arabia, Iran, and Turkey.

In 2010, the Pakistan Air Force participated in the multinational air exercise called Exercise Red Flag at Nellis Air Force Base, Nevada. They sent several F-16s across the Atlantic with aerial refueling.

=== Mavi Balina ===
Exercise Mavi Balina (Exercise Blue Whale) is an international anti submarine warfare exercise led by Turkish Naval Forces. Blue Whale is held biennially as invitation only basis and considered as the largest anti-submarine warfare exercise in the Mediterranean. It is hosted and administered by the Turkish Naval Forces Fleet Command. Exercise's main headquarters is at Aksaz Naval Base.The aim of the exercise is providing realistic operational training in surface and submarine warfare for units and staffs of participating countries, as well as promote friendship, mutual understanding and cooperation. 2016 Participants were Bulgaria, Canada, Pakistan, Romania, Spain and the US Navy.

In 2018 Pakistan Navy Ship, PNS SAIF (FFG 253), with an embarked Z9EC ASW Helicopter from the aviation wing Squadron 222 participated in "Mavi Balina 2018" hosted by the Turkish Navy during 28 September to 7 October. Pakistan Navy P3C-Orion aircraft also participated in the exercise from Dalaman Airbase. Conducted in the Eastern Mediterranean, the exercise was aimed at practicing antisubmarine defense. Naval and air forces from Turkey, NATO, the United States, Azerbaijan, Bahrain, Algeria, Qatar, Kuwait, Romania and Saudi Arabia were also present.

=== Sea Guardians 2020 ===
In January 2020, Chinese and Pakistani troops completed a nine-day naval exercise in the Arabian Sea. It was the sixth joint naval drill between the two Navies. It took place in the Arabian Sea and along the Pakistani shoreline. It involved Chinese People's Liberation Army Navy task group from its South Sea Fleet, special forces, aerial assets and, for the first time, submarines in a series of live-fire exercises. Chinese ships participating in Sea Guardians included the Type 052D destroyer Yinchuan, the Type 054A frigate Yuncheng, a sizable contingent of special forces, replenishment vessel Weishanhu, and Type 926 submarine support ship Liugong Island. Pakistan contributed a pair of F-22P frigates and a pair of fast-attack craft, plus special forces. According to satellite imagery, an Agosta-90 was seen hidden between the ships at the port Qasim as well and was speculated to participate in the exercise.

=== TURGUTREIS Series ===
TURGUTREIS-II was held right after Mavi Balina 2018 in the East Mediterranean Sea with the same assets. It encompassed entire spectrum of maritime operations, starting with the basic, and culminating at advance level exercises, including combined anti-submarine exercises, air defence exercises, and gunnery firings and surface warfare exercises.

TURGUTREIS-III was held in the Arabian Sea in February 2019. Turkish Navy ship TCG GOKCEADA along with Pakistan Navy ships PNS Alamgir, PNS Aslat and Long Range Maritime Patrol Aircraft took part in the exercise.

=== MALPAK-II ===
In February 2019, Royal Malaysian Navy Ships KD KASTURI and KD MAHAWANGSA had arrived Karachi on Feb 7–19 to participate in Multinational Exercise AMAN-19. Upon completion of the exercise, Malaysian ships also participated in bilateral exercise MALPAK-Il with Pakistan Navy. Pakistan Navy PNS SAIF FFG-253, PNS AZMAT FFG-1013 and long-range maritime aircraft also participated in the drill. This is the second exercise of MALPAK series; the first was conducted after completion of multinational LIMA exercise in Malaysian waters.

== See also ==
- Inter Squadron Armament Competition
