= List of ship commissionings in 2009 =

The list of ship commissionings in 2009 includes a chronological list of all ships commissioned in 2009.

	Operator	Ship	Flag	Class and type	Pennant	Other notes
10 January	United States Navy	George H.W. Bush		Nimitz-class aircraft carrier	CVN-77	
16 January	Portuguese Navy	Bartolomeu Dias		Karel Doorman-class frigate	F333	
16 January	Royal Danish Navy	Ejnar Mikkelsen		Knud Rasmussen-class patrol vessel	P571	
16 January	Namibian Navy	Brendan Simbwaye		Grajaú-class patrol boat	F103	
16 January	Republic of Singapore Navy	Stalwart		Formidable-class frigate	72	
16 January	Republic of Singapore Navy	Supreme		Formidable-class frigate	73	
24 January	United States Navy	Green Bay		San Antonio-class amphibious transport dock	LPD-20	
4 March	Brazilian Navy	Cruzeiro do Sul			H38	
7 March	Indonesian Navy	Frans Kaisiepo		Sigma-class corvette	368	
9 March	United States Navy	Alligator		Marine Protector-class coastal patrol boat	WPB-87372	
11 March	Brazilian Navy	Tenente Maximiano		Tenente Maximiano-class hospital ship	U28	
18 March	Japan Maritime Self-Defense Force	Hyūga		Hyūga-class helicopter destroyer	DDH-181	
23 March	United States Navy	Reef Shark		Marine Protector-class coastal patrol boat	WPB-87371	
30 March	Japan Maritime Self-Defense Force	Sōryū		Sōryū-class submarine	SS-501	
18 April	United States Navy	Stockdale		Arleigh Burke-class destroyer	DDG-106	
25 April	United States Navy	Truxtun		Arleigh Burke-class destroyer	DDG-103	
19 May	Indian Navy	Airavat		Shardul-class tank landing ship	L24	
21 May	Brazilian Navy	Almirante Sabóia		Round Table-class landing ship logistics	G25	Formerly RFA Sir Bedivere
27 May	Lebanese Navy	Al-Kalamoun			43	
27 May	Brazilian Navy	Barracuda		Marlin-class patrol boat	LP02	
2 July	United States Navy	Sea Dog		Marine Protector-class coastal patrol boat	WPB-87373	
23 July	Royal Navy	Daring		Type 45 destroyer	D32	First of class
11 August	Russian Navy	Sprut			112	For Russian FSB Coast Guard
22 August	Royal Norwegian Navy	Barentshav		Barentshav-class offshore patrol vessel	W340	First in class
28 August	Sri Lanka Navy	Sayurala		Vikram-class offshore patrol vessel	P263	Formerly CGS Vigraha (39)
3 September	United States Navy	Hihimanu			R3602	For NOAA
8 September	Royal Canadian Navy	Kelso				For Canadian Coast Guard
10 September	Indian Navy	Kora Divh		Car Nicobar-class patrol vessel	T71	
10 September	Indian Navy	Cheriyam		Car Nicobar-class patrol vessel	T72	
18 September	United States Navy	Sea Fox		Marine Protector-class coastal patrol boat	WPB-87374	
18 September	Pakistan Navy	Zulfiquar		F-22P Zulfiquar-class frigate	251	First in class
25 September	Brazilian Navy	Dourado		Marlin-class patrol boat	LP03	
28 September	(China) Chinese Coast Guard	Chinese cutter Pudong		Haixun-class cutter	1001	For China Coast Guard
10 October	United States Navy	Wayne E. Meyer		Arleigh Burke-class destroyer	DDG-108	
24 October	United States Navy	Makin Island		Wasp-class amphibious assault ship	LHD-8	
5 November	Royal Malaysian Navy	Tun Abdul Razak		Scorpène-class submarine		
6 November	(United States) National Oceanic and Atmospheric Administration	Pisces		Oscar Dyson-class fisheries research ship	R 226	
7 November	United States Navy	New York		San Antonio-class amphibious transport dock	LPD-21	Partially constructed using salvaged steel from the World Trade Center
23 November	Brazilian Navy	Barroso		Barroso-class corvette	V34	First in class
1 December	Republic of Korea Navy	An Jung-geun		Type 214 submarine	SS-075	
14 December	Brazilian Navy	Macaé		Macaé-class patrol boat	P70	
19 December	Pakistan Navy	Shamsheer		F-22P Zulfiquar-class frigate	252	
28 December	Russian Navy	Nerpa		Akula-class submarine	K152	
