= PNS Aslat =

At least two ships of the Pakistan Navy have been named Aslat:

- PNS Aslat (F265), a Garcia-class frigate launched as USS O'Callahan in 1965. She was leased by Pakistan between 1989 and 1994 and renamed Aslat. On her return to the United States Navy in 1994 she was scrapped.
- PNS Aslat (F254), a Zulfiquar-class frigate launched in 2011.
