= PNS Saif =

At least two ships of the Pakistan Navy have been named Saif:

- PNS Saif (F264), a Garcia-class frigate launched as USS Garcia in 1963. She was leased by Pakistan between 1989 and 1994 and renamed Saif. On her return to the United States Navy in 1994 she was scrapped.
- PNS Saif (F253), a Zulfiquar-class frigate launched in 2009.
