= PNS Shamsheer (F252) =

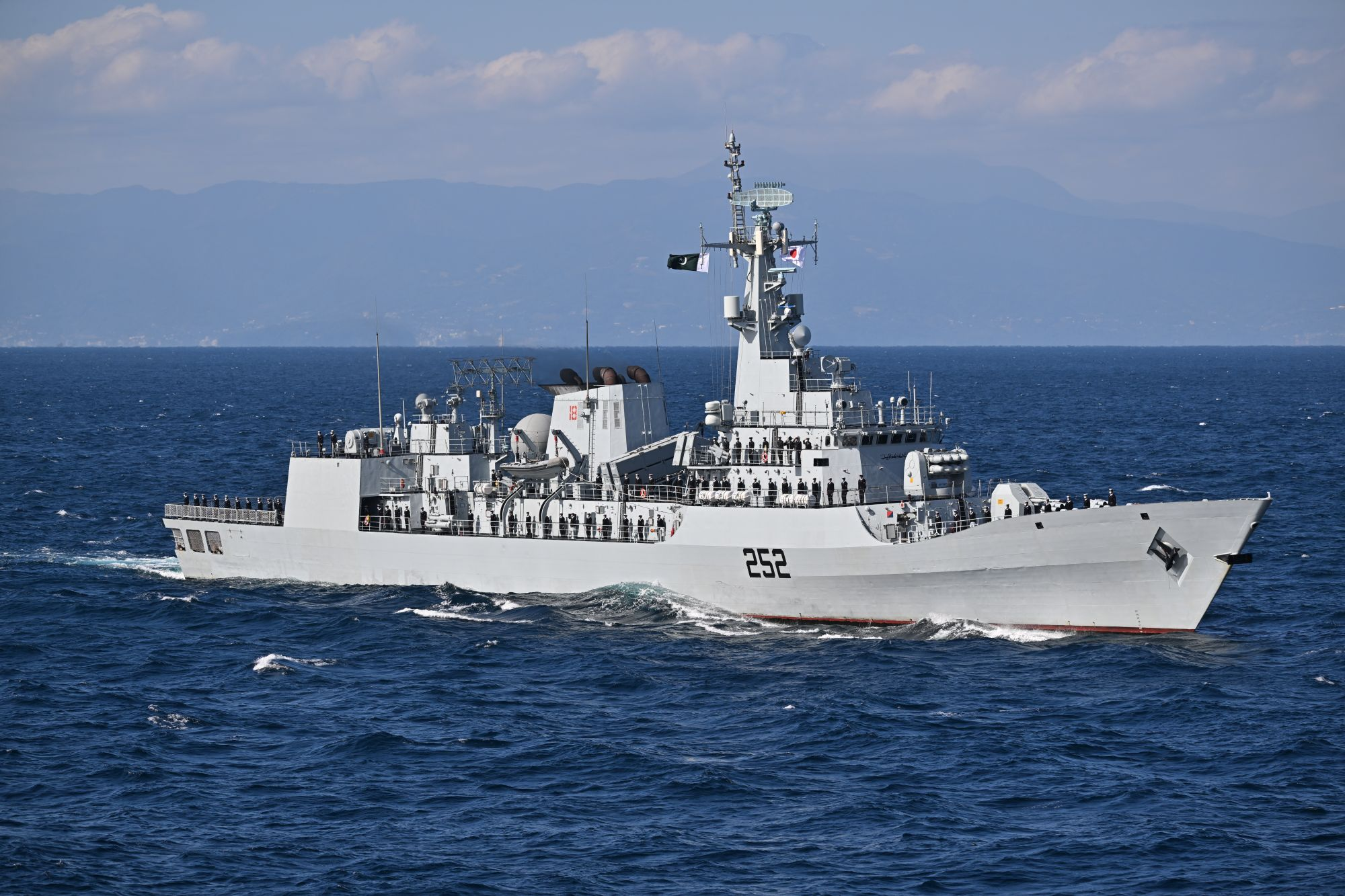
- Shamsheer underway in 2022

History

Pakistan
- Name: PNS Shamsheer
- Namesake: Shamshir (Lit. Sabre)
- Builder: Hudong-Zhonghua Shipyard Co. in China
- Laid down: 13 July 2007
- Launched: 31 October 2008
- Sponsored by: Adm. Noman Bashir
- Commissioned: 19/20 December 2009
- In service: 2009–present
- Home port: Karachi Naval Base
- Status: In active service

General characteristics
- Class & type: F-22P Zulfiquar-class frigate
- Displacement: 2,500 tonnes (standard); 3,144 tonnes (full load)
- Length: 123.2 m (404 ft 2 in)
- Beam: 13.8 m (45 ft 3 in)
- Draught: 3.76 m (12 ft 4 in)
- Propulsion: CODAD (Combined Diesel and Diesel); 2 × Tognum MTU 12V 1163 TB 83 at 10.5 MW; 2 × MTU cruise diesels at 6.6 MW
- Speed: 29 kn (54 km/h) maximum
- Range: 4,000 nmi (7,400 km)
- Complement: 215, 15 officers and 200 enlists.
- Sensors & processing systems: SUR 17 air surveillance radar; SR-60 air/surface search radar; KH 2007 navigation radar; Type 347 CIWS fire-control radar; CIWS electro-optical director; Radar warning receiver suite
- Electronic warfare & decoys: RWD-8 intercept, NJ8I-3 jammer; Decoy flare, chaff launchers
- Armament: Guns: 1 × 76.2 mm calibre AK–176M main gun; 2 × Type 730B CIWS; Missiles: 1 × 8-cell FM-90N SAM launcher; 2 × 4-cell C-802 SSM launchers; Other: 2 × 3-cell ET-52C torpedo launchers; 2 × 6-cell RDC-32 anti-submarine rockets
- Aircraft carried: 1 × Harbin Z-9EC ASW helicopter
- Aviation facilities: Flight deck and enclosed hangar

PNS Shamsheer (FFG-252) is the second F-22P Zulfiquar-class guided missile frigate currently in active service with the Pakistan Navy since her commissioning in 2009.

== Operational history ==
Shamsheer's steel cutting was held at the Hudong–Zhonghua Shipbuilding in Shanghai, China on 13 July 2007– the official date of her keel laying. She was officially launched on 31 October 2008, completing a number of sea trials in China. On 19 December 2009, she was commissioned in the Pakistan Navy in China, with Adm. Numan Bashir, then-Chief of Naval Staff (CNS), sponsoring and overseeing the commissioning of the ship from China.

She is the namesake of Shamsheer, which means Sword and is a special type of sabre with a 5–15° curve from top to tip. Upon commissioning, she embarked on a long journey from Shanghai, China to Karachi, Sindh, and later paying a four-day state visit to Port of Colombo in Sri Lanka.

On 23 January 2010, Shamsheer reported to her home base, Naval Base Karachi. Upon her arrival at the Naval Base, a celebrating reception was held at the deck of the Shamsheer, attended by Chinese Vice Admiral Tian Zhong and Vice-Admiral Asif Sandila, Vice Chief of Naval Staff.

In 2014, Shamsheer visited Port Klang for a goodwill visit, with a passing exercise planned with the Royal Malaysian Navy.

In 2015, Shamsheer was deployed in the Indian Ocean where she was deployed in Yemen to participate in evacuating the foreign and Pakistani nationals from Yemen after the civil war ensued.

In February 2018, Shamsheer provided medical assistance to Iranian fishermen "in the open sea".

As of 2019, Shamsheer is deployed in Persian Gulf as part of the regional maritime security patrol, paying visits in Oman, Bahrain, and Iran. In March 2022, a flotilla of Pakistan Navy warships including Shamsheer visited the Doha International Maritime Defence Exhibition and Conference (DIMDEX 2022) at Hamad port, organized by Qatar Armed Forces. In April 2022, Shamsheer visited Port Mina Salman, Bahrain.

In October 2022, two personnel were injured while working at the forecastle after Shamsheer entered rough seas while en route to South Korea before attending the annual Japanese fleet review. The ship sent a Distress signal to the Philippines after which it anchored at Santa Ana port from where NOLCOM forces transported the injured personnel to a Hospital.

PNS Shamsheer was deployed in the Red sea because of the attacks made on international ships and vessels by the Houthi Rebels of Yemen Starting from late 2023, following the Gaza war.
