= Evacuation of Pakistani citizens during the Yemeni civil war (2015) =

- Part of Yemeni Civil War (2014–present)
- Type: Civil military operations
- Location: Yemen
- Planned by: Government of Pakistan Pakistan Navy
- Objective: Humanitarian relief
- Date: 26 March 2015 - 29 March 2015
- Executed by: Pakistan International Airlines
- Outcome: Around 503 Pakistani citizens evacuated from Yemen

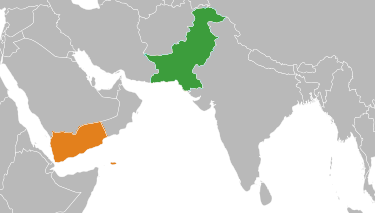
Pakistan is in green and Yemen is in orange.

The evacuation of Pakistani citizens was a civil-military combined effort by Pakistan to extract and evacuate overseas Pakistanis from war-torn areas of Yemen.

According to Ministry of Human Resource Development of Pakistan, there were ~3,000 overseas Pakistanis residing in Yemen prior to the Saudi Arabian-led military intervention in Yemen. In response to the Yemeni crises, the Pakistan government authorized the Pakistan International Airlines to launch of the special flights for aerial evacuation while the Pakistan Navy evacuated the remaining stranded Pakistanis with two frigates.

Besides the evacuation of overseas Pakistanis, citizens of China and the United Kingdom among other countries were also evacuated by Pakistan. Approximately, ~1,800 Pakistan's citizens were extracted from Yemen and safely returned to Pakistan, before the conflict escalated.

== Background ==
On 26 March 2015, the Saudi Arabian Ambassador to the United States, Adel al-Jubeir, announced the Saudi Arabia and the Gulf Cooperation Council launched a military operation against Shiite Houthi rebels in Yemen. This was preceded by weeks of turmoil during which the Houthi guerrillas toppled the government of President Abd Rabbuh Mansur Hadi and took over the large parts of the country.

The Foreign Office had earlier instructed the Pakistani community to leave Yemen as the situation on ground could worsen. However, 3000 Pakistani citizens had not heeded the warnings and were trapped in Yemen. The overseas Pakistanis began reaching out the country's news media, notably Geo News, ARY News, and Express News, appealing the government for a safe evacuation on 27 March. The Pakistan Embassy in Yemen worked towards moving the Pakistani community from Aden to Sana'a; around 150 to 200 Pakistani citizens were still reportedly trapped in Aden. The Pakistan Navy deployed the PNS Aslat missile frigate as well as special aerial missions by PIA were flown in Yemen. On March 29, 2015, the PIA flights evacuated ~503 Pakistani citizens from al-Hudaydah to Karachi.

Month Data	Citizens of Pakistan	Evacuation		Foreign Nationals	
Month Data	Number	Aerial evacuation	Naval evacuation	Foreign Nationals	Number
February–March	1,800	Various sources			
31 March 2015	503	Boeing 747		0	0
2 April 2015	176	Airbus A310		0	0
3 April 2015	176	Airbus A310		0	0
4 April 2015	150		PNS Shamsheer	0	0
5 April 2015	146; 142	Airbus A310	PNS Shamsheer	India; China; United Kingdom; Philippines; Indonesia; Egypt (Ba'athist Syria) Syria; Jordan; United Arab Emirates	11; 8; 4; 5; 2; 1; 1; 1; 1
6 April 2015	134	Airbus A310		Canada; Somalia	2; 2
8 April 2015	51 (36 Pakistanis)		PNS Shamsheer	Romania; Bangladesh; Qatar; Germany; United Kingdom; Philippines	2; 4; 3; 1; 1; 1
8 April 2015	119		PNS Aslat		
Total estimates	~3,382				~52

=== Naval warship deployment ===
The Pakistan Navy had deployed two Zulfiquar-class frigates for the evacuation: the PNS Shamsheer and PNS Aslat.

== See also ==
- Operation Raahat
