= Zahid Ilyas =

Pakistan navy vice admiral

- Education: Pakistan Naval War College; National Defence University
- Military career
- Allegiance: Pakistan
- Branch: Pakistan Navy
- Service years: 1984–2023
- Rank: , Vice admiral
- Commands: Deputy Chief of the Naval Staff, Operations; COMCOAST; Commander Karachi Coast(COMKAR); Deputy Chief of the Naval Staff, Training & Evaluation; Director General C4I; Principal Secretary Chief of Naval Staff; Directing Staff at PN War College; Commander Central Punjab/CommandantNaval War College; Pakistan Naval Academy; Combined Task Force 151; 18th Destroyer Squadron
- Awards: Hilal-e-Imtiaz (Military); Sitara-e-Imtiaz (Military); Sitara-e-Basalat

Zahid Ilyas is a retired vice admiral of the Pakistan Navy. His last appointment was of Deputy Chief of the Naval Staff (Training and Personnel), DCNS-T&P at Naval Headquarters in Islamabad, he took the office as Head of Training and Personnel branch of Pakistan Navy. Prior to assuming Special Service Group in 2021 his previous assignments include commanding officer PNS Babur and PNS Zulfiquar. He was also appointed to Pakistan Naval Academy as a commanding officer.

He graduated from the Pakistan Naval War College and the National Defence University besides obtaining a master's degree in military operational research from the UK and naval command course from China.

== Career ==
He joined the Pakistan Navy in 1984 and got commissioned in Operations branch in 1988. He served at various posts and units throughout his career such as commander of the 18th destroyer squadron and Combined Task Force 151 for Pakistan headquartered in Bahrain. At staff assignments, his was appointed as principal secretary to Chief of Naval Staff, Director General C4I and Deputy Chief of the Naval Staff, Training & Evaluation in Islamabad. During his career, he also served as director general at Joint Cantonment Gwadar Branch in Rawalpindi.

=== Effective dates of promotion ===
| Insignia | Rank | Date |
|---|---|---|
| | Vice Admiral | February 2020 |
| | Rear Admiral | March 2016 |
| | Commodore | September 2013 |
| | Captain | May 2009 |
| | Commander | September 2004 |
| | Lieutenant commander | May 1998 |
| | Lieutenant | June 1991 |
| | Sub Lieutenant | April 1989 |
| | Midshipman | April 1988 |
