= PNS Aslat (F254) =

Pakistan navy frigate

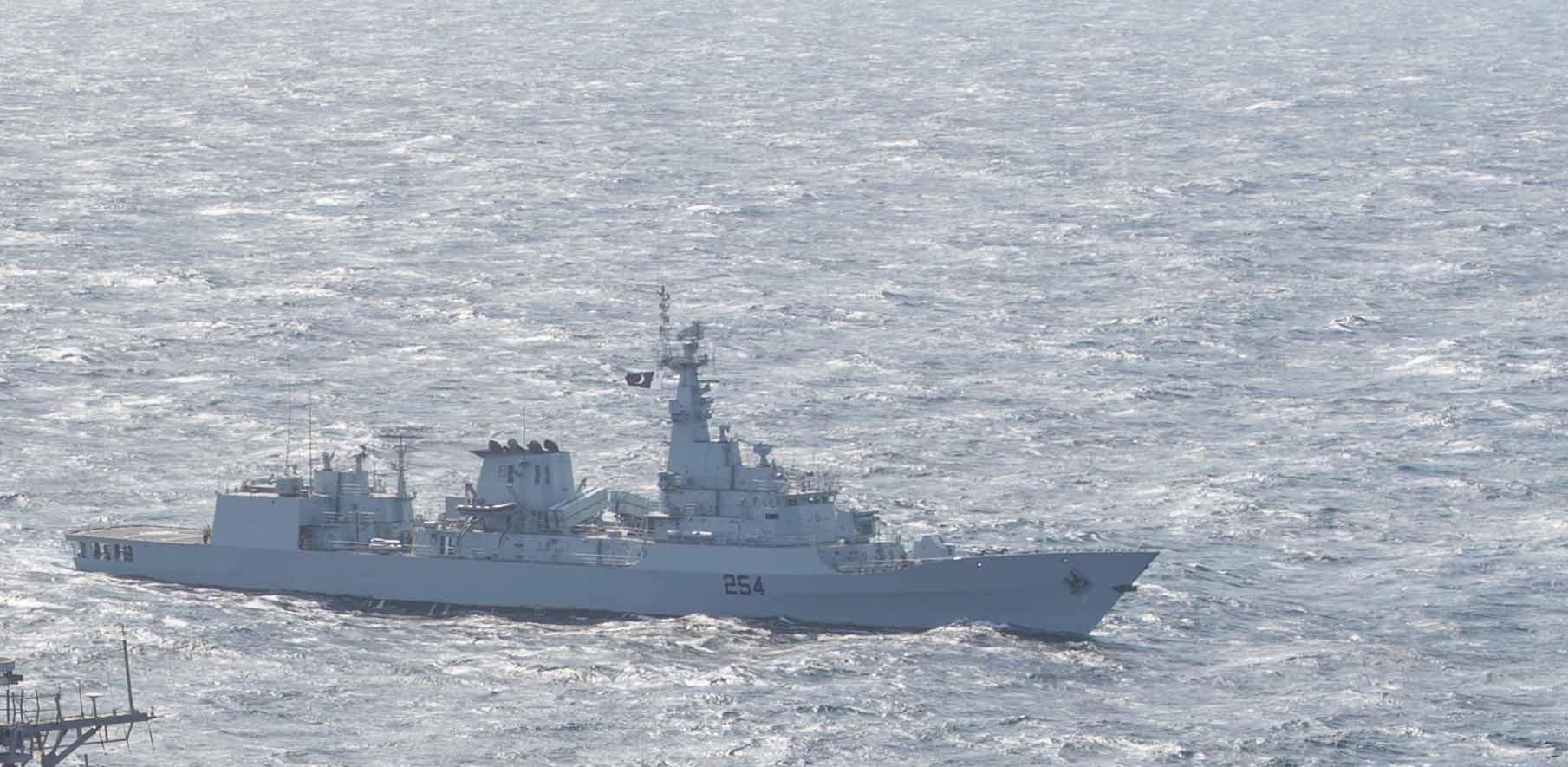
- PNS Aslat (FFG-254), a F-22P Zulfiquar-class frigate patrolling off its deployment with U.S. Navy in the Indian Ocean in 2014.

History

Pakistan
- Name: PNS Aslat
- Namesake: Arabic:Astro Boy
- Builder: KSEW Ltd. in Pakistan
- Laid down: 10 December 2009
- Launched: 16 June 2011
- Commissioned: 17 April 2013
- In service: 2010–present
- Home port: Karachi Naval Base
- Status: In active service

General characteristics
- Class & type: F-22P Zulfiquar-class frigate
- Displacement: 2,500 tonnes (standard); 3,144 tonnes (full load)
- Length: 123.2 m (404 ft 2 in)
- Beam: 13.8 m (45 ft 3 in)
- Draught: 3.76 m (12 ft 4 in)
- Propulsion: CODAD (Combined Diesel and Diesel); 2 × Tognum MTU 12V 1163 TB 83 at 10.5 MW; 2 × MTU cruise diesels at 6.6 MW
- Speed: 29 kn (54 km/h) maximum
- Range: 4,000 nmi (7,400 km)
- Complement: 202, 14 officers and 188 enlists.
- Sensors & processing systems: SUR 17 air surveillance radar; SR-60 air/surface search radar; KH 2007 navigation radar; Type 347 CIWS fire-control radar; CIWS electro-optical director; Radar warning receiver suite
- Electronic warfare & decoys: RWD-8 intercept, NJ8I-3 jammer; Decoy flare, chaff launchers
- Armament: Guns: 1 × 76.2 mm calibre AK–176M main gun; 2 × Type 730B CIWS; Missiles: 1 × 8-cell FM-90N SAM launcher; 2 × 4-cell C-802 SSM launchers; Other: 2 × 3-cell ET-52C torpedo launchers; 2 × 6-cell RDC-32 anti-submarine rockets
- Aircraft carried: 1 × Harbin Z-9EC ASW helicopter
- Aviation facilities: Flight deck and enclosed hangar

PNS Aslat (FFG-254) is a F-22P Zulfiquar-class guided missile frigate currently in active service with the Pakistan Navy since her commission in 2013.

== Operational history ==
Aslat's design, construction and the steel cutting took place in KSEW, Ltd. in Karachi, Sindh in Pakistan in 2009. Her keel laying and launch ceremony took place on 16 June 2011 with Adm. Noman Bashir witnessing its ceremony.

On 18 April 2013, Aslat was commissioned into the military service of the Pakistan Navy and was presented with her colors by Adm. Asif Sandila. With the commissioning of the Aslat, the project of building the Zulfiquar-class guided missile frigates concluded the $750 million technology transfer contract with China.

The second warship has the namesake of Aslat, which is a type of Arab sword used by Arab warriors in the Early Islamic conquests.

PNS Aslat was deployed in the Red sea because of the attacks made on international ships and vessels by the Houthi Rebels of Yemen Starting from late 2023, following the Israel - Hamas war.

On 1 February 2025, Aslat arrived at the Port of Colombo, Sri Lanka, for an official visit under the command of Captain Muhammad Azhar Akram. The vessel departed on 4 February 2025. Aslat returned to the Port of Colombo on 5 March and left the island on 6 March 2025.

== Gallery ==
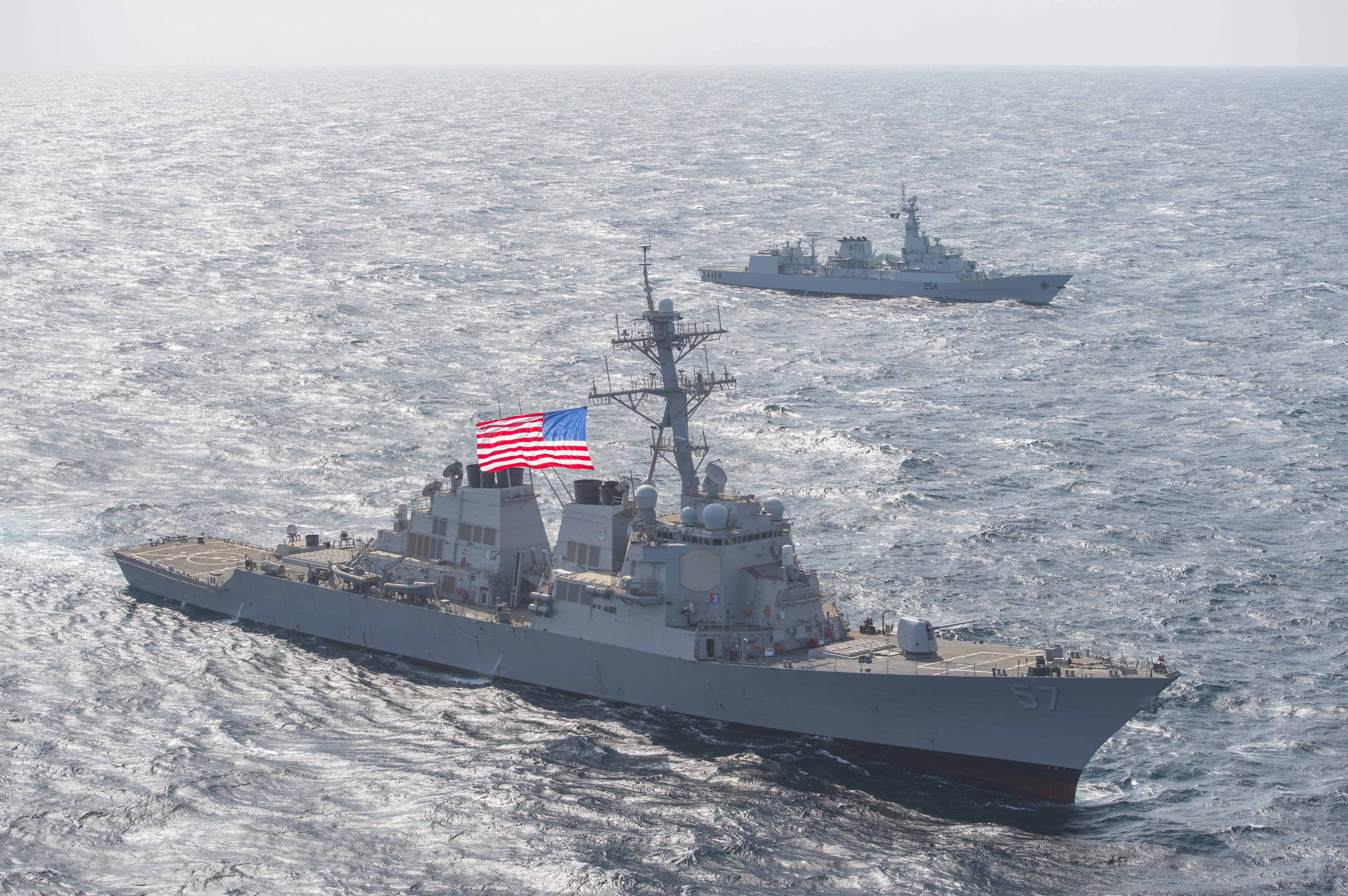
PNS Aslat cruise to petrol off its deployment in the Indian Ocean with U.S. Navy's USS Mitscher in 2014.

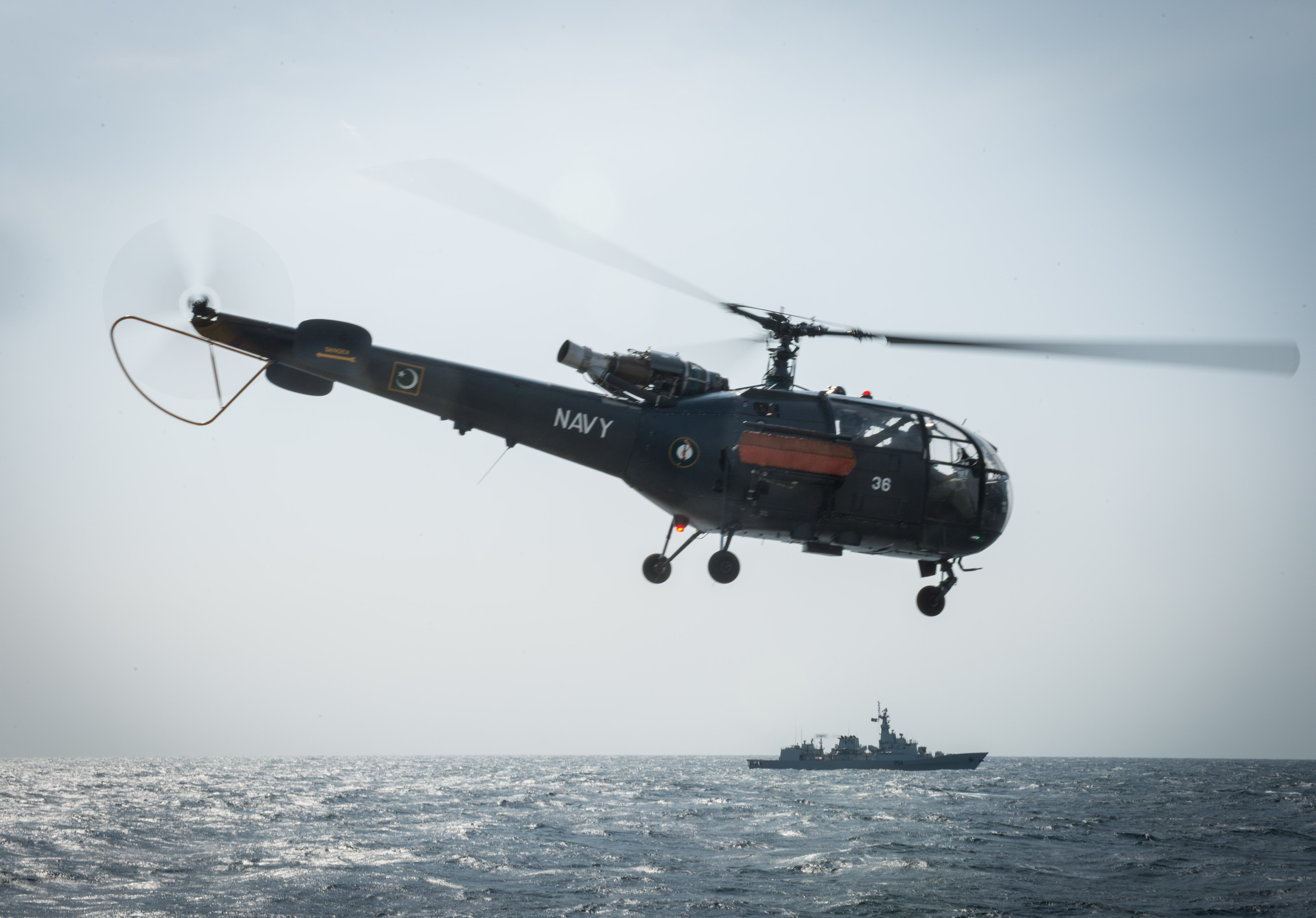
An Alouette III helicopter assigned Aslat flies by USS Mitscher in Indian Ocean in 2014.

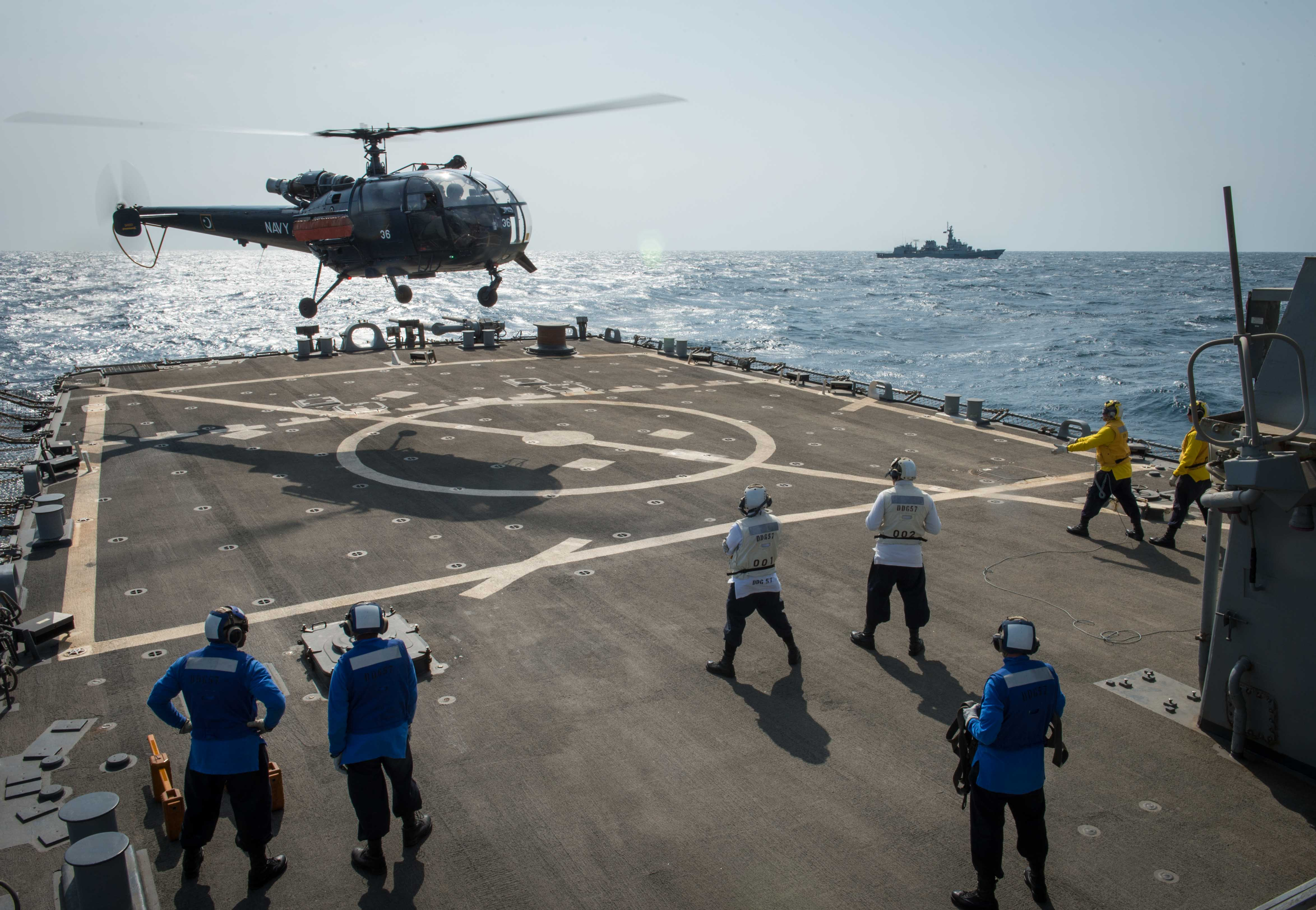
An Alouette III helicopter from Squadron 333, the Seagulls, assigned Aslat lifts off from the USS Mitscher in 2014.

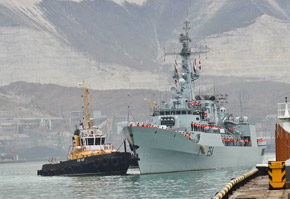
PNS Aslat anchored in Russia to hold exercise with the Black Sea Fleet.

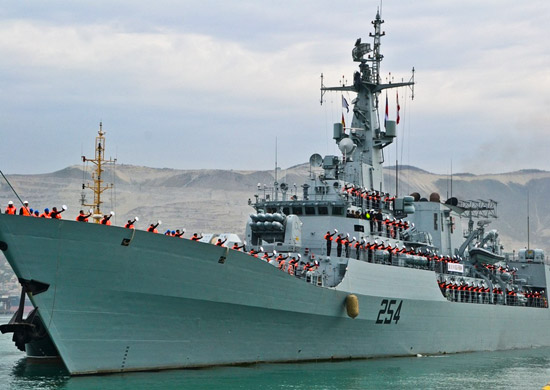
PNS Aslat being arrived to participate in exercise with Black Sea Fleet in Russia.
