= PNS Saif (F253) =

Pakistani war ship

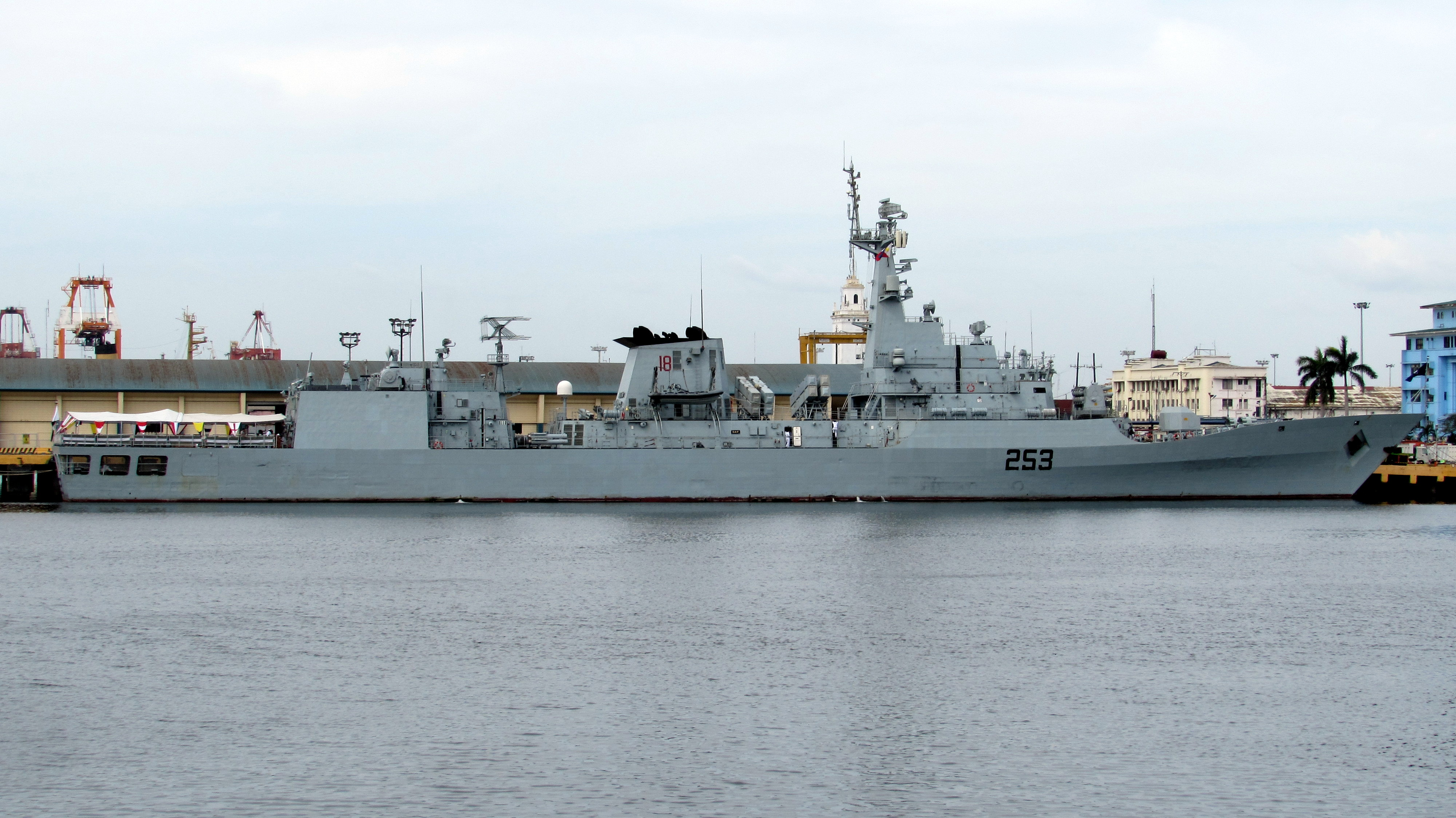
- PNS Saif (FFG-253) anchored in the Manila South Harbor in the Philippines in 2017

History

Pakistan
- Name: PNS Saif
- Namesake: Saif (Lit. talwar, sword)
- Builder: Hudong-Zhonghua Shipyard Co. in China
- Laid down: 4 November 2008
- Launched: 28 May 2009
- Commissioned: 19 September 2010
- In service: 2010–present
- Home port: Karachi Naval Base
- Nickname(s): Saifuddin
- Status: In active service

General characteristics
- Class & type: F-22P Zulfiquar-class frigate
- Displacement: 2,500 tonnes (standard); 3,144 tonnes (full load)
- Length: 123.2 m (404 ft 2 in)
- Beam: 13.8 m (45 ft 3 in)
- Draught: 3.76 m (12 ft 4 in)
- Propulsion: CODAD (Combined Diesel and Diesel); 2 × Tognum MTU 12V 1163 TB 83 at 10.5 MW; 2 × MTU cruise diesels at 6.6 MW
- Speed: 29 kn (54 km/h) maximum
- Range: 4,000 nmi (7,400 km)
- Complement: 202, 14 officers and 188 enlists.
- Sensors & processing systems: SUR 17 air surveillance radar; SR-60 air/surface search radar; KH 2007 navigation radar; Type 347 CIWS fire-control radar; CIWS electro-optical director; Radar warning receiver suite
- Electronic warfare & decoys: RWD-8 intercept, NJ8I-3 jammer; Decoy flare, chaff launchers
- Armament: Guns: 1 × 76.2 mm calibre AK–176M main gun; 2 × Type 730B CIWS; Missiles: 1 × 8-cell FM-90N SAM launcher; 2 × 4-cell C-802 SSM launchers; Other: 2 × 3-cell ET-52C torpedo launchers; 2 × 6-cell RDC-32 Anti-submarine rockets
- Aircraft carried: 1 × Harbin Z-9EC ASW helicopter
- Aviation facilities: Flight deck and enclosed hangar

PNS Saif (FFG-253) is a F-22P Zulfiquar-class guided missile frigate which serves as the front line warship of the Pakistan Navy since her commission in 2010.

== Operational history ==
Saif was constructed and built in China by Hudong-Zhonghua Shipyard Co. where her keel laying was performed. Saif was subjected to the extensive sea trials conducted by the Pakistan Navy in China under Captain Zubair Shafiq on June–July 2010, and was acquired on 9 November 2010.

On 19 September 2010, Saif was commissioned into the military services of the Pakistan Navy with Adm. Noman Bashir overseeing her commissioning ceremony in China. She is the second warship to have the name Saif, which is a talwar (Urdu: تلوار) or sword (Arabic: سيف). Her commissioning ended the construction phase of the project in China.

On 18 November 2025, Saif arrived at the Port of Colombo, Sri Lanka, on a replenishment mission. The vessel departed the island on 19 November.

== Gallery ==
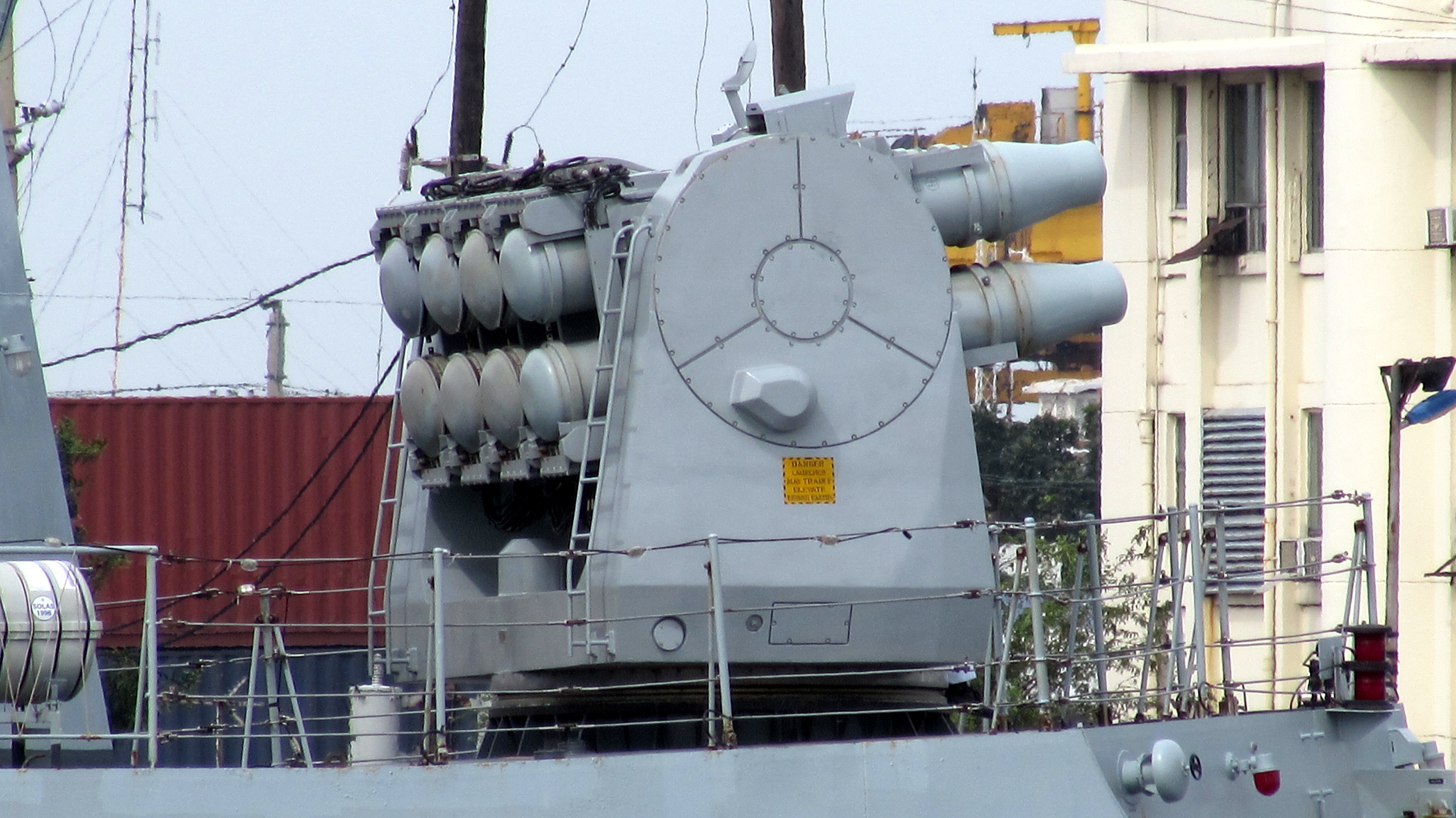
The FM-90N SAM system installed in Saif

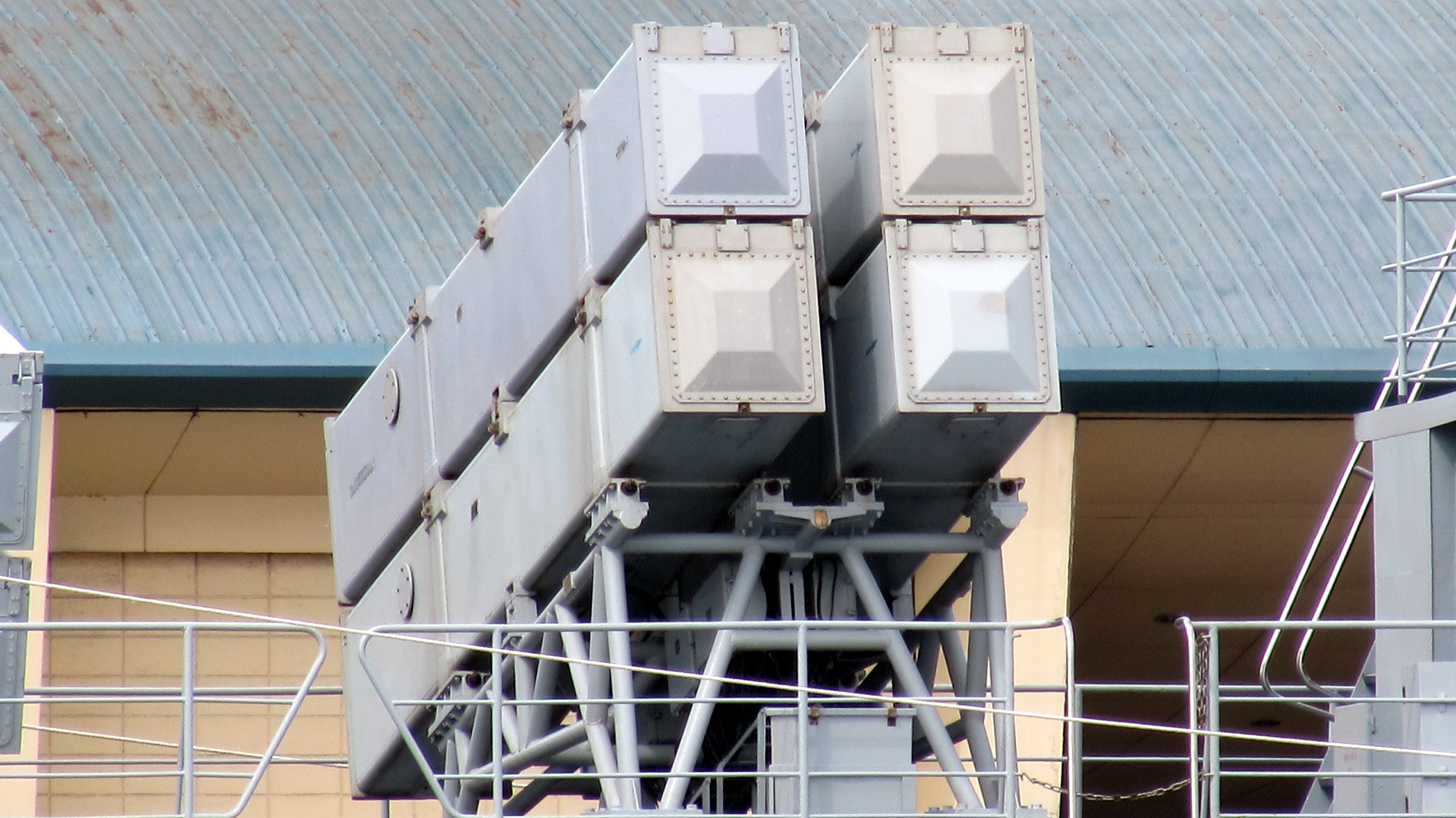
The 4-cell C-802 Eagle Strike guided missiles installed in Saif

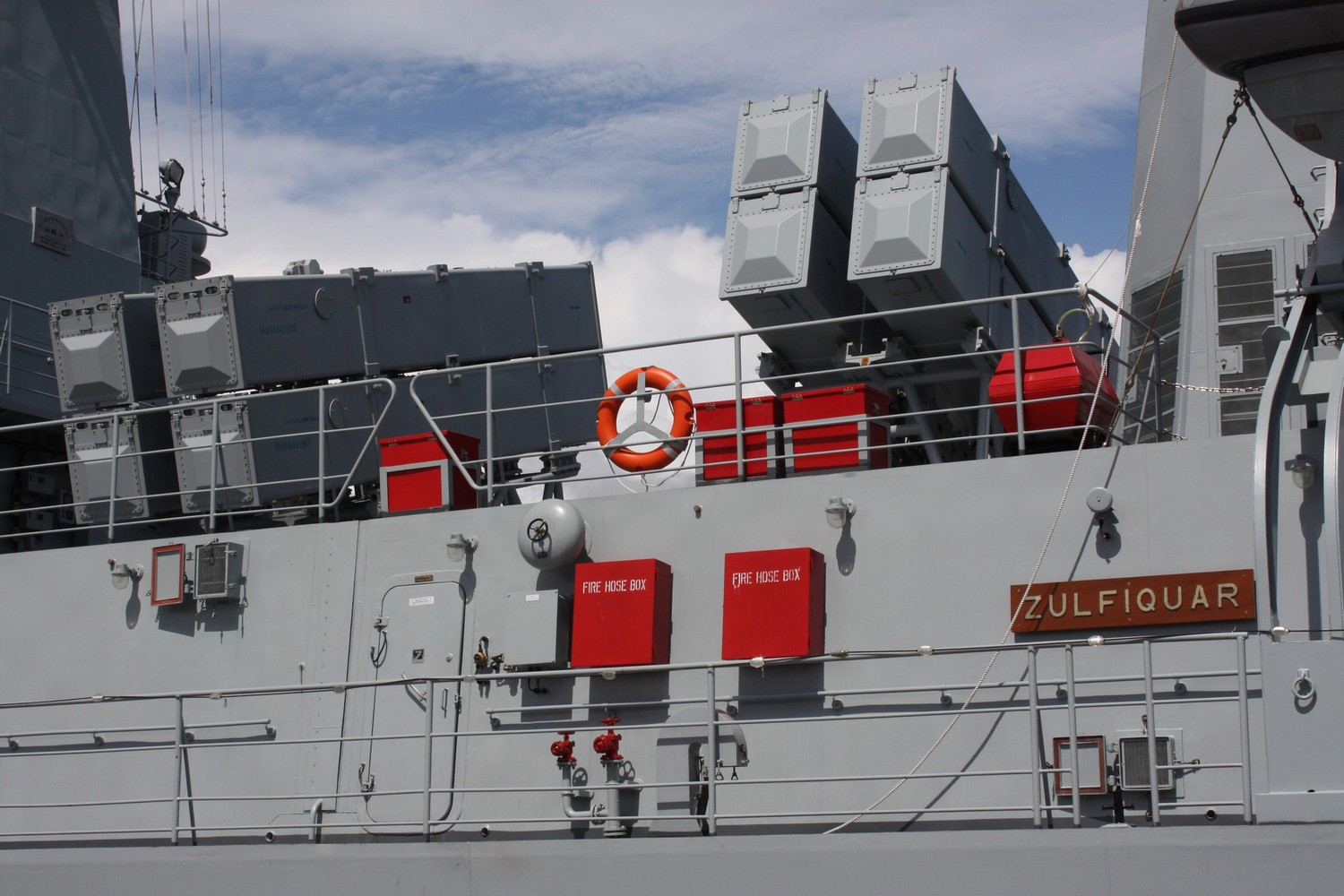
The C-802 "Eagle" SSM system installed in Saif

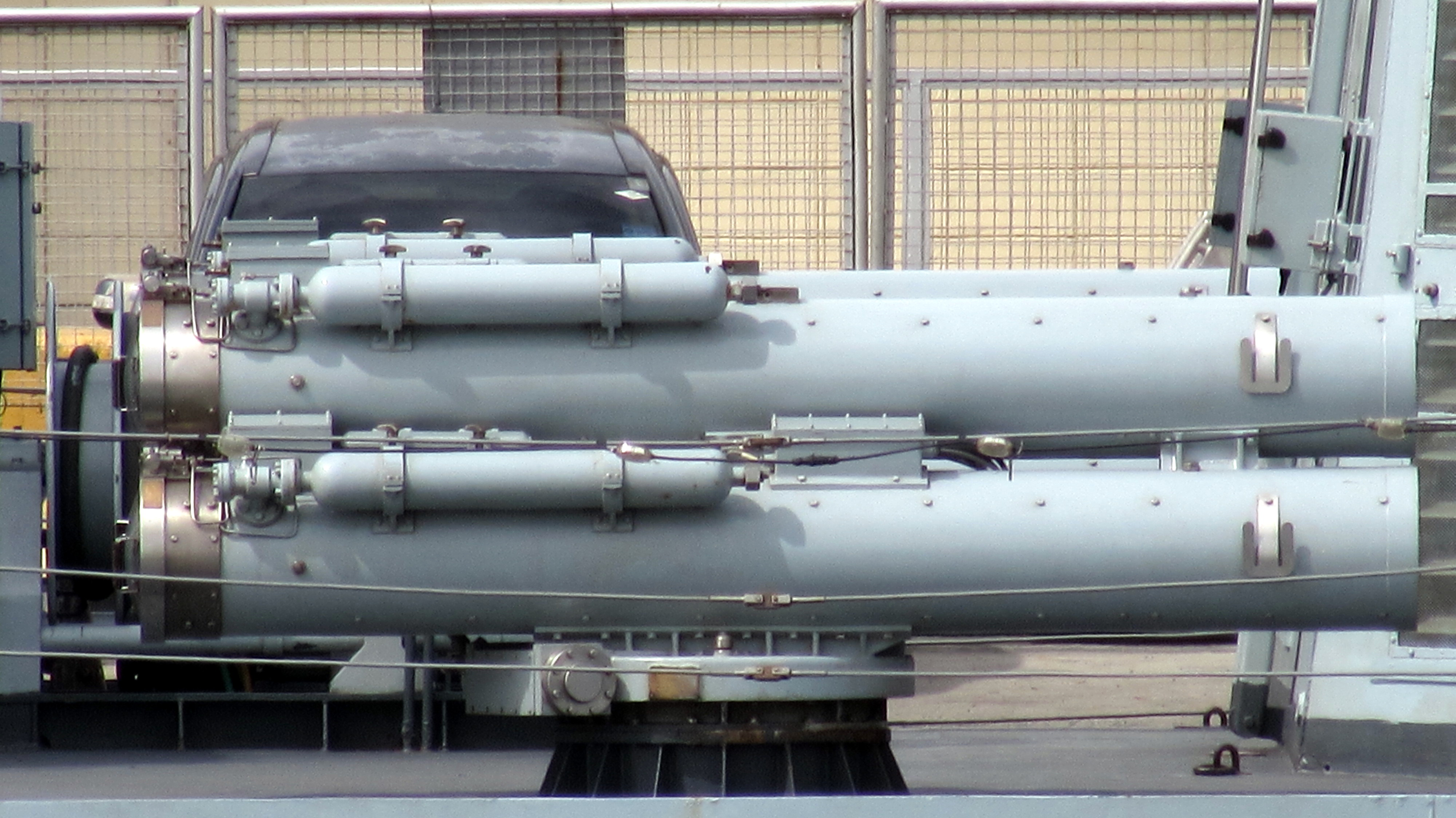
The ET-52C torpedo tube launchers

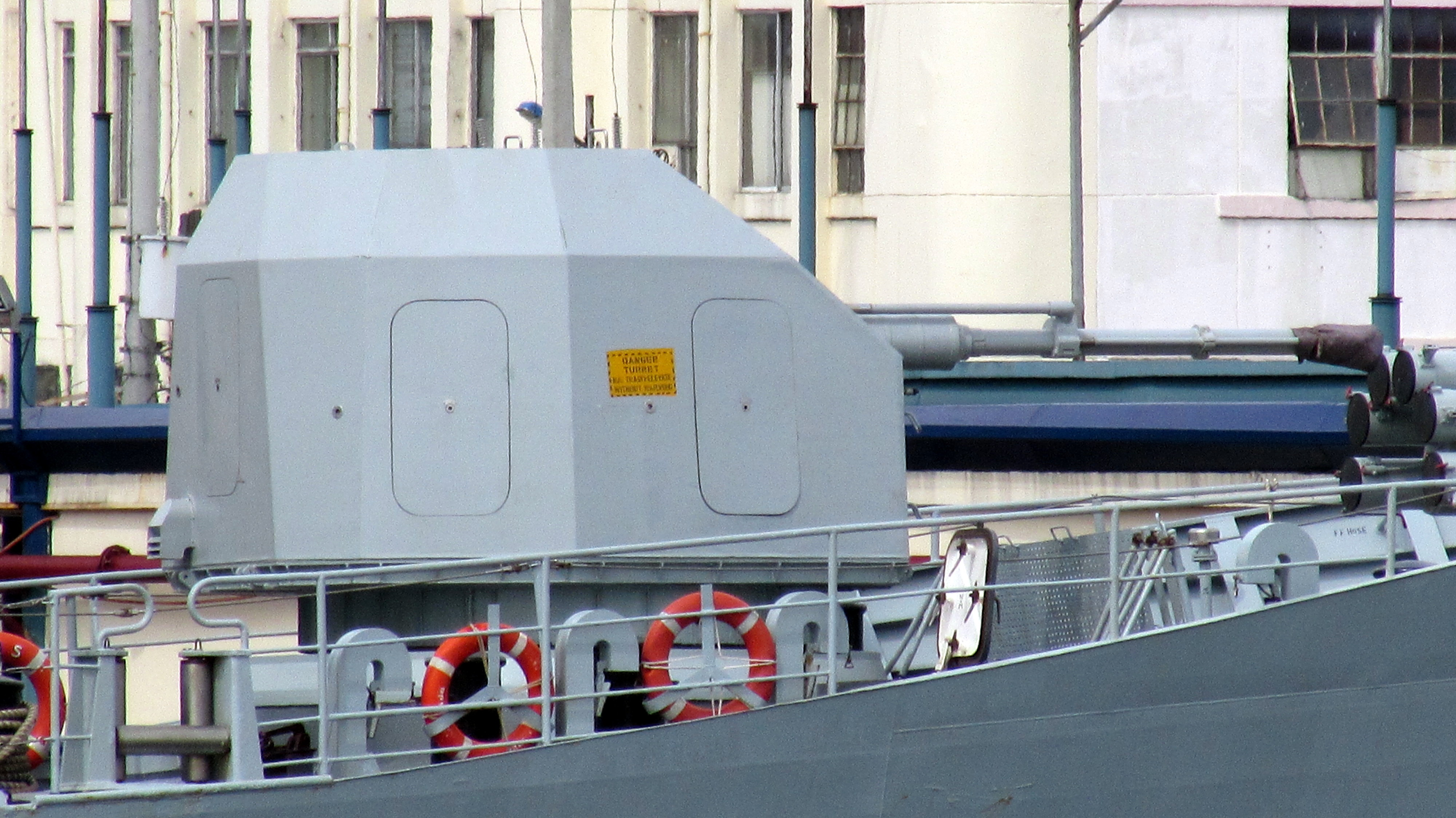
The 76.2 mm gun mounted on Zulfiqar as main naval artillery
