= PNS Zulfiquar (F251) =

Pakistani Navy frigate

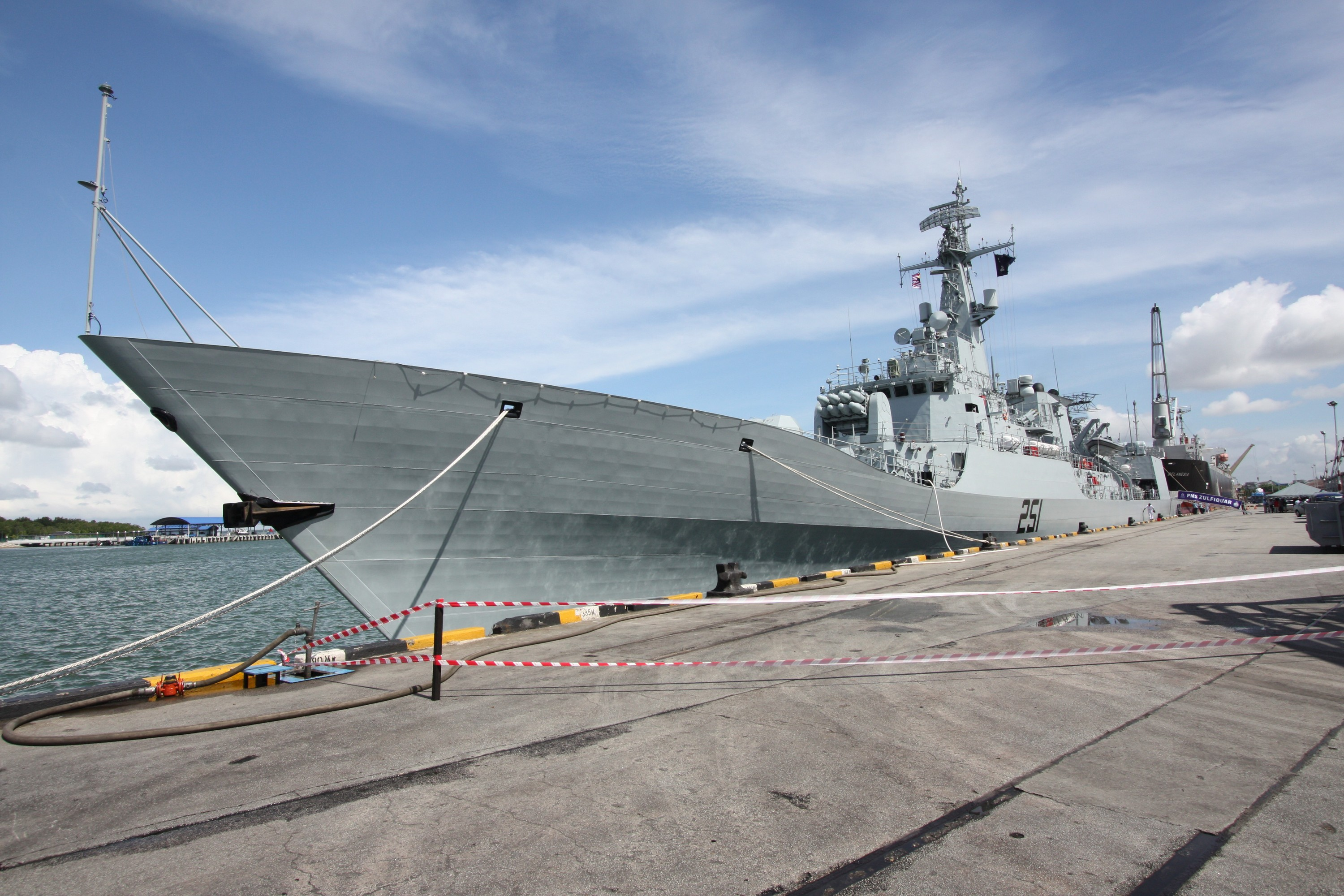
- PNS Zulfiquar (FFG-251), a F-22P Zulfiquar-class frigate anchored in Port Klang in Malaysia in 2009.

History

Pakistan
- Name: PNS Zulfiquar
- Namesake: Zulfiqar (lit. Sword)
- Builder: Hudong–Zhonghua Shipbuilding Co., China
- Laid down: 24 July 2007
- Launched: 7 April 2008
- Acquired: 30 July 2009
- Commissioned: 19 September 2009
- In service: 2009–present
- Home port: Karachi Naval Base
- Status: In active service
- Badge

General characteristics
- Class & type: F-22P Zulfiquar-class frigate
- Displacement: 2,500 tonnes (standard); 3,144 tonnes (full load)
- Length: 123.2 m (404 ft 2 in)
- Beam: 13.8 m (45 ft 3 in)
- Draught: 3.76 m (12 ft 4 in)
- Propulsion: CODAD (Combined Diesel and Diesel); 2 × Tognum MTU 12V 1163 TB 83 at 10.5 MW; 2 × MTU cruise diesels at 6.6 MW
- Speed: 29 kn (54 km/h) maximum
- Range: 4,000 nmi (7,400 km)
- Complement: 215 (15 officers and 200 enlisted personnel)
- Sensors & processing systems: SUR 17 air surveillance radar; SR-60 air/surface search radar; KH 2007 navigation radar; Type 347 CIWS fire-control radar; CIWS electro-optical director; Radar warning receiver suite
- Electronic warfare & decoys: RWD-8 intercept, NJ8I-3 jammer; Decoy flare, chaff launchers
- Armament: Guns: 1 × 76.2 mm calibre AK–176M main gun; 2 × Type 730B CIWS; Missiles: 1 × 8-cell FM-90N SAM launcher; 2 × 4-cell C-802 SSM launchers; Other: 2 × 3-cell ET-52C torpedo launchers; 2 × 6-cell RDC-32 anti-submarine rockets
- Aircraft carried: 1 × Harbin Z-9EC ASW helicopter
- Aviation facilities: Flight deck and enclosed hangar

PNS Zulfiquar (FFG-251) is the lead ship of the F-22P Zulfiquar-class guided missile frigates, in service with the Pakistan Navy since 2009. She was designed and constructed by the Chinese firm Hudong–Zhonghua Shipbuilding in Shanghai. The vessel's design was primarily influenced by the Type 053H3 frigate.

== Design and construction ==
After a bilateral contract was signed between Pakistan and China on 4 April 2006, she was designed and constructed by Hudong–Zhonghua Shipbuilding Co. in China, with steel cutting held on 10 October 2006 in Shanghai.

She was officially laid down on 24 July 2007 and launched on 7 April 2008 to complete several sea trials in China. She is the lead ship of her class and was acquired by the Pakistan Navy on 30 July 2009.

On 12 September 2009, she arrived and reported to her home base, Naval Base Karachi, ahead of her formal induction into the fleet. The induction ceremony, marking her commissioning into the Pakistan Navy, was held on 19 September 2009, with the then-Chairman joint chiefs, General Tariq Majid, visiting the ship and presenting her with military colours. The warship was later visited by General Ashfaq Parvez Kayani, the army chief, and Admiral Noman Bashir, who boarded a United States aircraft carrier to meet a senior American officer, possibly Admiral Mike Mullen.

== Deployments and war service ==
Following her commissioning, Zulfiquar has been deployed in operations connected to the war on terror in Afghanistan and to counter piracy off the coast of Somalia, including leading a military operation to rescue and transport the crew of the merchant vessel Suez in 2011.

On 6 September 2014, al-Qaeda's Indian subcontinent branch attempted to seize control of Zulfiquar after infiltrating Naval Base Karachi. The Navy Special Service Group's Navy SEAL teams and the 1st Marines responded by engaging the attackers, capturing four assailants alive who were confined in a compartment of the ship. Investigators concluded that the attackers, who remained on active duty with the Navy, intended to use the ship's cruise and anti-ship missile systems against a U.S. Navy fleet in the Indian Ocean.

Western sources reported that eleven people were killed in the ensuing gunfight and a suicide attack: ten attackers, of whom four were aboard Zulfiquar (including the organisers of the attack, Lieutenant Zeeshan Rafiq and Owais Jakhrani, a former lieutenant) and six more, dressed as marines, who attempted to infiltrate the ship by dinghy; and one petty officer.

On 13 September 2014, the Navy confirmed that it had detained seventeen naval personnel, including three key naval officers who had attempted to flee to Afghanistan through Mastung, Balochistan. On 25 March 2016, the Navy JAG Corps announced that five naval officers had been sentenced to death for their involvement in the attack.

Unnamed officials told journalist Steve Coll that India's Research and Analysis Wing holds evidence suggesting that, unbeknownst to the attackers, Zulfiquar was carrying a nuclear warhead during the incident. This reporting is uncorroborated elsewhere and is inconsistent with publicly available information about Pakistan's nuclear weapons programme, its delivery systems, and its handling of nuclear materials.

== Gallery ==
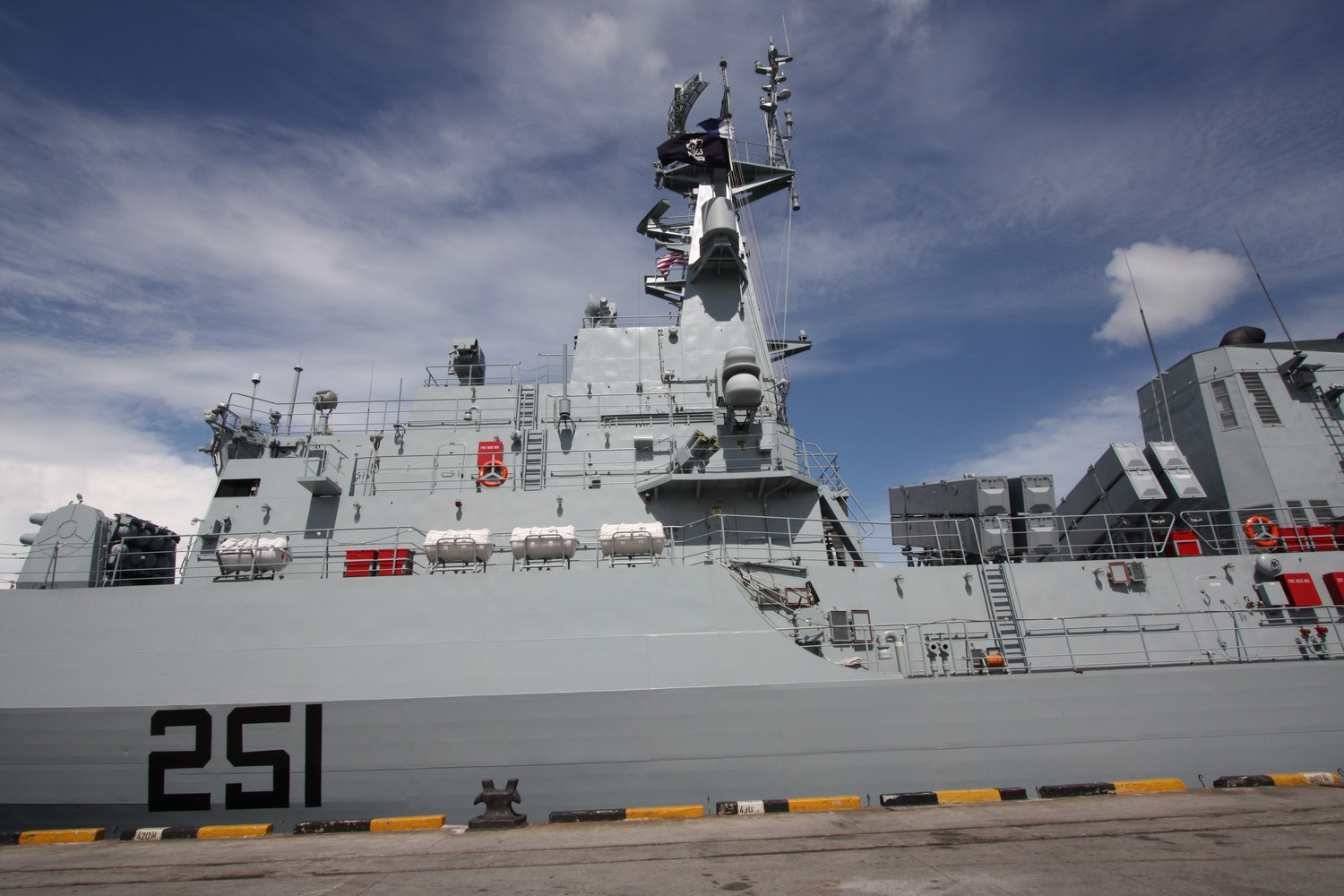
The side of PNS Zulfiquar anchored in Port Klang, Malaysia, in 2009

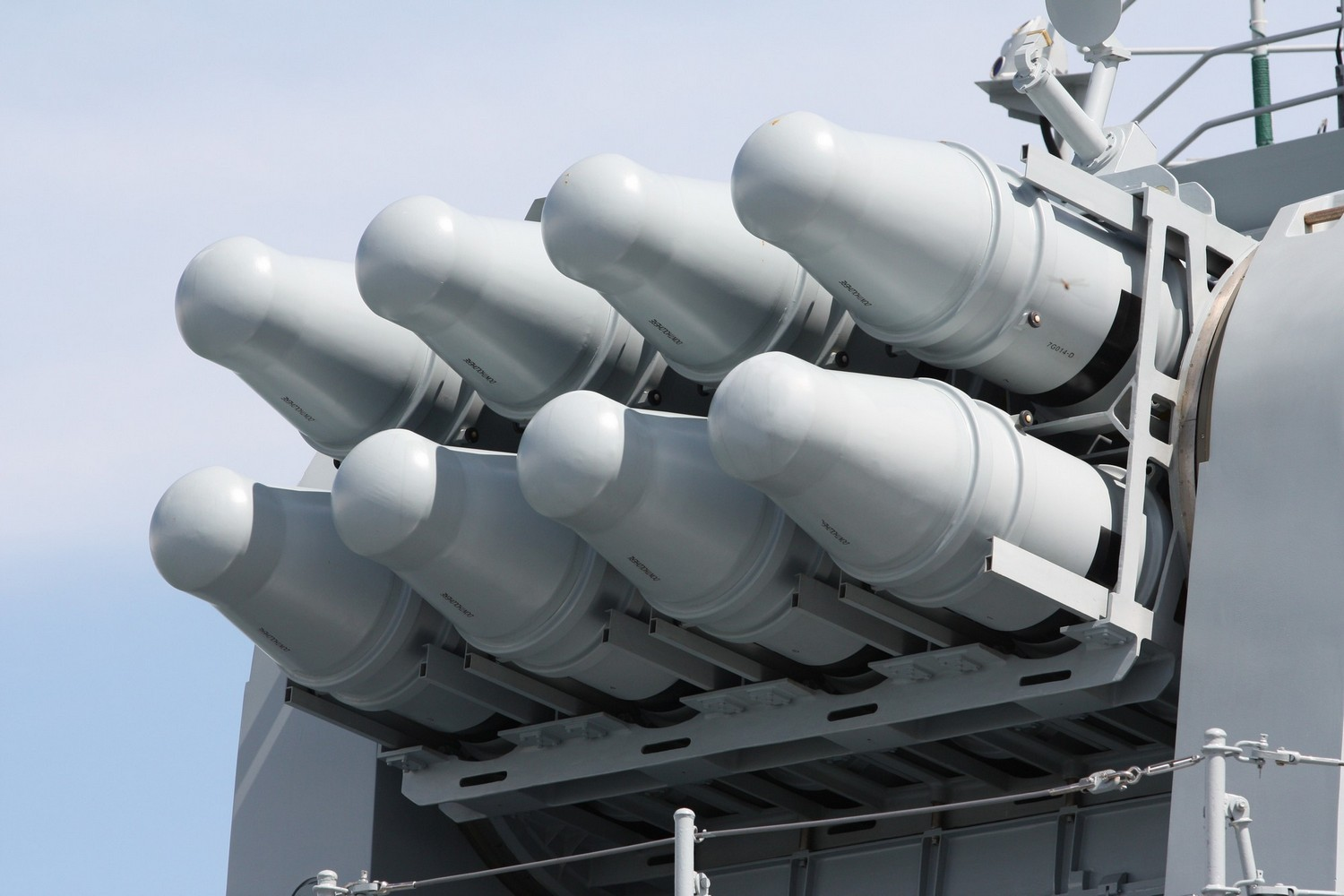
The FM-90N SAM system installed on Zulfiquar

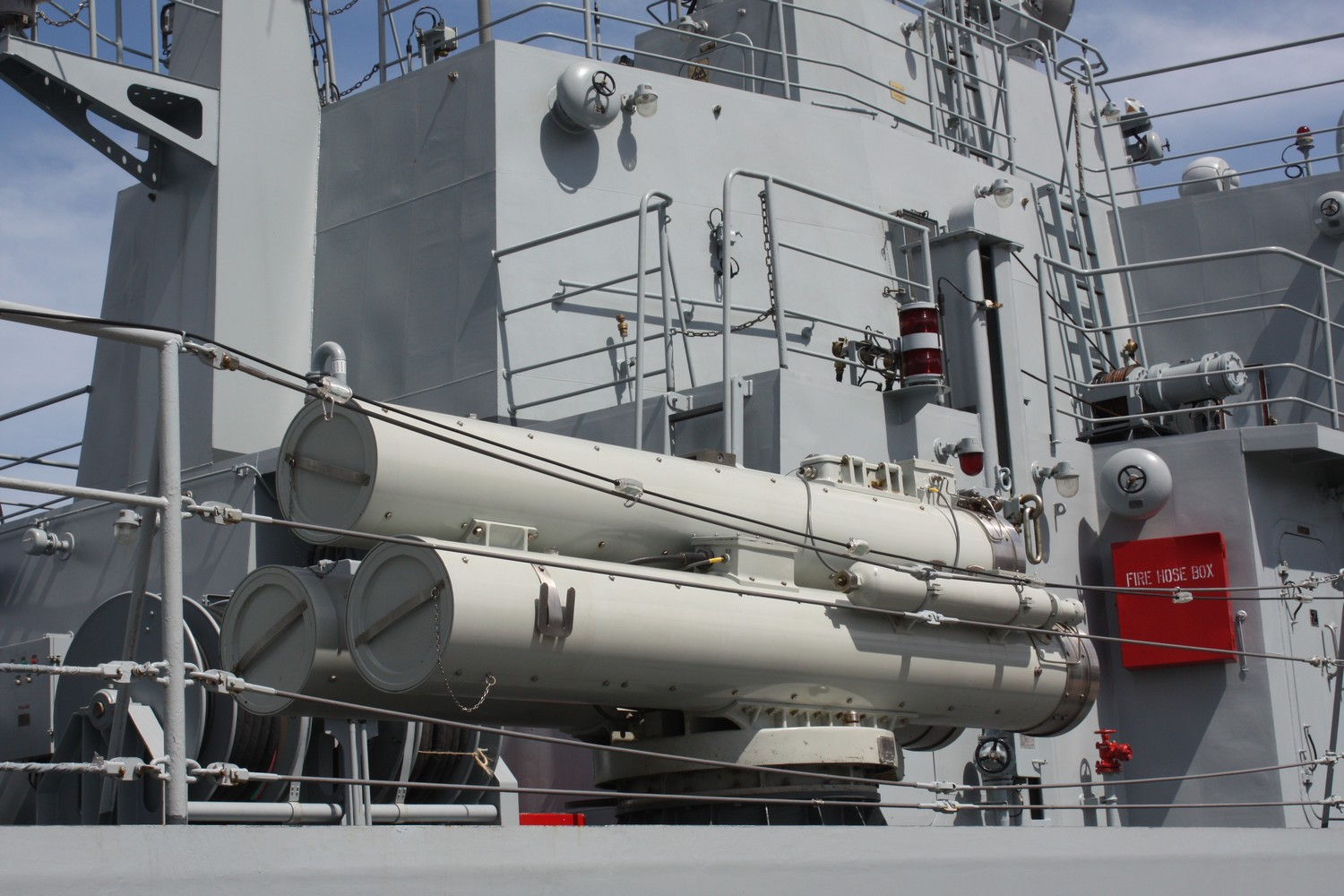
The 3-cell ET-52C torpedo tubes installed on Zulfiquar

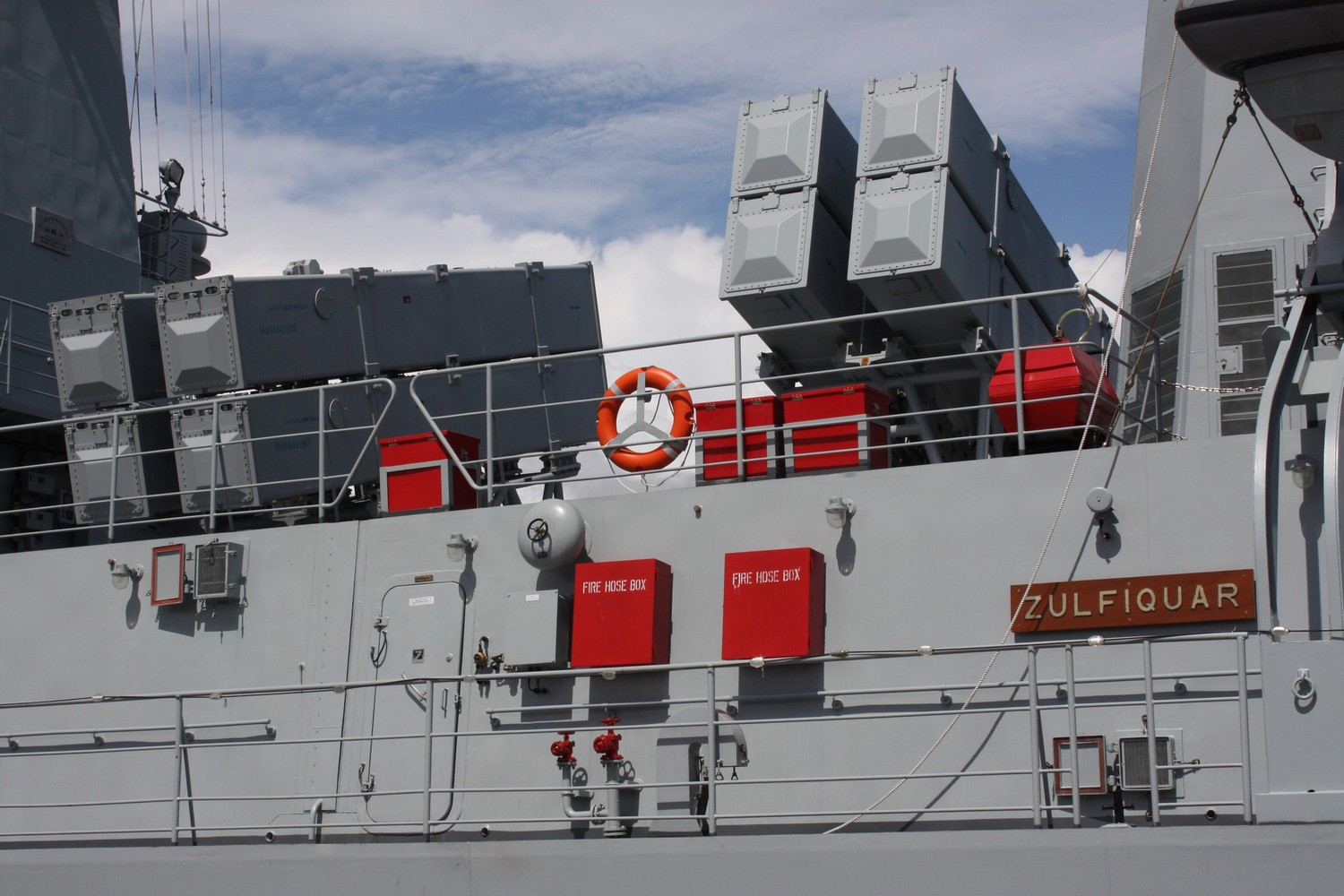
The C-802 "Eagle" SSM system installed on Zulfiquar

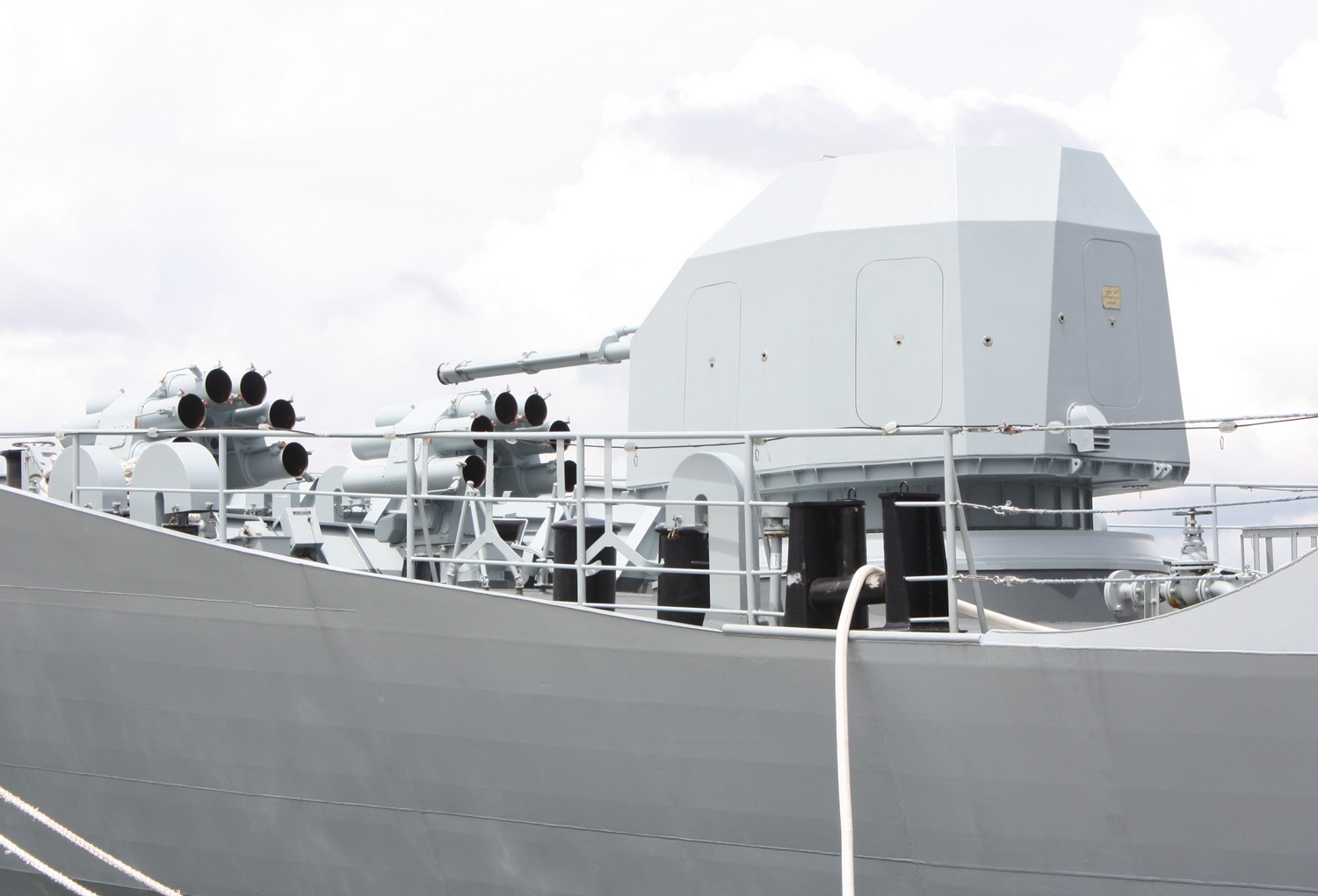
The 76.2 mm gun mounted on Zulfiquar as main naval artillery

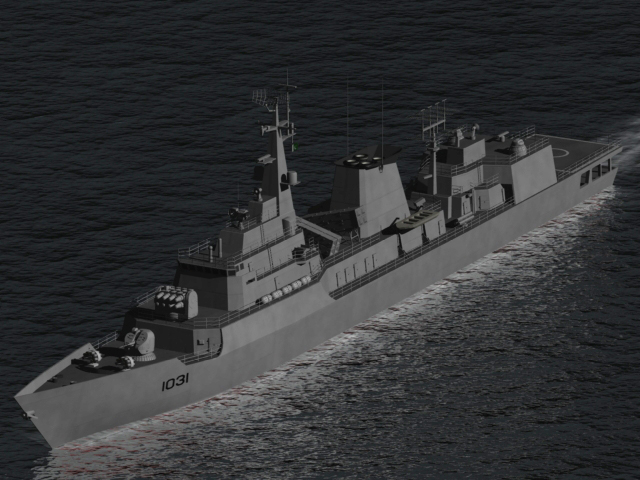
A CAD graphical design of Zulfiquar created using LightWave 3D

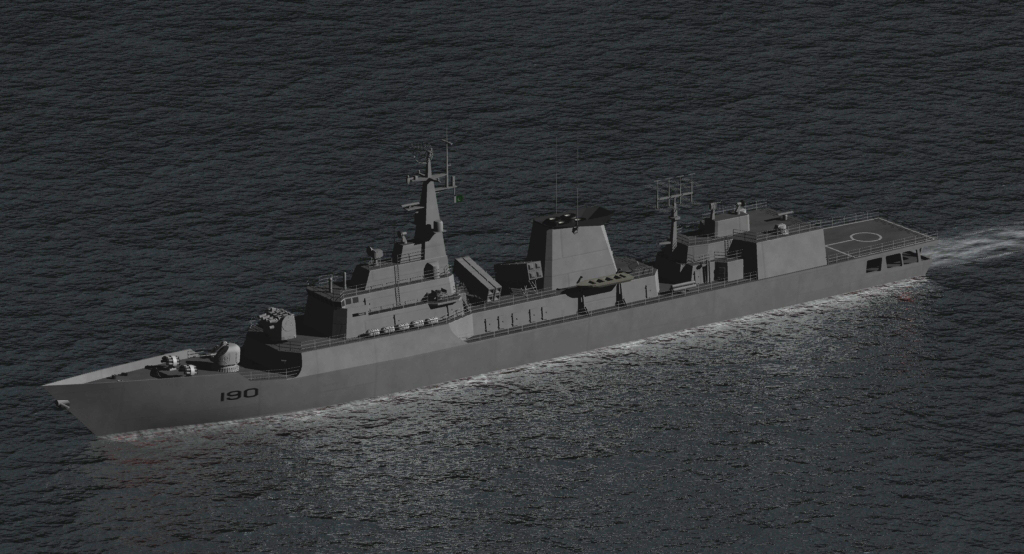
A graphical design of Zulfiquar created using LightWave 3D

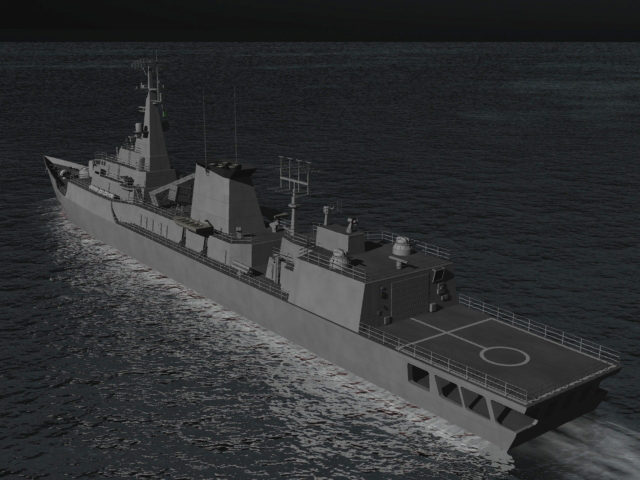
A rendering of a 3D model of Zulfiquar created using LightWave 3D

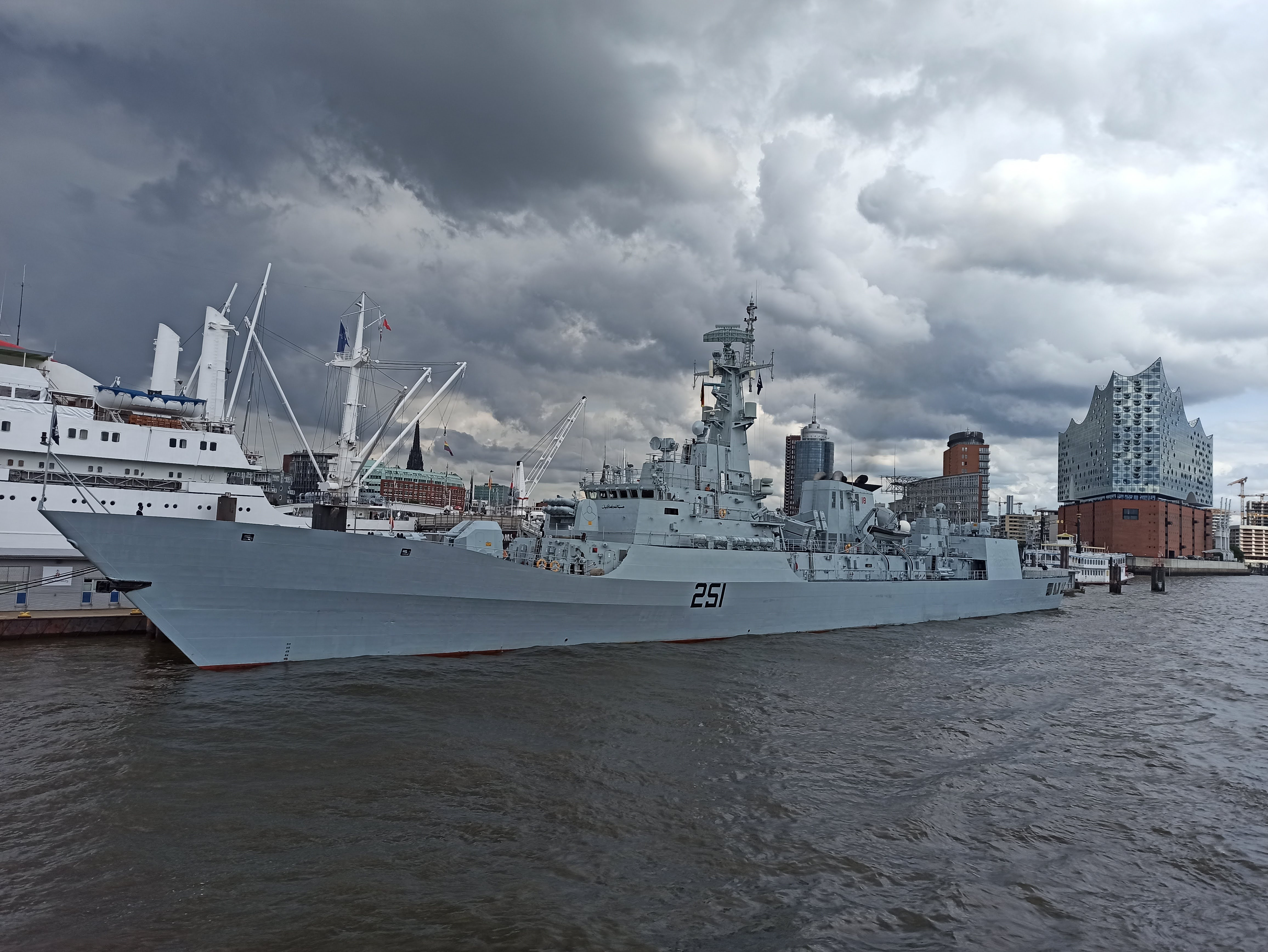
PNS Zulfiquar moored in the Port of Hamburg in 2021
