= Zulfiquar-class frigate =

Class of Pakistan Navy frigates

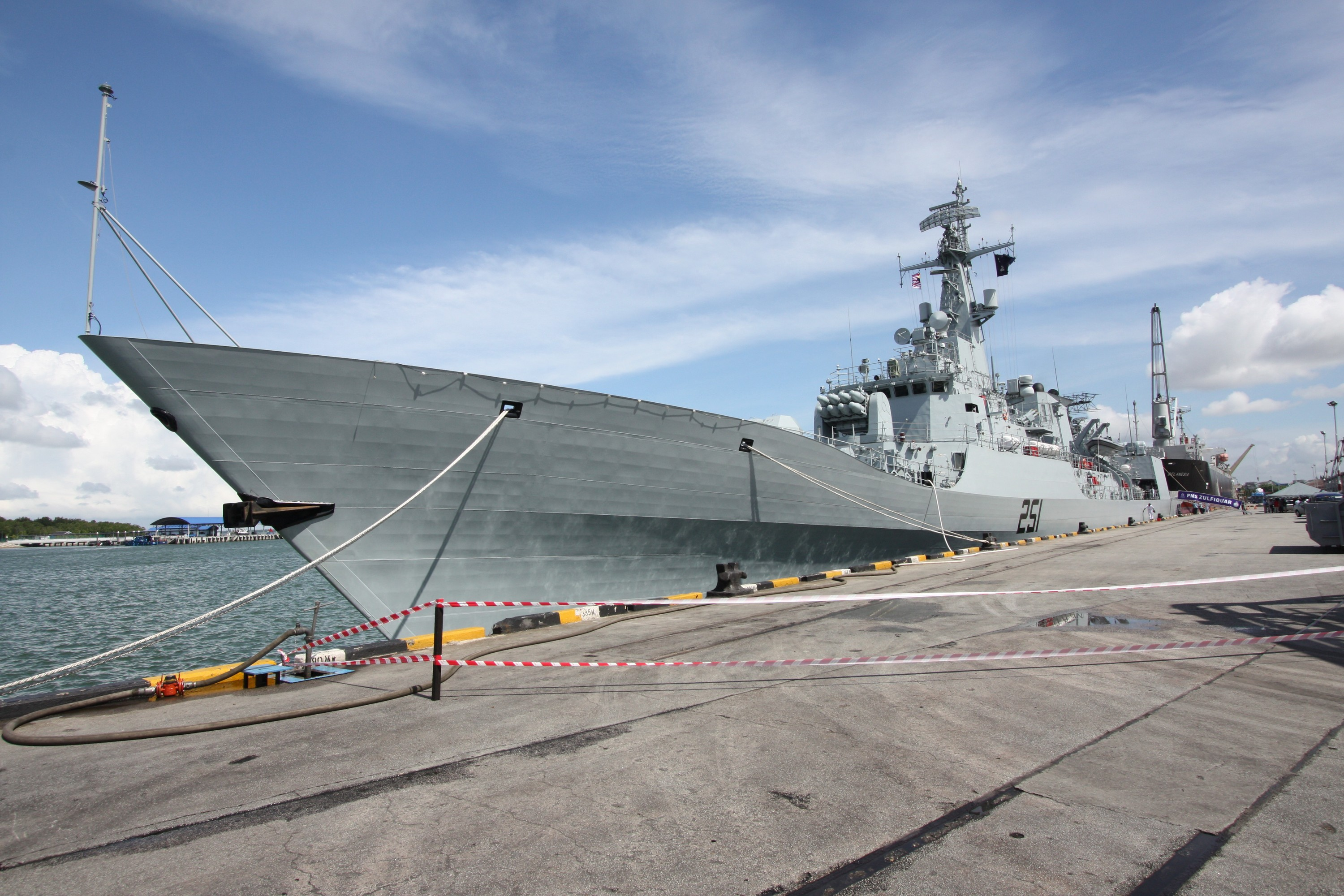
- PNS Zulfiquar anchored in Port Klang in Malaysia in 2009.

Class overview
- Name: Zulfiqar class
- Builders: Hudong–Zhonghua, China; KS&EW Ltd, Pakistan
- Operators: Pakistan Navy
- Preceded by: Tariq class
- Succeeded by: Tughril-class frigate; Jinnah class
- Subclasses: Type 053H3 frigate
- Cost: $750 million USD (4 Ships); $187.5 million USD per unit
- Built: 2006–2009
- In service: 2008–present
- In commission: 2009–present
- Planned: 4
- Completed: 4
- Active: 4

General characteristics
- Type: Guided missile frigate
- Displacement: 2,500 tonnes (standard); 3,144 tonnes (full load)
- Length: 123.2 m (404 ft 2 in)
- Beam: 13.8 m (45 ft 3 in)
- Draught: 3.76 m (12 ft 4 in)
- Propulsion: CODAD; 4 × Pielstick 16PA6STC at 5.1 MW (6,800 hp); 4 × MTU diesels generator set 8V396TE54 at 680 kW (910 hp)
- Speed: 29 knots (54 km/h) maximum
- Range: 4,000 nmi (7,400 km)
- Complement: 15 Officers, 200 Enlists
- Sensors & processing systems: SUR 17 / Type 517 long range radar air surveillance radar; SR-60 / Type 360 Radar air/surface search radar; KH 2007 navigation radar; Atlas ASO-94 Hull Mounted Sonar; 2 x Type 347 CIWS fire-control radar (fore and aft); Type 345 SAM fire-control radar; CIWS electro-optical director; Radar warning receiver suite
- Electronic warfare & decoys: RWD-8 intercept, NJ8I-3 jammer; Decoy flare, chaff launchers
- Armament: Guns: 1 × 76.2 mm calibre AK–176M main gun; 2 × Type 730B CIWS; Missiles: 1 × 8-cell FM-90N SAM launcher; 2 × 4-cell C-802 SSM launchers; Other: 2 × 3-cell ET-52C torpedo launchers; 2 × 6-cell RDC-32 anti-submarine rockets; 1 x 1-cell Anti-ship ballistic missile; 2 x 1-cell cruise missile
- Aircraft carried: 1 × Harbin Z-9EC ASW helicopter
- Aviation facilities: Flight deck and enclosed hangar

The Zulfiqar-class frigate (Urdu: ذوالفقار, lit. 'Sword'), also known as F-22P or in English: Sword class, is a class of multi-mission guided missile frigates, in service with the Pakistan Navy. The class is based on an updated model of the Chinese design, the Type 053H3. The frigates were designed and built jointly in Hudong–Zhonghua Shipbuilding in China and the KS&EW Ltd. in Pakistan.

The frigates perform missions including air defense, enemy interdiction, extraction and patrolling the economic exclusive zone (EEZ).

== History ==
=== Negotiation, procurement, and development ===
After the return of the Garcia-class and Brooke-class frigates in 1994, Pakistan entered in negotiation with China to jointly built and design the class of four frigates in 1996–1999. Initial interests were directed towards procuring the Type 053 and Type 054 frigates in 2004, eventually signing a bilateral agreement with China to design the frigates influenced from both designs at the initial price of $600 million USD with the conclusion of the technology transfer to Pakistan on 4 April 2006.

The contract was expanded with China as the Pakistan Navy ordered to equip the Zulfiquar class with six Z-9EC helicopters with anti-submarine capability and additional ammunition according to their specifications, concluding the final cost at $750 million USD. The Chinese government awarded the contract to the Hudong-Zhonghua Shipyard in Shanghai, where the last three ships were constructed and built, while Pakistan awarded the contract to KS&EW Ltd. for the construction and development of the last ship.

The lead ship, PNS Zulfiquar, was launched in Shanghai on 5 April 2008, and completed several sea trials in China. On the way to Pakistan, Zulfiquar, under the command of Captain Zahid Ilyas paid a goodwill visit to Port Klang in Malaysia in August 2009, and also paid a goodwill visit to Colombo Port in Sri Lanka where she was visited by the Commander of the Sri Lanka Navy, Vice Admiral Thisara Samarasinghe, on 5 September 2009.

PNS Zulfiquar was commissioned into the Pakistan Navy by then-Rear Admiral Asif Sandila (senior fleet commander of the Surface Command), which was docked at the Karachi Port on 15 September 2009.

The second frigate of her class, PNS Shamsheer, was launched on 31 October 2008, and commissioned on 19 December 2009 at Shanghai. PNS Shamsheer reported to its base on 23 January 2010.

The third frigate of her class, PNS Saif, was commissioned in the Navy on 15 September 2010.

The fourth and last frigate PNS Aslat was built with transfer of technology at the KS&EW Ltd. and commissioned on 17 April 2013.

In 2010, Chief of Naval Staff, Admiral Noman Bashir, quoted in the media of the Navy's intention to expand its fleet by procuring additional ships. In 2015, it was reported that Pakistan Navy awarded the contract to the KS&EW Ltd. to build two more Zulfiquar-class frigates, which as of September 2018 are being constructed.

== Design and technology ==
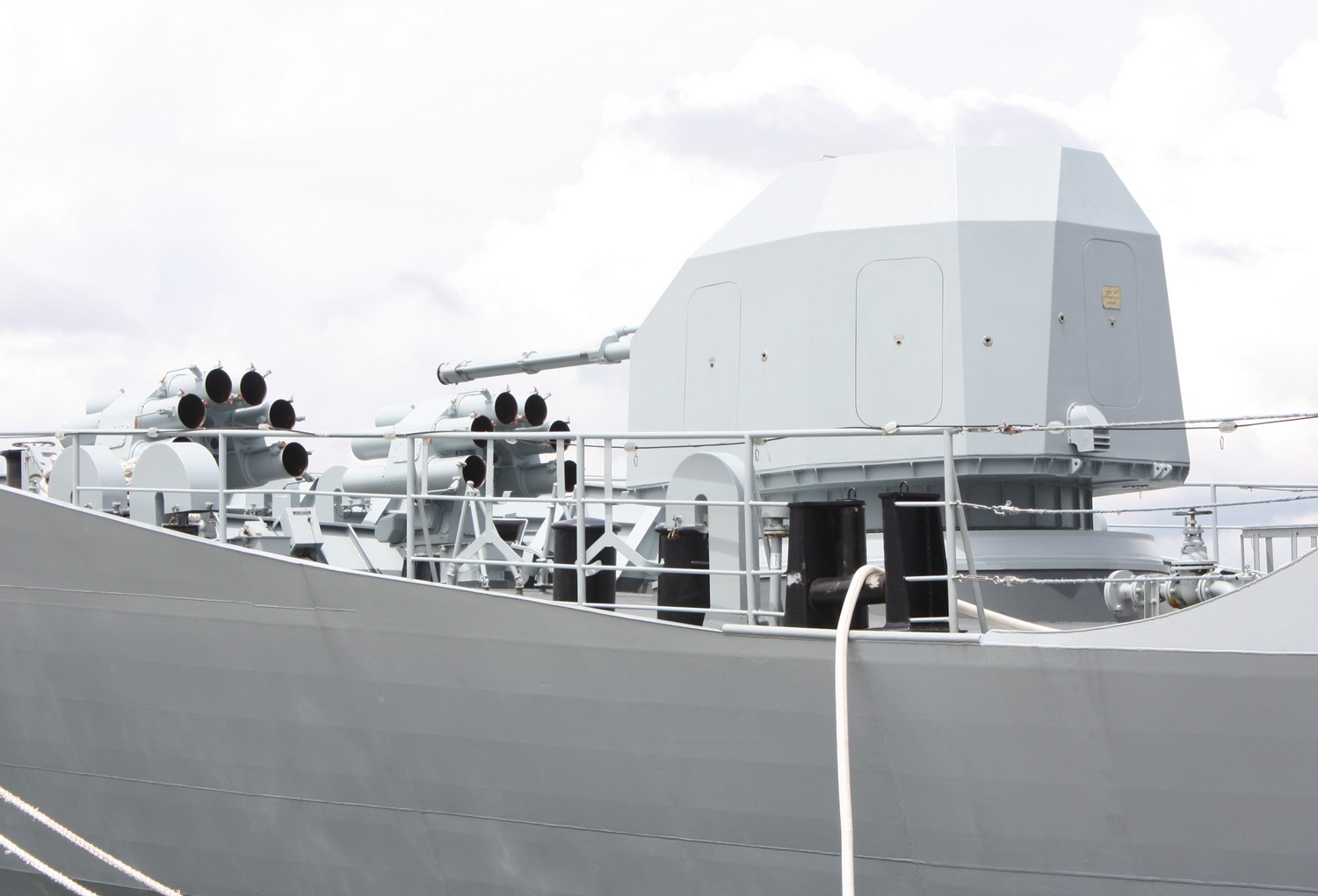
The 76.2 mm gun mounted on the F-22P as main naval artillery.

The Zulfiquar class hull uses many of the radar cross-section reduction features of the Chinese Type 054 frigate to help it evade detection by radar mounted on other ships, aircraft and anti-ship missiles.

The armory features the Chinese engineered Russian patent, AK-176M–a 76.2 mm calibre– being the main artillery gun with the distinction of that the Chinese variant adopts the stealth turret to reduce radar cross-section. The gun is designed to engage enemy warships, aircraft and anti-ship missiles. In front of the main gun are two 6-cell RDC-32, the anti-submarine rocket launchers.

The Zulfiquar class is a guided missile frigate (FFG) with the introduction and the installation of the armament comprises eight C-802 "Eagle Strike", the Chinese manufactured subsonic surface-to-surface missiles, carried in two launchers with four cells each that are fitted between the foremast and the funnel. These containers are also compatible with the CY series anti-submarine rockets and may be loaded with a combination of anti-ship and anti-submarine weapons. In addition, the warships are installed with the FM-90N "Red Flag", a Chinese-built surface-to-air missile system, is fitted between the main deck and main gun.

The launch pad has eight cells each containing one missile and is fitted on a mount that can be elevated and traversed in the direction of the threat. The FM-90N can engage several targets, including supersonic and subsonic sea-skimming missiles, using different guidance modes simultaneously. The system is also designed to engage small targets such as unmanned aerial vehicles (UAV). In 2024, a Zulfiquar-class frigate was used to test and successfully launch a P282 SMASH ballistic missile.

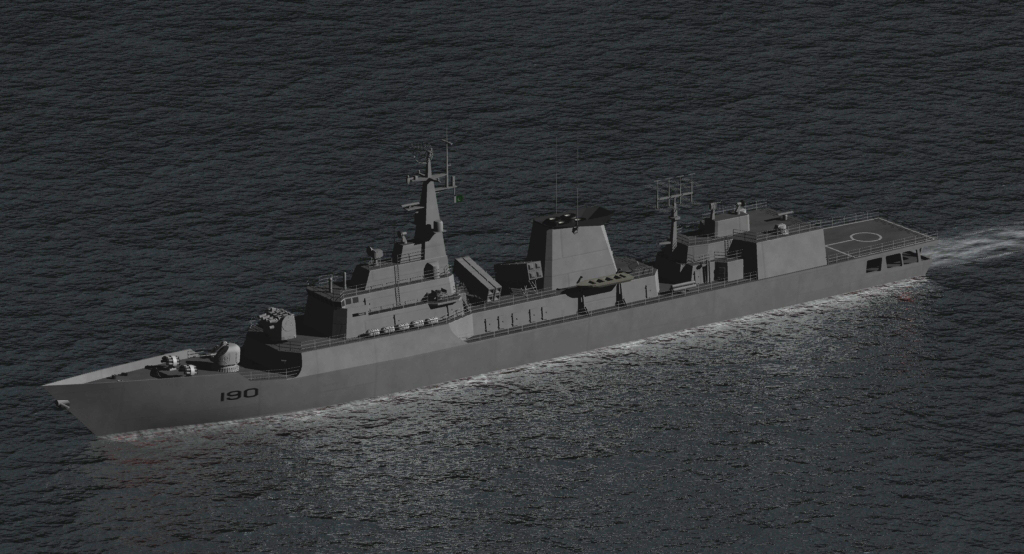
A graphical design of the F-22P on the LightWave 3D CAD.

A single Type 730B, a close-in weapon system (CIWS), is mounted on the aircraft hangar. Comprising two seven-barrel Gatling guns of 30 mm calibre, the F-22P is believed to be the first ship armed with the Type 730B. which uses off-mount sensors such as the Type 347G radar and the OFC-3 electro-optic director.

The guns are mounted side by side on the aircraft hangar, with the off-mount sensors in between. The CIWS can be upgraded with the FL-3000N fire-and-forget missile system by installing up to two single-round FL-3000N launchers on each existing CIWS gun mount.

The Harbin Z-9EC anti-submarine warfare (ASW) helicopter is equipped with a surface-search radar, low frequency dipping sonar, radar warning receiver, doppler navigation system and armed with torpedoes. The helicopter can be armed with one torpedo on the starboard side.

A small antenna on the roof may provide a data-link, allowing the Z-9 to act as a relay for targeting data between the ship and long range anti-ship missiles such as the C-802.

== Ships in class ==
Name	Image	Pennant	Shipyard	Laid down	Launched	Commissioning
Zulfiquar		F251	Hudong–Zhonghua Shipbuilding	12 October 2006	5 April 2008	19 September 2009
Shamsheer		F252	Hudong–Zhonghua Shipbuilding	13 July 2007	31 October 2008	19 December 2009
Saif		F253	Hudong–Zhonghua Shipbuilding	4 November 2008	28 May 2009	15 September 2010
Aslat		F254	Karachi Shipyard & Engineering Works, Ltd.	10 December 2009	16 June 2011	17 April 2013

== Deployments ==
=== War on Terror ===
==== Afghan war and Yemen conflicts ====
The lead warship, PNS Zulfiquar, has been deployed on operations in the War on Terror. She was attacked by AQIS-affiliated militants and rogue Pakistan Navy personnel who attempted to capture the ship and use it to attack US Navy vessels on 6 September 2014. The attack was foiled by Pakistan's Navy SEALs Teams. The attackers had intended to use Zulfiquar's anti-ship missiles to attack the United States Navy Fleet in the Arabian Sea. Ten militants which included four rogue ex-Pakistani navy personnel were killed by Pakistani forces in their efforts to foil the capture attempt. Four other officers who were involved but who did not participate in the attack were later apprehended.

== Gallery ==
PNS Zulfiquar (251), lead ship of the Zulfiquar-class frigates, during a visit to Port Klang, Malaysia, on 27 August 2009:

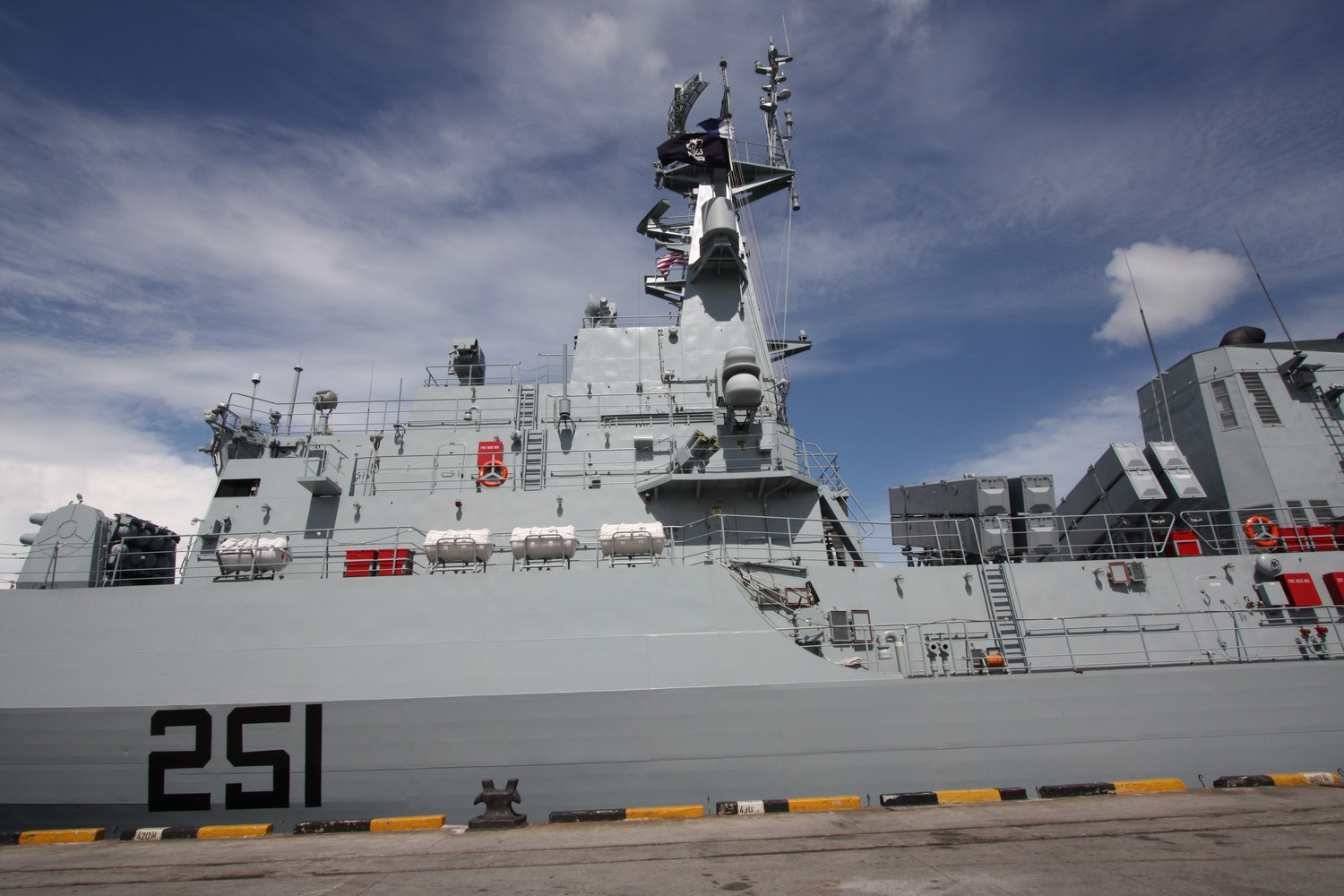
The pennant number of PNS Zulfiquar.

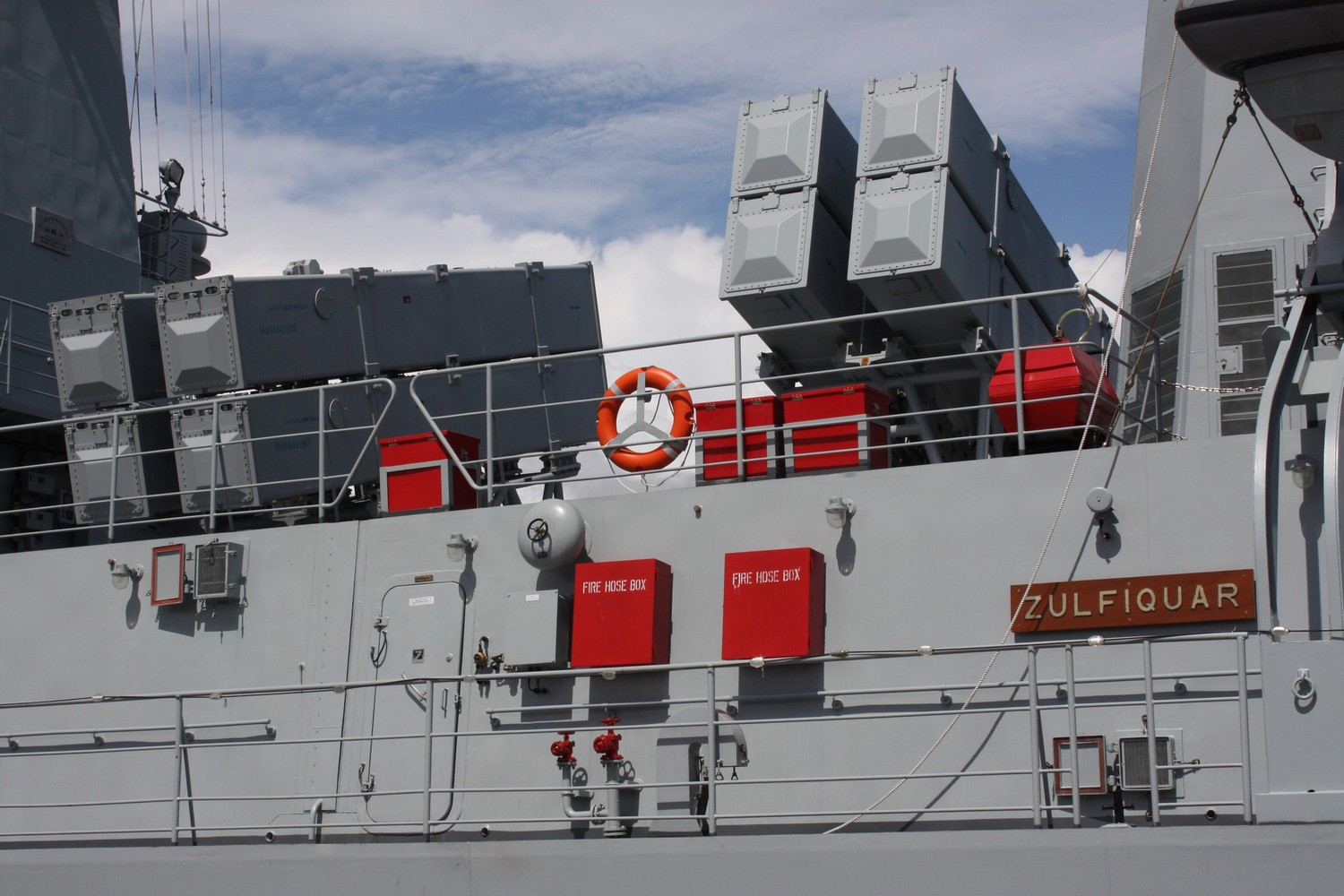
Two 4-cell C-802 anti-ship missile launchers.

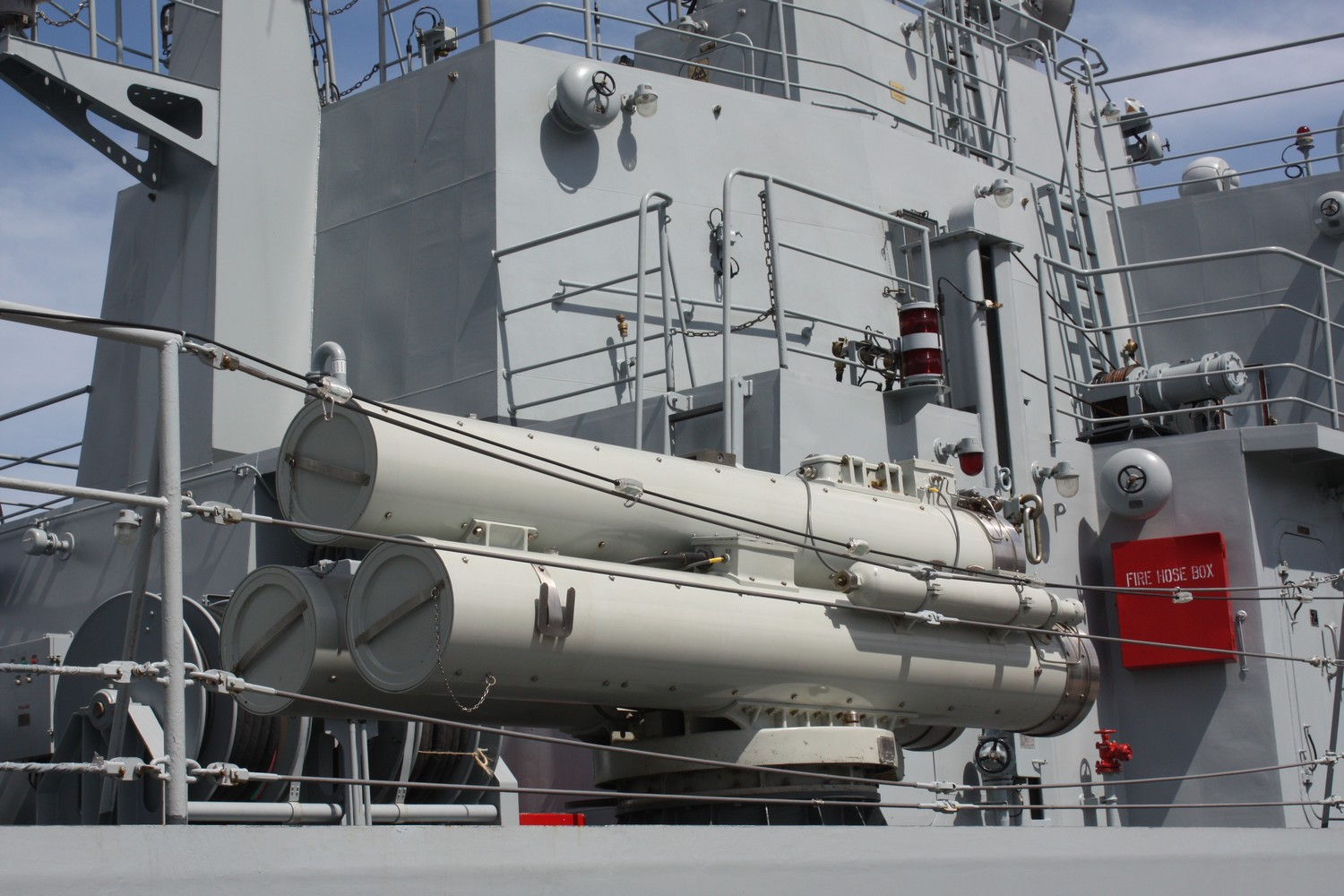
ET-52C torpedo launchers.

Main Mast

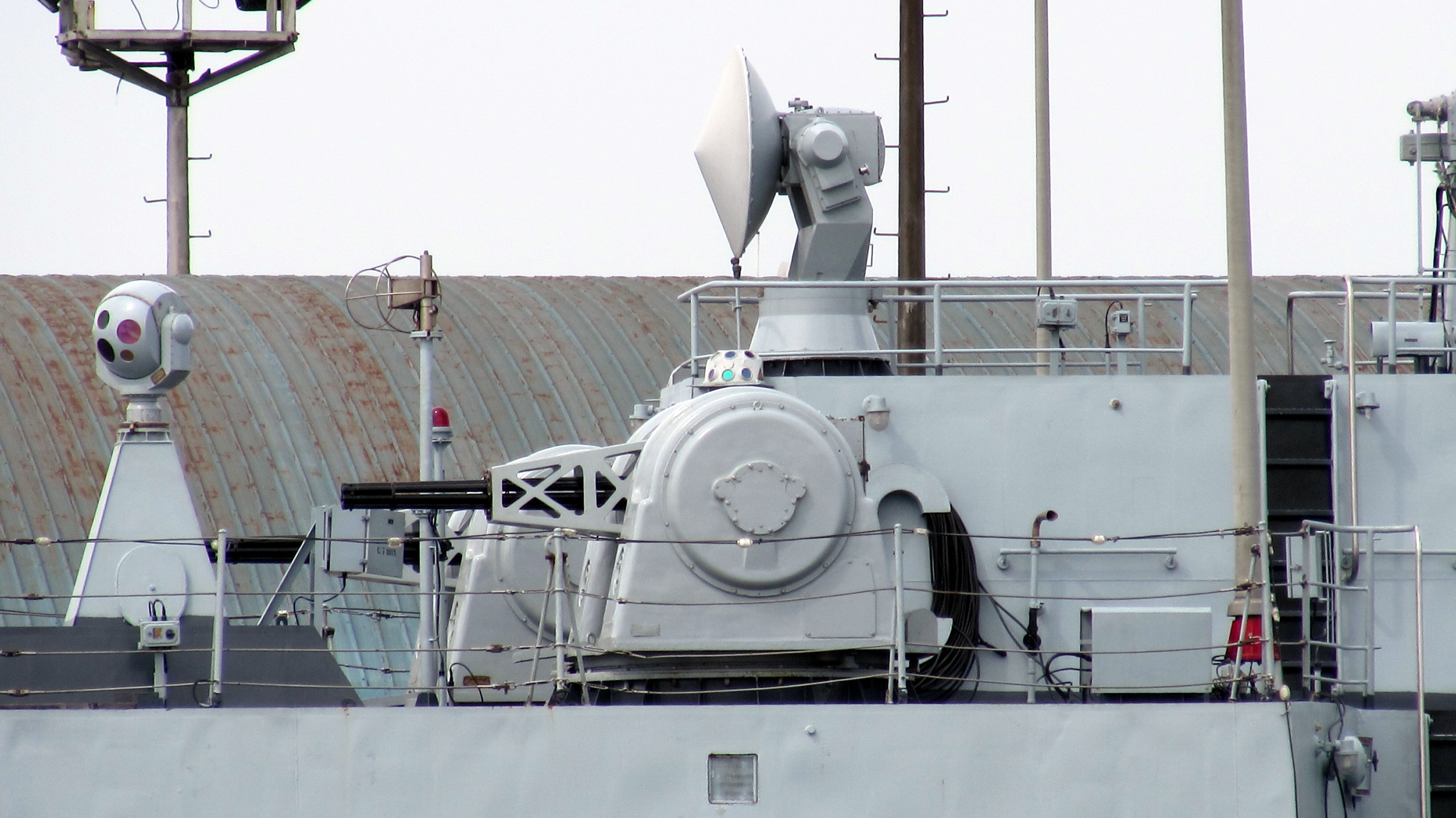
Type 730 CIWS

Type 730 CIWS OFC-3 electro-optical Fire Control Director (FCD).

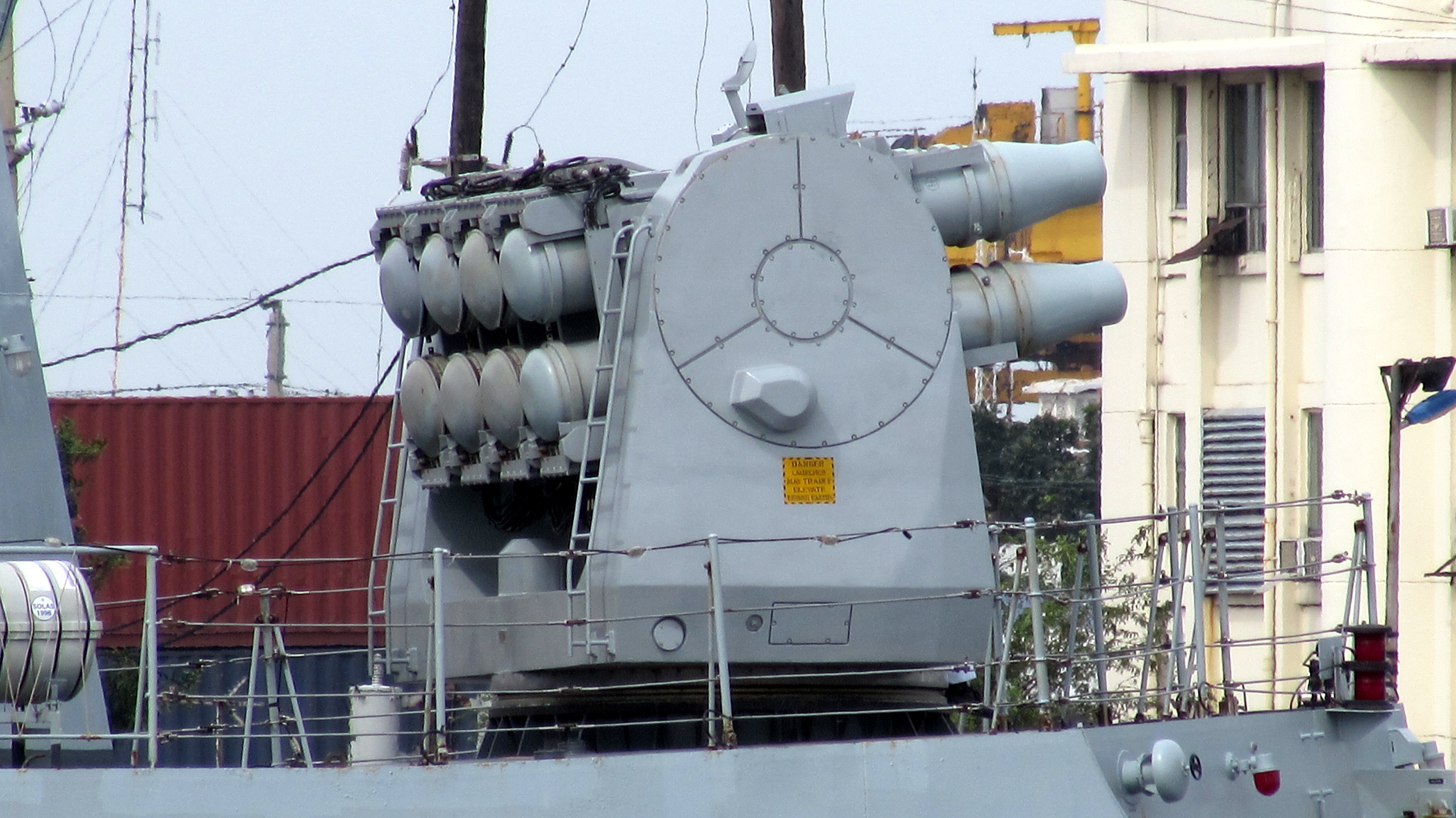
FM90 SAM

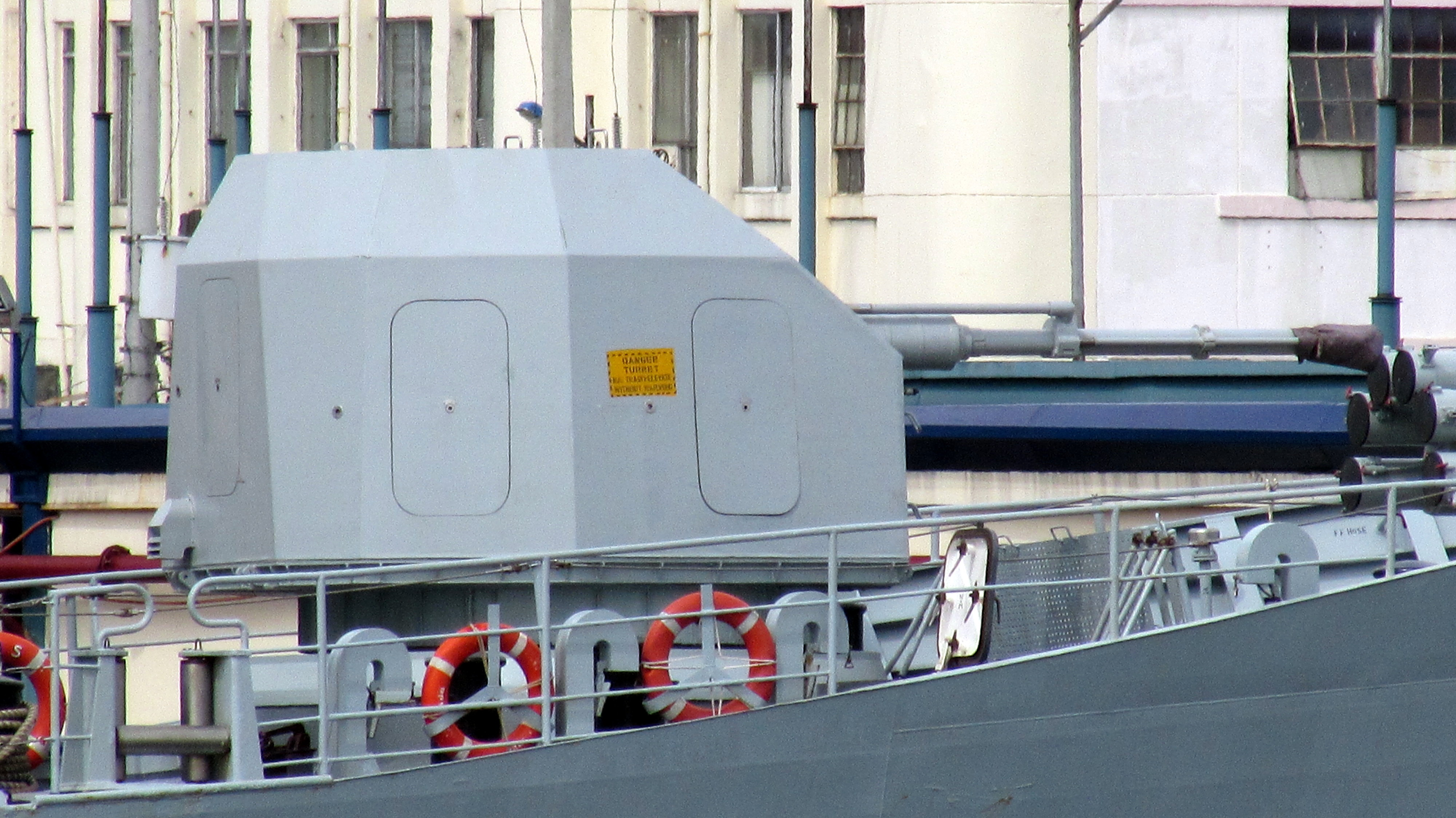
PJ-26 Gun

Type 347 FCR.
