= Type 347 radar =

Chinese fire-control radar

Type 347G

The Type 347G "Rice Bowl" I-band fire-control radar is found on Chinese Navy ships, in conjunction with the Type 76A dual-37mm automatic AA gun. Typically, the system includes 2 Type 347G fire-control radar with optical director, and 4 Type 76A guns.

== Development ==
Development for an air defense radar system begun in July 1974, with design finalized in August 1975, consisted of two radars, the 1st being a search radar designated as Type 347S with S stands for search, and a 2nd fire control radar for guns, designated as Type 347G with G as gun. Design was completed by the 723rd Institute in May 1976 and finalized in October 1977. In the 1980s, China imported the OTOBreda (now OTO-Melara) Twin Fast Forty AAA and Selenia (now AMS) SPG-74 (RTN-20X) fire control system from Italy for evaluation. Although the Chinese navy didn't deploy the twin-40mm AAA, there are some similarities between the Type 347 and the SPG-74 radar, leading some commentators to claim that the Type 347 is based on SPG-74 technology. Subsystems tests on land were completed by the end of 1982. After further tests from November 1986 to September 1987, the system was accepted into service, and Type 347G radar subsequently renamed as Type 347 radar.

The distinct recognition characteristic of the Type 347 radar is the inverse cassegrain antenna with twisted polarization.

Type 347 radar is frequently but erroneously referred by many as either Type 349 or Type 348, because externally, all three radars look very similar, and all three are developed as fire control radar for small caliber guns. In reality, the three radars are different and they can be easily distinguished by the following features: When electro-optics (EO) are integrated with radar, EO is installed on the portside of Type 347 radar antenna, but for Type 348 and Type 349, EO is installed on the starboard side of the radar antenna. Furthermore, when incorporated as part of CIWS, Type 349 is slaved to Type 730 CIWS gun and thus does not rotate, because the gun rotates when searching/tracking. In contrast, Type 348 is not slaved to the Type 76 37mm twin guns, but instead, installed separately from the gun mounts, and thus Type 348 rotates when searching/tracking. The shape of antenna is also an important visual cue to distinguish three radars. The tip of Type 349 radar is a conical, which is missing on Type 347. Instead, the tip of Type 347 radar antenna is a small circular flat surface, missing the tip of the cone. The antenna of Type 348 radar differs from both Type 347 and Type 349 radars in that most of the cone is missing, only the base remains, so the antenna of Type 348 radar has a very large circular flat surface, resulting in Type 348 radar resembles a scaled down version of another larger fire control radar for larger caliber guns (76 mm or greater), Type 344.

== Ships Equipped ==
- Type 051 destroyer
- Type 052 destroyer
- Luhai class destroyer
- Type 053H3 frigate
- Type 037 corvette

== Specifications ==
- System Band: X band
- Range: 30 km against 2 m² RCS aircraft; 15 km against: 0.1 m² ASM
- Tracking accuracy: ≤1mrad
- Beam width: 1.8°
- Tracking coverage: 360° (Az); -25°~85° (El)
- Antenna type: Circular parabolic antenna
- Polarization: Vertical
- Beam width: 1.8°±0.2°
- Transmitter / Receiver
  - Pulse peak consumption: 150 kW
  - NF: <8 dB
- Ambient temperature
  - Antenna: -25–+70 °C
- Power supply
  - 115 V/50 Hz 3-phase AC: 5 kW
  - 115 V/400 Hz 3-phase AC: 1 kW
- Other features:
  - Uses a coherent pulse doppler design
  - Non coherent Moving Target Indicator/Detection (MTI, MTD), CFAR (Constant False Alarm Rate)
  - Antinodding, anti clutter capability (A well advertised feature of the RTN family)

== See also ==
- Chinese radars
- Naval Weaponry of the People's Liberation Army Navy
- Type 730 CIWS
