= Chinese frigate Wenzhou =

Type 054 frigate of the PLA Navy

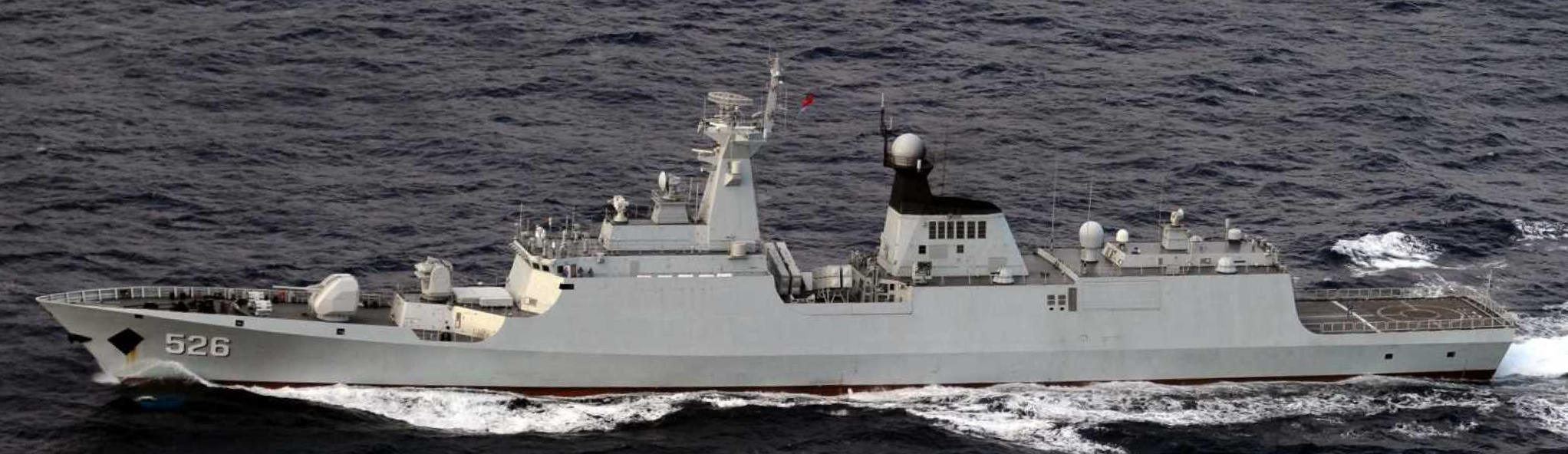
- Wenzhou underway on 13 December 2015

History

China
- Name: Wenzhou
- Namesake: Wenzhou; (温州)
- Builder: Huangpu, Shanghai
- Launched: November 2003
- Commissioned: 26 September 2005
- Home port: Zhoushan
- Identification: Pennant number: 526
- Motto: Chinese: "忠诚，团结，勇敢，制胜！" English: "Loyalty, unity, courage, winning for victory!"
- Nickname(s): Venti（“温迪”）
- Status: Active

General characteristics
- Class & type: Type 054 frigate
- Displacement: 3,900 tons
- Length: 134 m (440 ft)
- Beam: 16 m (52 ft)
- Draught: 5 m (16 ft)
- Propulsion: Combined diesel and diesel (CODAD), 4× SEMT Pielstick 16 PA6 STC diesels, 5700 kW (7600+ hp @ 1084 rpm) each
- Speed: 27 kn (50 km/h) estimated
- Range: 8,025 nautical miles (14,900 km) estimated
- Sensors & processing systems: Type 363S (Thomson-CSF DRBV-15 Sea Tiger) 2D air/surface search radar, E/F band; Type 345 (Thomson-CSF Castor-II) fire-control radar for HQ-7 SAM, I/J band; Type 347G Rice Lamp fire control radar for AK-630 CIWS guns, I-band; MR-36A surface search radar, I-band; Type MR34 100 mm gun fire control radar; 2× Racal RM-1290 navigation radars, I-band; MGK-335 medium frequency active/passive sonar system; ZKJ-4B/6 (developed from Thomson-CSF TAVITAC) combat data system; HN-900 Data link (Chinese equivalent of Link 11A/B, to be upgraded); SNTI-240 SATCOM
- Electronic warfare & decoys: Type 922-1 radar warning receiver; HZ-100 ECM & ELINT system
- Armament: 2× 4-cell YJ-83 (C-803) anti-ship missiles; 1× HQ-7 8-cell SAM launcher; 1× Type 210 100 mm naval gun; 4× AK-630 6-barrel 30 mm CIWS guns; Triple 324 mm YU-7 ASW torpedoes; Rocket launchers, possibly ASW rockets or decoy rockets
- Aircraft carried: 1 Kamov Ka-28 'Helix' or Harbin Z-9C
- Aviation facilities: hangar

Wenzhou (526) is a Type 054 frigate of the People's Liberation Army Navy. She was commissioned on 26 September 2005.

== Development and design ==
The Type 054 has a stealthy hull design with sloped surfaces, radar absorbent materials, and a reduced superstructure clutter.

The main anti-ship armament were YJ-83 sea-skimming anti-ship cruise missiles in two four-cell launchers. It retained the HQ-7 SAM, an improved version of the French Crotale, from the preceding Type 053H3; the HQ-7 had a ready-to-fire 8-cell launcher, with 16 stored in the automatic reloader. Short range defence was improved with four AK-630 CIWS turrets. A 100 mm main gun, also based on a French design, was mounted.

== Construction and career ==
Wenzhou was launched in November 2003 at the China State Shipbuilding Corporation in Shanghai. She was commissioned on 26 September 2005.

On January 1, 2013, several PLA Navy East China Sea Fleet ships, including the Wenzhou and Ma'anshan, conducted offensive and defensive exercises in a certain sea area. On February 5, the Japanese government protested to China, claiming that Wenzhou used fire control radar to target and warn the Japanese Maritime Self-Defense Force's carrier-borne helicopter on January 19. In late June 2013, Wenzhou and Fuzhou were formed into small-scale combat operations, and in the form of shift duty, a real-force confrontation exercise in a complex electromagnetic environment was carried out in a certain sea area. In mid-September 2013, Wenzhou went to a certain sea area to perform combat readiness patrol missions, patrolling offshore derricks, and conducted training in non-war military operations such as temporary seizures, tracking and surveillance.
