= Chinese frigate Sanming =

Type 053H3 frigate of the PLA Navy

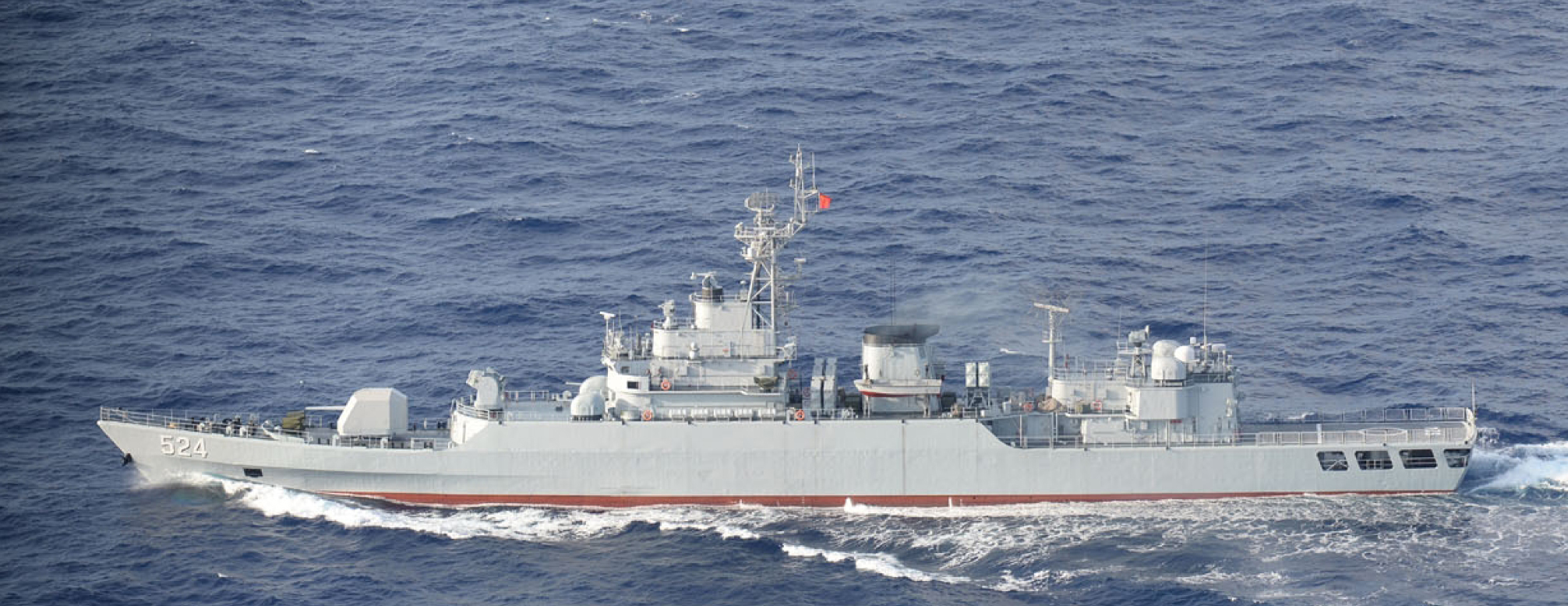
- Sanming underway on 12 June 2015

History

China
- Name: Sanming; (三明)
- Namesake: Sanming
- Builder: Hudong-Zhonghua Shipbuilding, Shanghai
- Launched: December 1998
- Commissioned: 25 December 1999
- Identification: Pennant number: 524
- Status: Active

General characteristics
- Class & type: Type 053H3 frigate
- Displacement: 2,250 tons(empty); 2,393 tons (full)
- Length: 112 m (367.5 ft)
- Beam: 12.4 m (40.7 ft)
- Draft: 4.3 m (14.1 ft)
- Propulsion: 2 shafts, CODAD: 2 x 18E390VA diesel at 23,600 hp (17,600 kW); 2 x MTU diesel at 8,715 hp (6,499 kW)
- Speed: 28 knots (52 km/h; 32 mph)
- Range: 5,000 mi (8,000 km) at 15 to 16 knots (28 to 30 km/h)
- Complement: 168 (30 officers)
- Sensors & processing systems: Type 360 Radar (SR60) Surface Search, E/F band; Type 517H-1 (Knife Rest) 2D long-range air search, A-band; Type 345 Radar (MR35) HQ-7 Surface-to-air missile fire-control, J-band; Type 352 Radar (Square Tie) surface search and AShM fire control, I-band; Type 343GA (Wasp Head) fire control radar for main gun, G/H-band; 2 × Type 347G/EFR-1 (Rice Lamp) dual 37 mm AA gun fire control, I-band; 2 × Racal RM-1290 Navigation radar, I-band
- Electronic warfare & decoys: Data link: HN-900 (Chinese equivalent of Link 11A/B, to be upgraded); Communication: SNTI-240 SATCOM; Combat Data System: ZKJ-3C; RWD-8 (Jug Pair) intercept; Type 981-3 EW Jammer; SR-210 Radar warning receiver; Type 651A IFF; 2 × Type 946/PJ-46 15-barrel decoy rocket launchers
- Armament: 2 × 4-cell C-802A Anti-ship missile; 1 × 8-cell FM-90 Surface-to-air missile system; 1 × PJ33A dual 100 mm gun; 4 × Type 76A dual 37 mm AA guns; 2 × 6-tube Type 3200 ASW rocket launchers; 2 × DC racks
- Aircraft carried: AgustaWestland AW109
- Aviation facilities: Hangar and helipad

Sanming (524) is a Type 053H3 frigate of the People's Liberation Army Navy. She was commissioned on 25 December 1999.

== Development and design ==
The ship's anti-aircraft defense is mainly the Haihongqi-7 with short-range point defense. The foreign trade model of the missile is FM-90N, with a total length of 3 meters, a bullet diameter of 156 mm, a wingspan of 0.55 meters, a launch weight of 84.5 kg, and a maximum speed of 2.3. Mach, the shooting height is 15-5500 meters, the maximum range is 10 to 12 kilometers, the minimum range is 500 meters, and the kill probability is about 70%. It can intercept low-altitude targets with a flying height of less than 5 meters, and the system response speed is 6.5 seconds. After the modification, it was replaced with an 8-unit Haihongqi-10 near defense missile.

The quadruple Eagle Strike-83 anti-ship missile is the standard equipment of the PLA naval destroyer. It is 6.86 meters long, 1.18 meters wingspan, 0.36 meters bullet diameter, total weight 850 kg, warhead weight 165 kg, and sea skimming altitude 35 Meters, at a distance of 5 kilometers from the target, it drops to 5-7 meters from the sea, the maximum range is 150-180 kilometers, and the single shot hit rate is more than 95%.

The hangar and in front of the bridge are equipped with two 76A double-barreled 37mm anti-aircraft guns. After modification, it was replaced with two simplified versions of H/PJ-12 7-tube 30mm naval guns (fire control radar adopts centralized arrangement).

== Construction and career ==
Sanming was launched in December 1998 at the Hudong-Zhonghua Shipyard in Shanghai. Commissioned on 25 December 1999 into the East Sea Fleet.

On March 5, 2007, Sanming and Lianyungang formed a Chinese navy formation and arrived in Karachi, Pakistan, to participate in the "Peace-07" multinational naval exercise held in the North Arabian Sea from March 6 to 13.

== Gallery ==
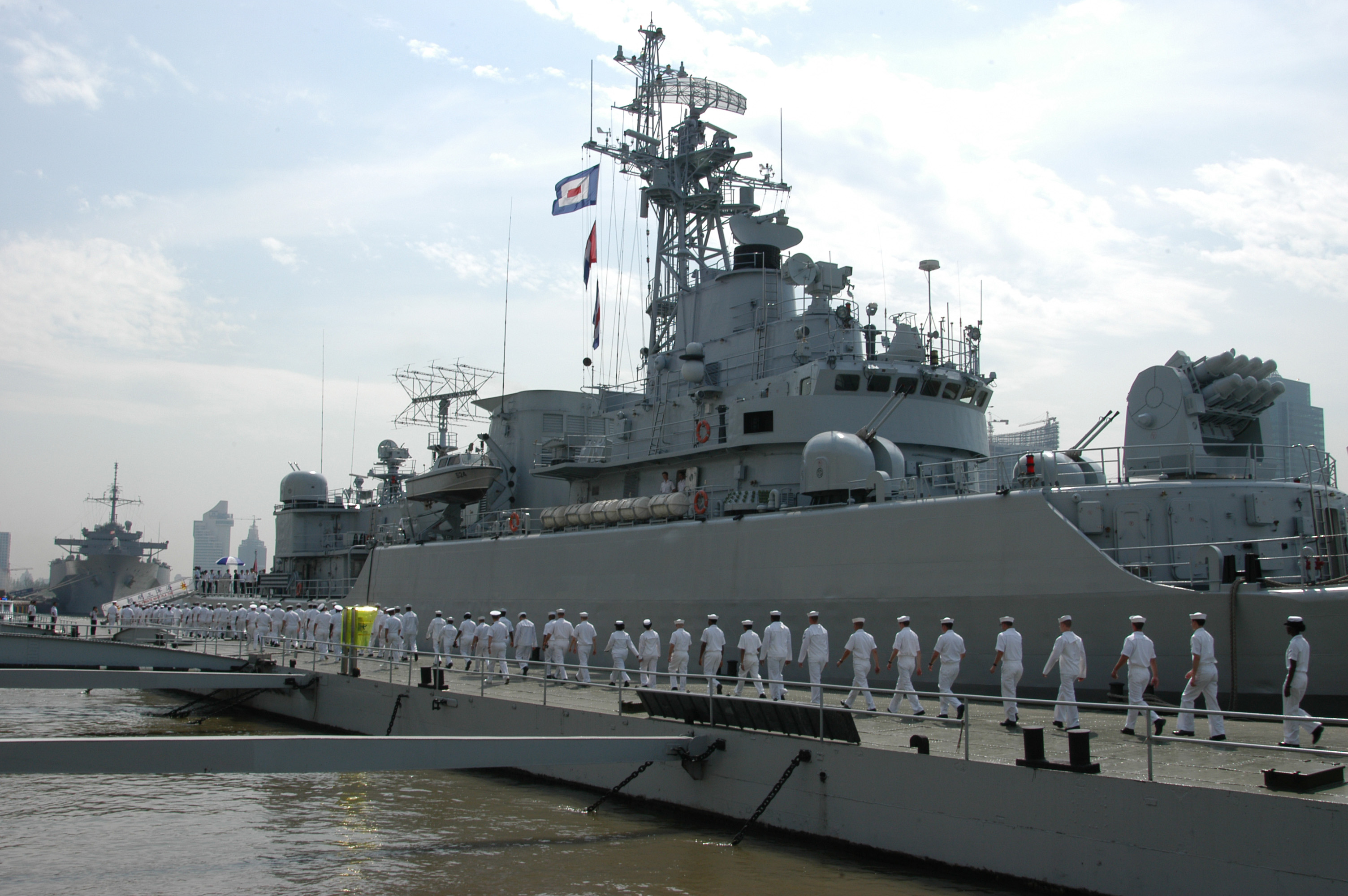
Sanming on 28 June 2006

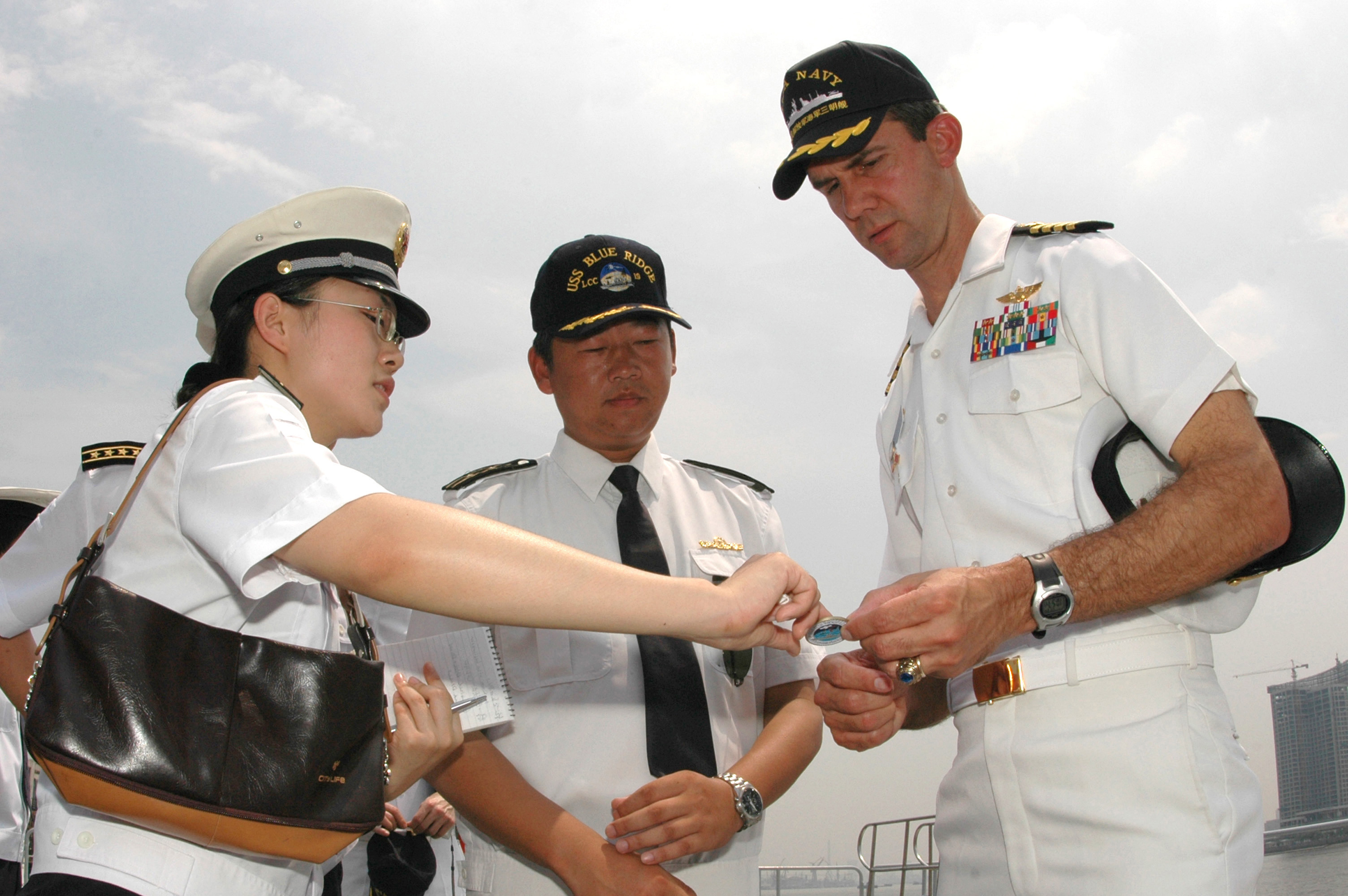
Captain Jeff Bartkoski of USS Blue Ridge presents a command coin to Sanming on 28 June 2006

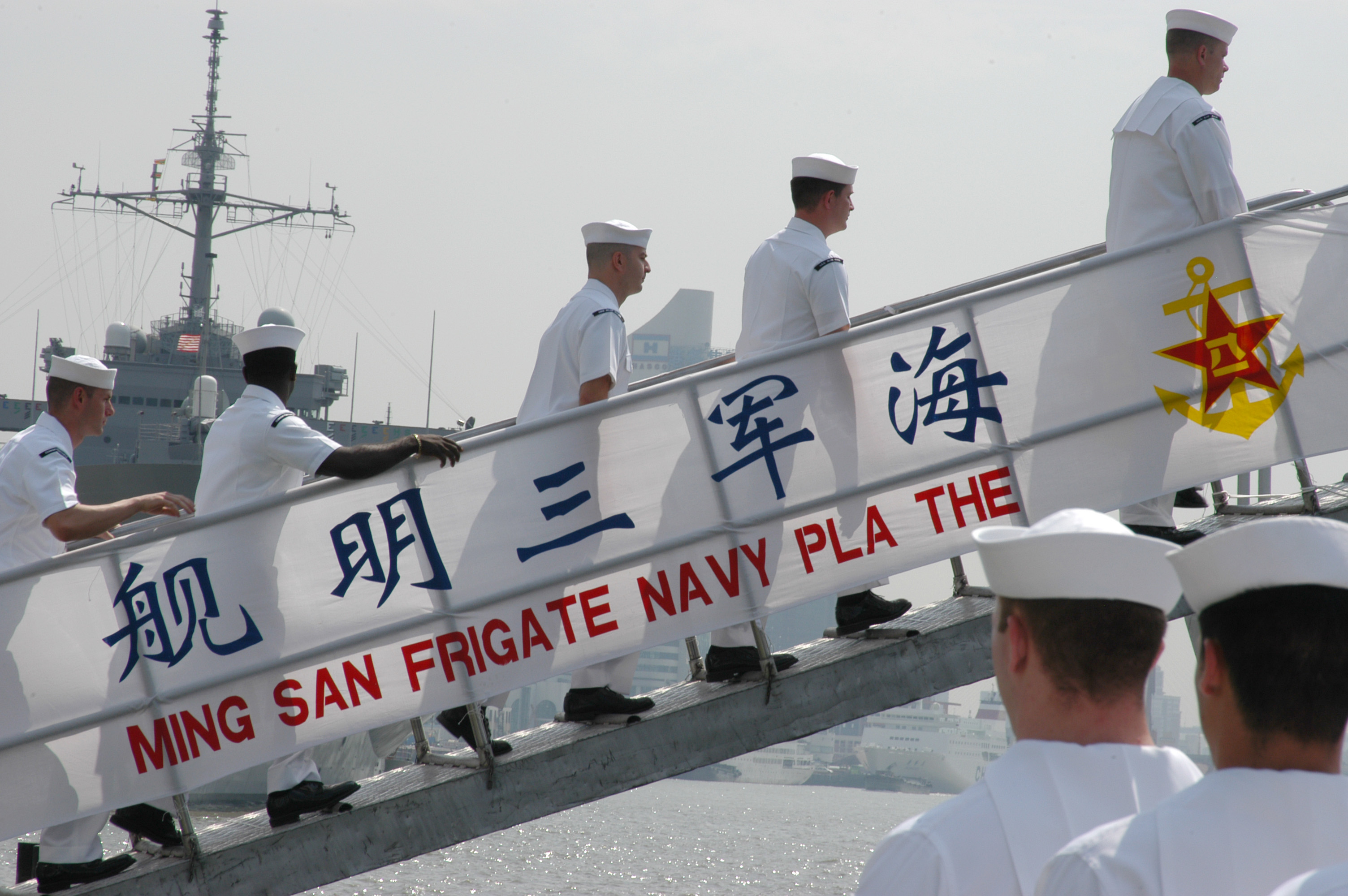
Sailors of USS Blue Ridge visited Sanming on 28 June 2006

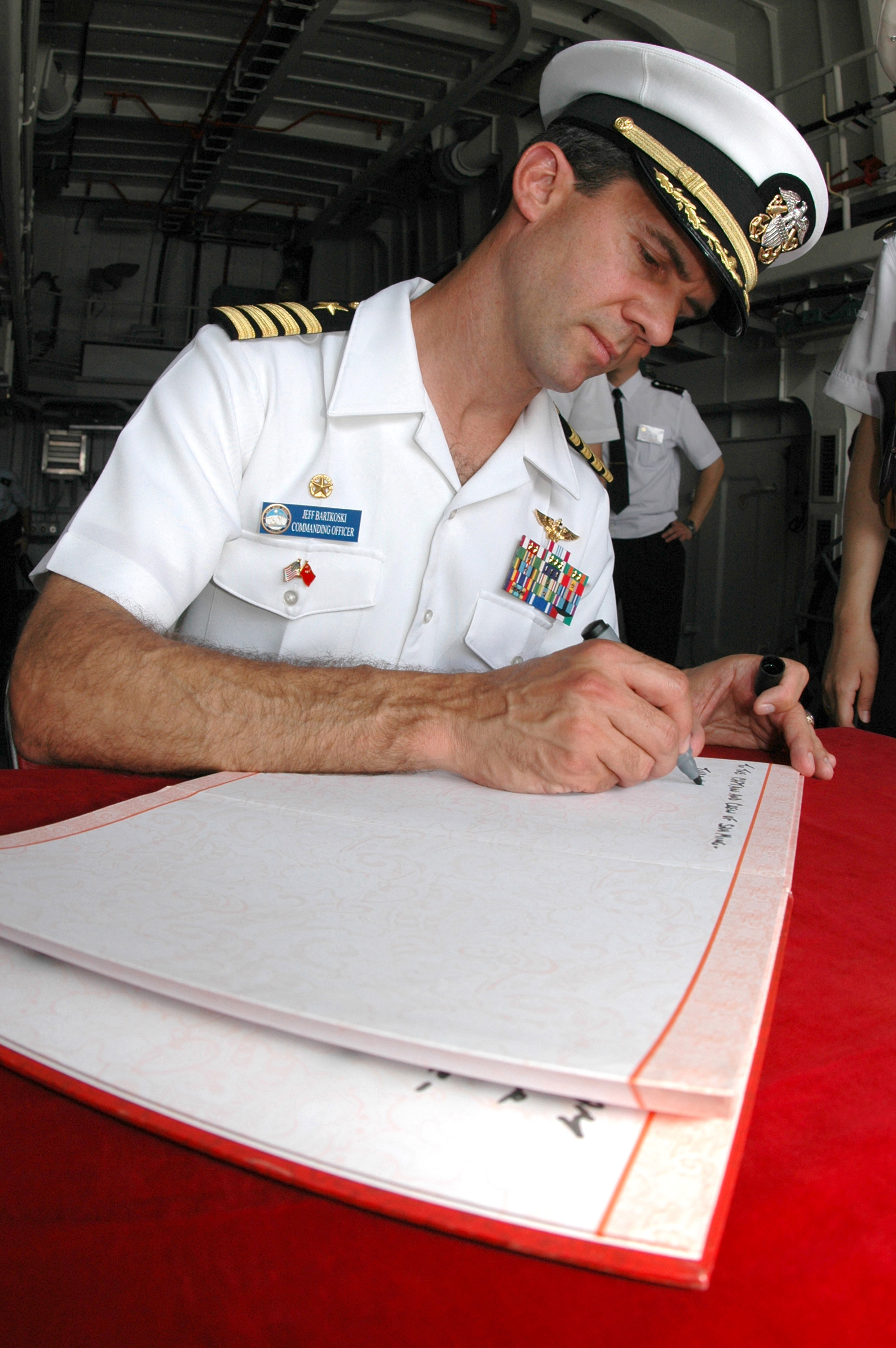
Captain Jeff Bartkoski of USS Blue Ridge visited Sanming on 28 June 2006

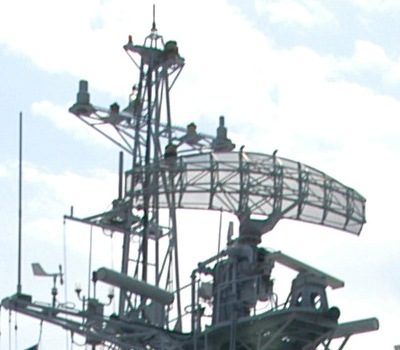
Sanming's Type 360 radar

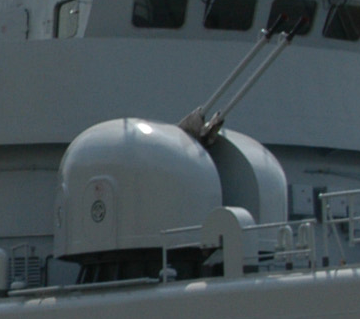
Sanming's Type 76A 37mm gun
