= BNS Umar Farooq (2019) =

Type 053H3 frigate of the Bangladesh Navy

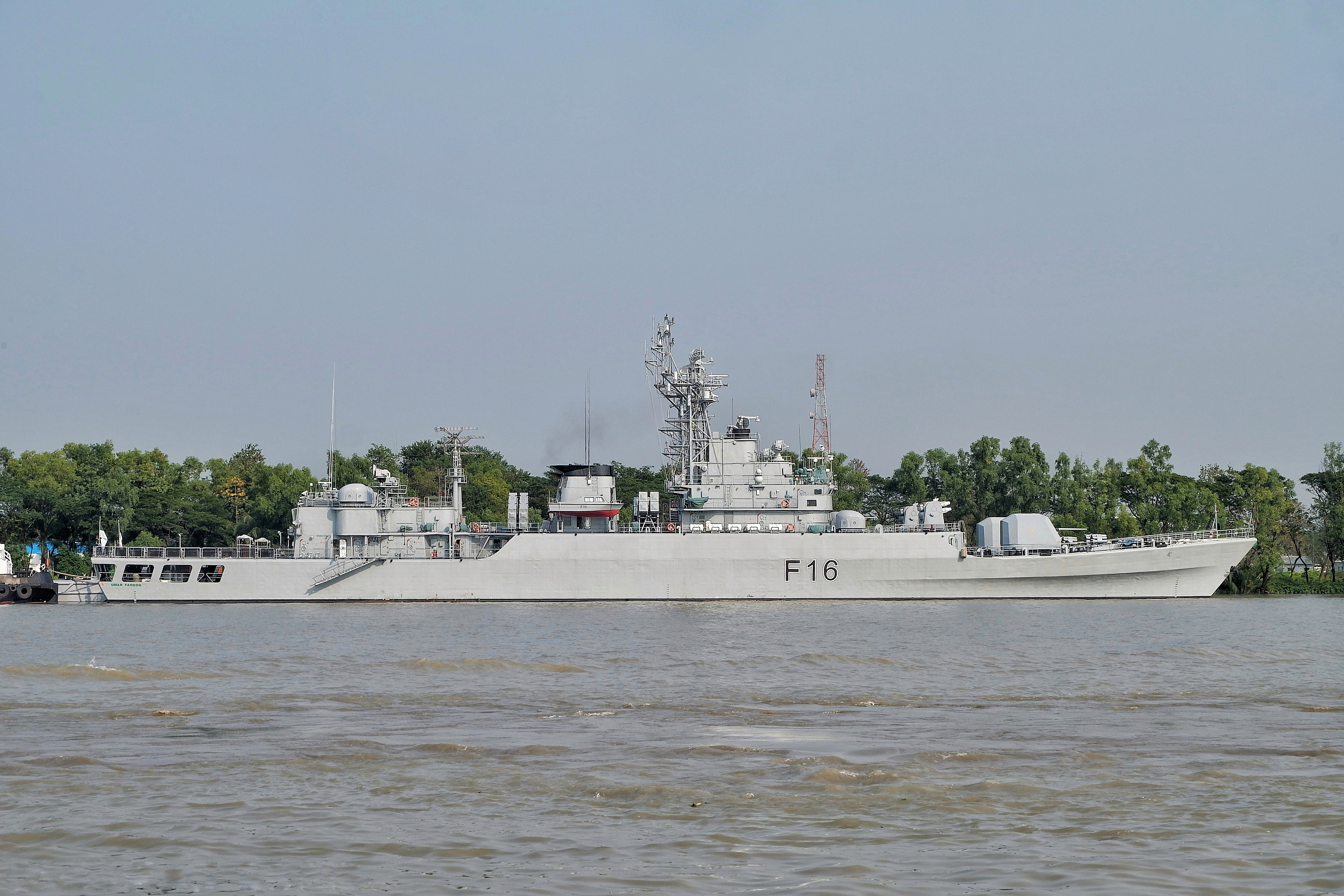
- BNS Umar Farooq (F-16)

History

China
- Name: BNS Umar Farooq
- Namesake: Umar Ibn Khattab
- Launched: October 1997
- Commissioned: January 1998
- Decommissioned: 5 August 2019
- Identification: Pennant number: 522
- Fate: Sold to the Bangladesh Navy

Bangladesh
- Name: Umar Farooq
- Namesake: Omar
- Acquired: 18 December 2019
- Commissioned: 5 November 2020
- Identification: Pennant number: F-16
- Status: Active

General characteristics
- Class & type: Type 053H3 frigate
- Displacement: 2,250 tons (empty); 2,393 tons (full)
- Length: 112 m (367 ft 5 in)
- Beam: 12.4 m (40 ft 8 in)
- Draft: 4.3 m (14 ft 1 in)
- Propulsion: 2 shafts, CODAD: 2 x 18E390VA diesel at 23,600 hp (17,600 kW); 2 x MTU diesel at 8,715 hp (6,499 kW)
- Speed: 28 knots (52 km/h; 32 mph)
- Range: 5,000 nmi (9,300 km; 5,800 mi) at 15 to 16 knots (28 to 30 km/h; 17 to 18 mph)
- Complement: 168 (30 officers)
- Sensors & processing systems: Type 360 Radar (SR60) surface search, E/F band; Type 517H-1 (Knife Rest) 2D long-range air search, A-band; Type 345 Radar (MR35) HQ-7 surface-to-air missile fire-control, J-band; Type 352 Radar (Square Tie) surface search and AShM fire control, I-band; Type 343GA (Wasp Head) fire control radar for main gun, G/H-band; 2 × Type 347G/EFR-1 (Rice Lamp) dual 37 mm AA gun fire control, I-band; 2 × Racal RM-1290 navigation radar, I-band
- Electronic warfare & decoys: Data link: HN-900 (Chinese equivalent of Link 11A/B, to be upgraded); Communication: SNTI-240 SATCOM; Combat Data System: ZKJ-3C; RWD-8 (Jug Pair) intercept; Type 981-3 EW Jammer; SR-210 Radar warning receiver; Type 651A IFF; 2 × Type 946/PJ-46 15-barrel decoy rocket launchers
- Armament: 2 × 4-cell C-802A anti-ship missile; 1 × 8-cell FM-90 surface-to-air missile system; 1 × PJ33A dual 100 mm gun; 4 × Type 76A dual 37 mm AA guns; 2 × 6-tube Type 3200 ASW rocket launchers; 2 × DC racks
- Aircraft carried: AgustaWestland AW109
- Aviation facilities: Hangar

BNS Umar Farooq (Bengali: বানৌজা ওমর ফারুক) is a Type 053H3 frigate of the Bangladesh Navy. She has served in the Bangladesh Navy since 2020. The ship is named after the second Rashidun Caliph Omar.

== History ==
The Type 053H3 frigate BNS Umar Farooq was previously known as Lianyungang (522) which served with the People's Liberation Army Navy (PLAN) in the East Sea Fleet. The ship was launched in October 1997 and commissioned to the PLAN in January 1998. On 5 August 2019, she was decommissioned to be sold to the Bangladesh Navy. The handover took place on 18 December 2019. The ship started the journey to her new home, Bangladesh, on 23 December 2019, reaching the Port of Mongla on 9 January 2020. The Bangladesh Navy commissioned her at Chittagong on 5 November 2020.

BNS Umar Farooq participated in Exercise Milan-2022, a multilateral exercise hosted by Indian Navy, held from 25 February to 4 March 2022 at Visakhapatnam. She left home to take part in the exercise on 22 February 2022. The ship returned to Chattogram on 6 March 2022.

== Armament ==
The ship is armed with two quad-pack C-802A anti-ship missile launchers. The C-802A missiles have range of 180 kilometres (110 mi). She also carries one PJ33A dual 100 mm gun to engage surface targets. For anti-aircraft role, the ship carries an eight cell FM-90 surface-to-air missile launcher system. Besides, four Type 76A dual 37 mm AA guns are also there. For anti-submarine operations, the ship has two 6-tube Type 3200 ASW rocket launchers and two depth charge (DC) racks and four DC projectors. Type 946/PJ-46 15-barrel decoy rocket launchers are also in the ship for anti-ship missile defence.

== See also ==
- List of active ships of the Bangladesh Navy
