= Type 054 frigate =

Ship class

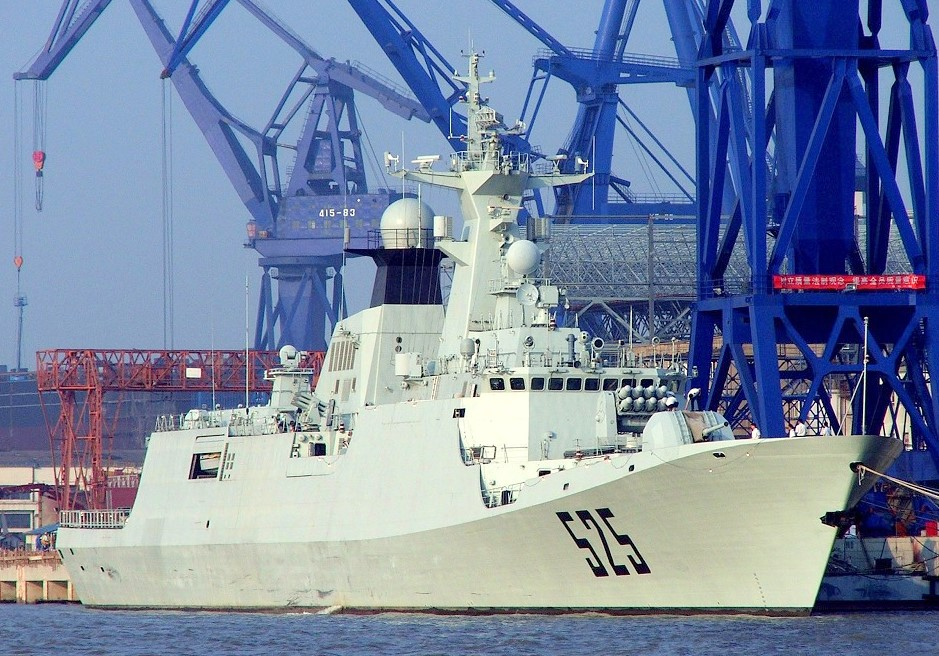
- Type 054 frigate Ma'anshan (appearance before the modernization)

Class overview
- Builders: Hudong-Zhonghua Shipbuilding; Huangpu Shipyard
- Operators: People's Liberation Army Navy Surface Force
- Preceded by: Type 053H3 frigate
- Succeeded by: Type 054A frigate
- Built: 1999–2005
- In commission: 2005–present
- Completed: 2
- Active: 2

General characteristics
- Type: Frigate
- Displacement: 3,900 tons (full)
- Length: 134 m (440 ft)(CCTV)
- Beam: 16 m (52 ft) (CCTV)
- Draught: 5 m (16 ft)
- Propulsion: Combined diesel and diesel (CODAD), 4× SEMT Pielstick 16 PA6 STC diesels, 5700 kW (7600+ hp @ 1084 rpm) each
- Speed: 27 kn (50 km/h) estimated
- Range: 8,025 nautical miles (14,900 km) estimated
- Sensors & processing systems: Type 363S (Thomson-CSF DRBV-15 Sea Tiger) 2D air/surface search radar, E/F band; Type 345 (Thomson-CSF Castor-II) fire-control radar for HQ-7 SAM, I/J band; Type 347G Rice Lamp fire control radar for AK-630 CIWS guns, I-band; MR-36A surface search radar, I-band; Type MR34 100 mm gun fire control radar; 2× Racal RM-1290 navigation radars, I-band; MGK-335 medium frequency active/passive sonar system; ZKJ-4B/6 (developed from Thomson-CSF TAVITAC) combat data system; HN-900 Data link (Chinese equivalent of Link 11A/B, to be upgraded); SNTI-240 SATCOM
- Electronic warfare & decoys: Type 922-1 radar warning receiver; HZ-100 ECM & ELINT system
- Armament: 2× 4-cell YJ-83 (C-803) anti-ship missiles; 1 × HQ-10 short-range SAM 24-cell launcher; 1× Type 210 100 mm naval gun; 4× AK-630 6-barrel 30 mm CIWS guns; Triple 324 mm YU-7 ASW torpedoes; Rocket launchers, possibly ASW rockets or decoy rockets; Before 2020 refit: 1× HQ-7 8-cell SAM launcher (replaced by 24-cell launcher HQ-10 short-range SAM)
- Aircraft carried: 1 Kamov Ka-28 'Helix' or Harbin Z-9C
- Aviation facilities: hangar

The Type 054 (NATO Codename Jiangkai I) is a class of Chinese frigates that were commissioned in the People's Liberation Army Navy Surface Force in 2005. They superseded the Type 053H3 frigates. Only two ships, Ma'anshan (525), and Wenzhou (526), were completed before production switched to the VLS equipped improved Type 054A frigate.

== Design ==
The Type 054 has a stealthy hull design with sloped surfaces, radar absorbent materials, and a reduced superstructure clutter.

The main anti-ship armament were YJ-83 sea-skimming anti-ship cruise missiles in two four-cell launchers. It retained the HQ-7 SAM, an improved version of the French Crotale, from the preceding Type 053H3; the HQ-7 had a ready-to-fire 8-cell launcher, with 16 stored in the automatic reloader. Short range defence was improved with four AK-630 CIWS turrets. A 100 mm main gun, also based on a French design, was mounted.

Both ships were powered by four CODAD Type 16 PA6 STC marine diesel engines designed by SEMT Pielstick, each generating 6,330 hp. Licenses for the engines were sold to China in April 2002, where they were built by the Shaanxi Diesel Engine Factory. Other reports claimed each ship was powered by two (or four) Type 16 PA STC and two MTU 20V 956TB92 diesels.

=== Comparison with La Fayette class ===
The Type 054 resembled the French La Fayette-class frigates in shape and displacement. In addition, the Chinese used French, or French-derived, electronics and weapons. The French exported these systems to China in the 1980s, and later granted production licences. These systems were similar to those used on the La Fayettes in the 1980s.

The succeeding Type 054A frigates incorporated a larger proportion of more-advanced indigenous systems.

== Operations ==
Ma'anshan and Wenzhou deployed from Zhoushan on 21 February 2011 to undertake an anti-piracy patrol off Somalia. They were the eighth such Chinese patrol and, following Wenzhou's pennant number, gained the semi-compatible Task Force designation 'Task Force 526'. Commodore Han Xiaohu commanded the flotilla from Wenzhou. En route the flotilla made a stop at Karachi, before setting sail again on 13 March 2011. The ships were joined by replenishment ship Qiandaohu (886), which was already deployed with the preceding flotilla.

== Ships of class ==
Number	Pennant number	Name	Builder	Laid down	Launched	Commissioned	Fleet	Status
1	525	马鞍山 / Ma'anshan	Hudong	December 2001	11 September 2003	18 February 2005	East Sea Fleet	Active
2	526	温州 / Wenzhou	Huangpu	February 2002	30 November 2003	26 September 2005	East Sea Fleet	Active

== See also ==
- List of frigate classes in service

Equivalent frigates of the same era

- Formidable class
- Valour class
- Project 11356R
- Incheon class
- Fridtjof Nansen class
- Absalon class
