= BNS Abu Ubaidah =

History

China
- Name: CNS Putian
- Namesake: Putian
- Builder: Hudong Shipyard, Shanghai
- Launched: June 1998
- Commissioned: December 1999
- Decommissioned: 2019
- Identification: Pennant number: 523
- Fate: Sold to Bangladesh

History

Bangladesh
- Name: BNS Abu Ubaidah
- Acquired: 18 December 2019
- Commissioned: 5 November 2020
- Identification: Pennant number: F 19
- Status: Active

General characteristics
- Class & type: Type 053H3 frigate
- Displacement: 2,250 tons(empty); 2,393 tons (full)
- Length: 112 m (367.5 ft)
- Beam: 12.4 m (40.7 ft)
- Draft: 4.3 m (14.1 ft)
- Propulsion: 2 shafts, CODAD: 2 x 18E390VA diesel at 23,600 hp (17,600 kW); 2 x MTU diesel at 8,715 hp (6,499 kW)
- Speed: 28 knots (52 km/h; 32 mph)
- Range: 5,000 mi (8,000 km) at 15 to 16 knots (28 to 30 km/h)
- Complement: 168 (30 officers)
- Sensors & processing systems: Type 360 Radar (SR60) Surface Search, E/F band; Type 517H-1 (Knife Rest) 2D long-range air search, A-band; Type 345 Radar (MR35) HQ-7 Surface-to-air missile fire-control, J-band; Type 352 Radar (Square Tie) surface search and AShM fire control, I-band; Type 343GA (Wasp Head) fire control radar for main gun, G/H-band; 2 × Type 347G/EFR-1 (Rice Lamp) dual 37 mm AA gun fire control, I-band; 2 × Racal RM-1290 Navigation radar, I-band
- Electronic warfare & decoys: Data link: HN-900 (Chinese equivalent of Link 11A/B, to be upgraded); Communication: SNTI-240 SATCOM; Combat Data System: ZKJ-3C; RWD-8 (Jug Pair) intercept; Type 981-3 EW Jammer; SR-210 Radar warning receiver; Type 651A IFF; 2 × Type 946/PJ-46 15-barrel decoy rocket launchers
- Armament: 2 × 4-cell C-802 Anti-ship missile; 1 × 8-cell FM-90 Surface-to-air missile system; 1 × PJ33A dual 100 mm gun; 4 × Type 76A dual 37 mm AA guns; 2 × 6-tube Type 3200 ASW rocket launchers; 2 × DC racks
- Aircraft carried: AgustaWestland AW109
- Aviation facilities: Hangar

BNS Abu Ubaidah is a Type 053H3 frigate serving in the Bangladesh Navy since 2020. The ship is named after one of the Rashidun army commander Abu Ubaidah ibn al-Jarrah.

== History ==
The Type 053H3 frigate BNS Abu Ubaidah was previously known as Putian (523) when it served with the People's Liberation Army Navy (PLAN) in the East Sea Fleet. It was commissioned in PLAN in December 1999. In 2019, the ship was decommissioned and sold to the Bangladesh Navy. The ship was handed over to the Bangladesh Navy on 18 December 2019. She started her journey to Bangladesh on 23 December 2019, reaching the port of Mongla on 9 January 2020. She was commissioned to the Bangladesh Navy on 5 November 2020.

== Armament ==
The ship is armed with two quad-pack C-802A anti-ship missile launchers. The C-802A missiles have range of 180 kilometres (110 mi). It also carries one PJ33A dual 100 mm gun to engage surface targets. For anti-aircraft role, the ship carries an eight cell FM-90 Surface-to-air missile launcher system. Besides, four Type 76A dual 37 mm AA guns are also there. For anti-submarine operations, the ship has two 6-tube Type 3200 ASW rocket launchers and two depth charge (DC) racks and four DC projectors. Type 946/PJ-46 15-barrel decoy rocket launchers are also in the ship for anti-ship missile defence.

== See also ==
- List of active ships of the Bangladesh Navy
