= Type 052 destroyer =

Class of Chinese guided missile destroyers

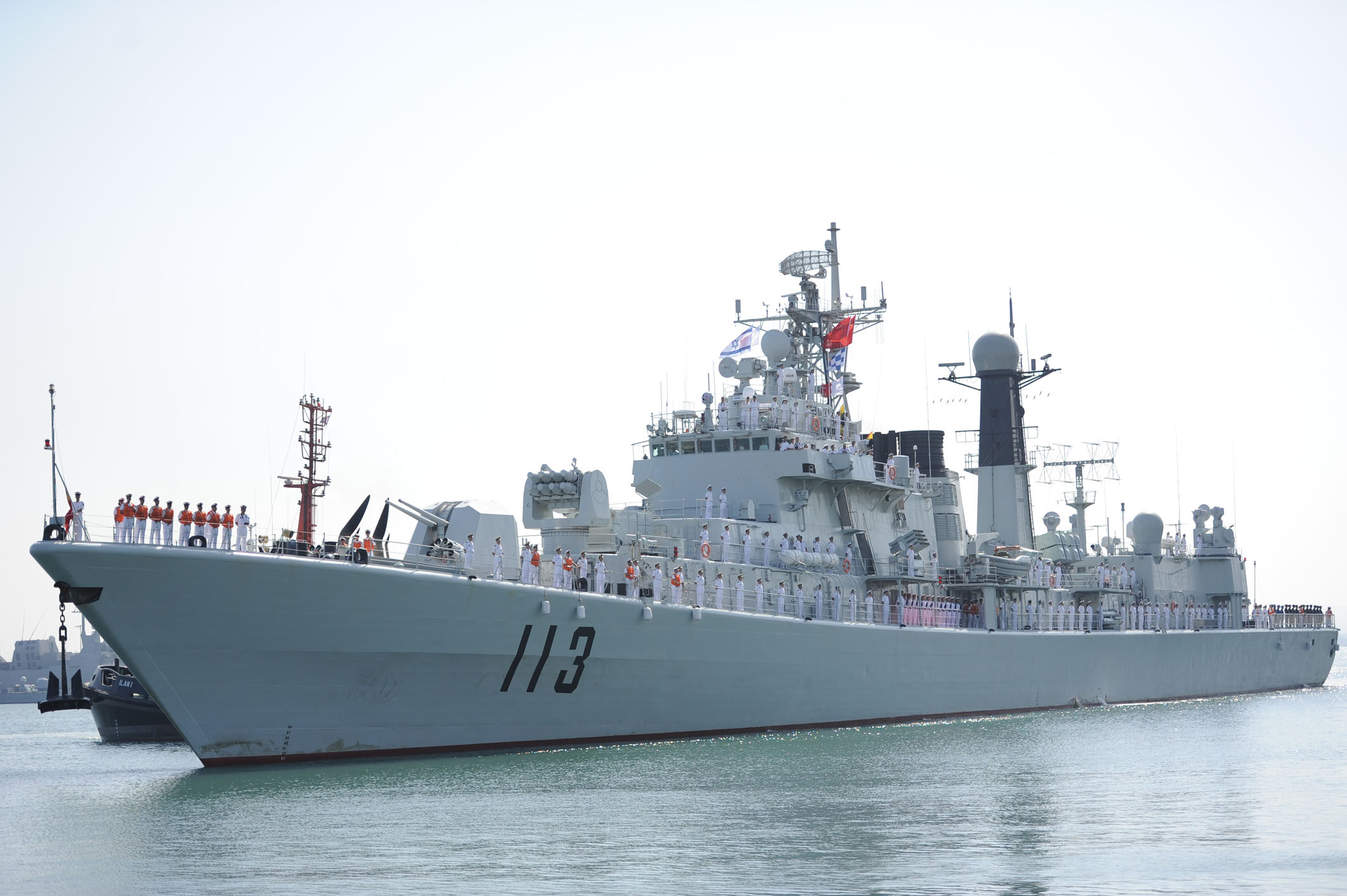
- Qingdao at Haifa port, Israel in 2012

Class overview
- Builders: Jiangnan Shipyard
- Operators: People's Liberation Army Navy Surface Force
- Preceded by: Type 051
- Succeeded by: Type 052B (based on hull family); Type 051B (based on commissioning date)
- Built: 1990 – 1996
- In service: 1994 – present
- Completed: 2
- Active: 1
- Retired: 1

General characteristics
- Type: Guided-missile destroyer
- Displacement: 4,674 tons
- Length: 144 m (472 ft 5 in)
- Beam: 16 m (52 ft 6 in)
- Draught: 5.1 m (16 ft 9 in)
- Propulsion: 2 x General Electric LM2500 gas turbines (55,000 shp (41,000 kW)) (112); 2 x Zorya-Mashproekt DA80 gas turbines (48,600 shp (36,200 kW)) (113); 2 x MTU 12V 1163 TB83 diesels (8,840 shp (6,600 kW))
- Speed: 31 kn (57 km/h; 36 mph)
- Range: 5,000 nmi (9,300 km; 5,800 mi) at 15 kn
- Complement: 266
- Sensors & processing systems: Type 517B air search radar; Type 363S air/surface search radar; Type 364 surface search radar; Type 344 fire control radar; Type 345 fire control radar; DUBV 23 hull mounted sonar; Linear towed array sonar
- Electronic warfare & decoys: Rapids (ESM); Scimitar (ECM)
- Armament: 4 × 4 YJ-83 anti-ship missiles; 1 × 8-cell HQ-7 SAM; 1 × twin 100 mm/56 H/PJ-33B gun; 2 x Type 730 CIWS; 2 x triple 324 mm Whitehead B515 torpedo tubes carrying Yu-7; 2 x 12-tube FQF 2500 ASW rocket launchers
- Aircraft carried: 2 helicopters: Harbin Z-9C
- Aviation facilities: Landing platform; Hangar; DCN Samahe 110N helicopter landing system

The Type 052 (NATO/OSD Luhu-class destroyer) is a class of destroyers developed in the People's Republic of China (PRC) for the People's Liberation Army Navy (PLAN). The Type 052 was an intermediate between the obsolescent Type 051 and the modern Type 052B destroyers. They were the first PLAN destroyers powered by gas turbines, and the first PLAN ships with modern combat direction systems (CDS). They were also part of the first generation of PLAN warships armed with surface-to-air missiles in the form of the short-range Crotale (called HQ-7 in Chinese service).

The Type 052 used subsystems imported from the United States and the European Union. The embargo after the 1989 Tiananmen Square protests and massacre ended the supply of and support for those subsystems, limiting production to two ships and likely affecting their operating efficiency due to system integration issues. Afterward, China turned to Russia and Ukraine for technology.

== Programme ==
The Type 052 was the first PLAN warship where the CDS was designed before the ship. The CDS, possible the ZKJ-6 based on the Italian IPN-10 or IPN-20, began development in 1983 and underwent land-based testing in December 1986. Two ships were ordered in 1985, but delayed by export orders to Thailand. The first, Harbin, was laid down in November 1990 and commissioned in July 1994. Qingdao was commissioned in March 1996.

In 2003, Harbin was refitted with a low radar profile 100mm gun turret in 2003; Qingdao followed in 2005.

A major refit began in 2010 for Harbin and Qingdao in 2011 which included changes to sensors and weapons, gas turbine replacement, and some hull work.

== Design ==
=== Machinery ===
The ships were completed with different gas turbines due to the embargo; Harbin with two General Electric LM2500s from the United States, and Qingdao with two Zorya-Mashproekt DA80s from Ukraine.

=== Sensors ===
The original sensors included the Type 518 air search radar, the Type 362 search radar, and the French DUBV-43 variable depth sonar. These were replaced during the 2010 refit with the Type 517 radar, the Type 362 radar, and a linear towed array sonar respectively.

=== Weapons ===
The ships were armed with an octuple HQ-7/Crotale launcher, and a total of 32 missiles. France agreed to sell the missile systems in 1986, and they were delivered after October 1990.

Four Type 76A twin 37 mm guns were installed at construction. They were removed during 2010 refit, and the aft pair replaced by a pair of Type 730 CIWS.

=== Other ===
The CDS installed on the Type 052 is unclear. One ship may have received the Thomson-CSF TAVITAC; the PRC bought two TAVITACs from France in the 1980s. The TAVITAC may be known as, or modified into, the ZKJ-5 CDS in PRC service. The other ship may have received the ZKJ-6.

The quarterdecks were built open, and enclosed during the 2010 refit.

The ships may have had severe survivability issues like earlier PLAN warships. Observations by foreign visitors to Harbin in March 1997 suggested limited damage control capability and crew safety features.

== Operational history ==
Qingdao participated in the PLAN's first cruise to circumnavigate Earth in 2002. German technicians were flown in to repair its diesel engines during the cruise. The first Type 052 destroyer Harbin was decommissioned in 28 Aug 2026.

== Ships of the class ==
Number	Pennant number	Name	Namesake	Builder	Launched	Commissioned	Fleet	Status
1	112	哈尔滨 / Harbin	City of Harbin, provincial capital of Heilongjiang	Jiangnan Shipyard	October 1991	July 1994	North Sea Fleet	Decommissioned in 28 Aug 2026.
2	113	青岛 / Qingdao	City of Qingdao	Jiangnan Shipyard	October 1993	March 1996	North Sea Fleet	Active

== Gallery ==
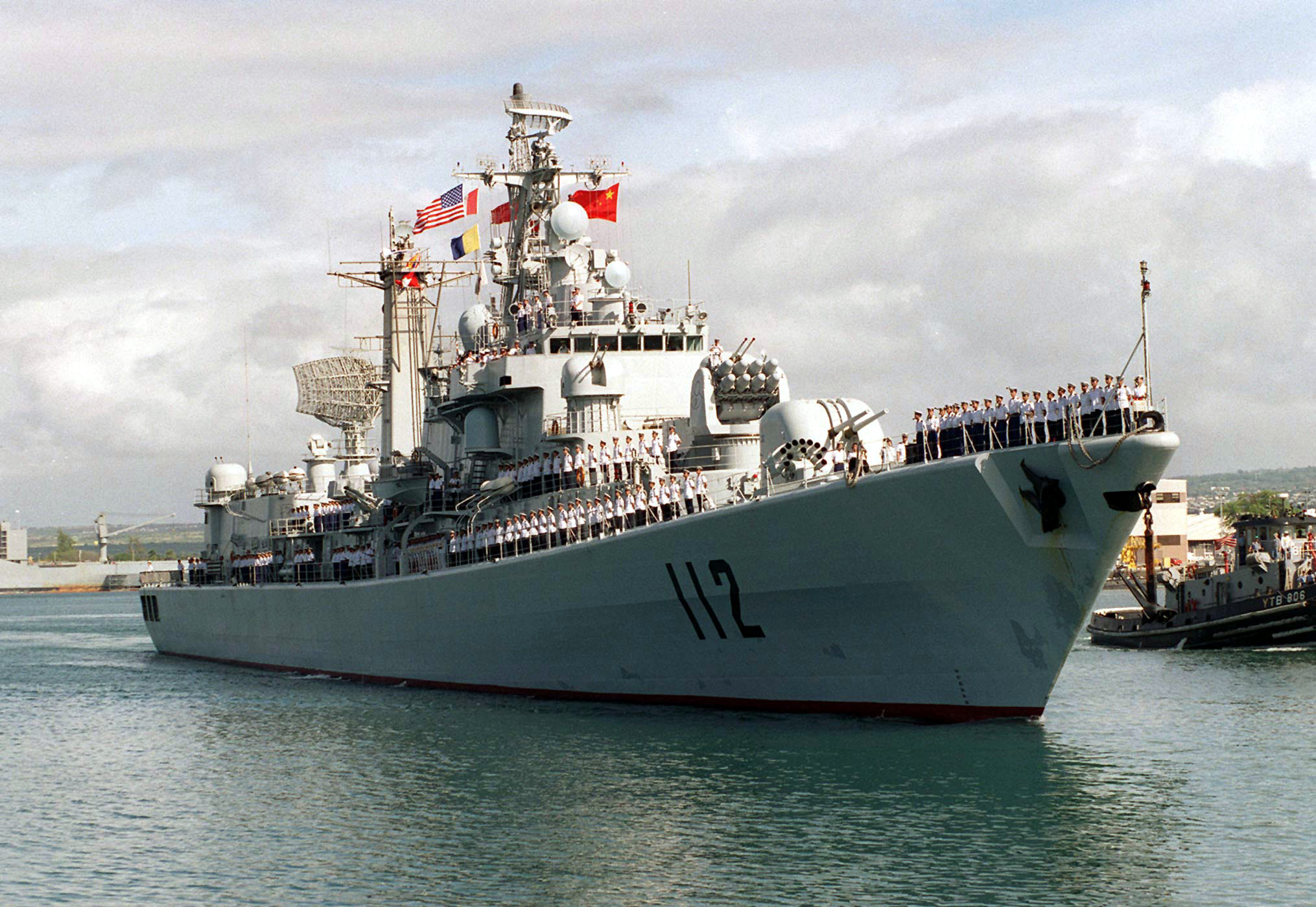
Harbin at Pearl Harbor, Hawaii, in 1997 with the original main gun turret.

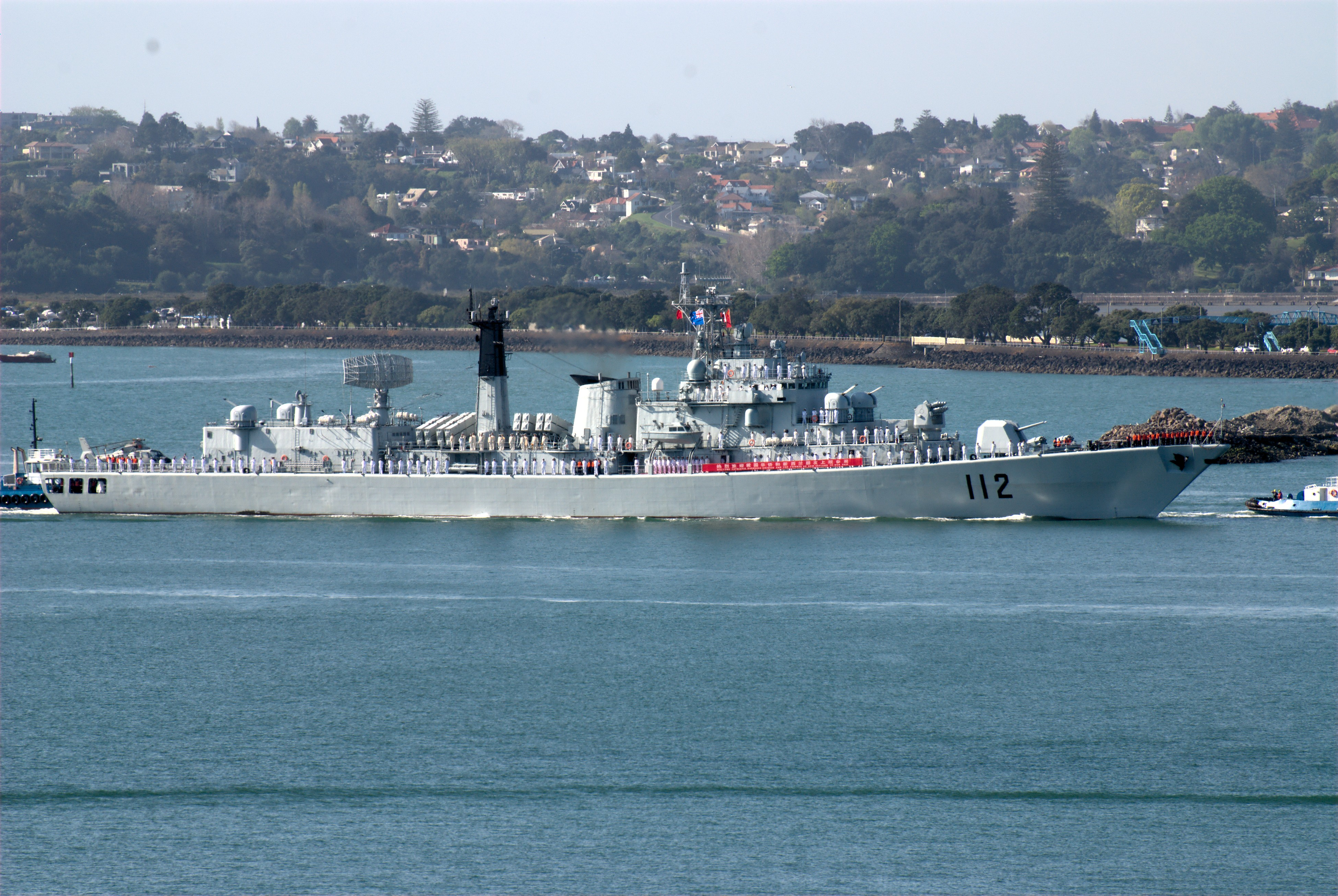
Harbin at Auckland, New Zealand, in 2007 with the low radar profile turret.

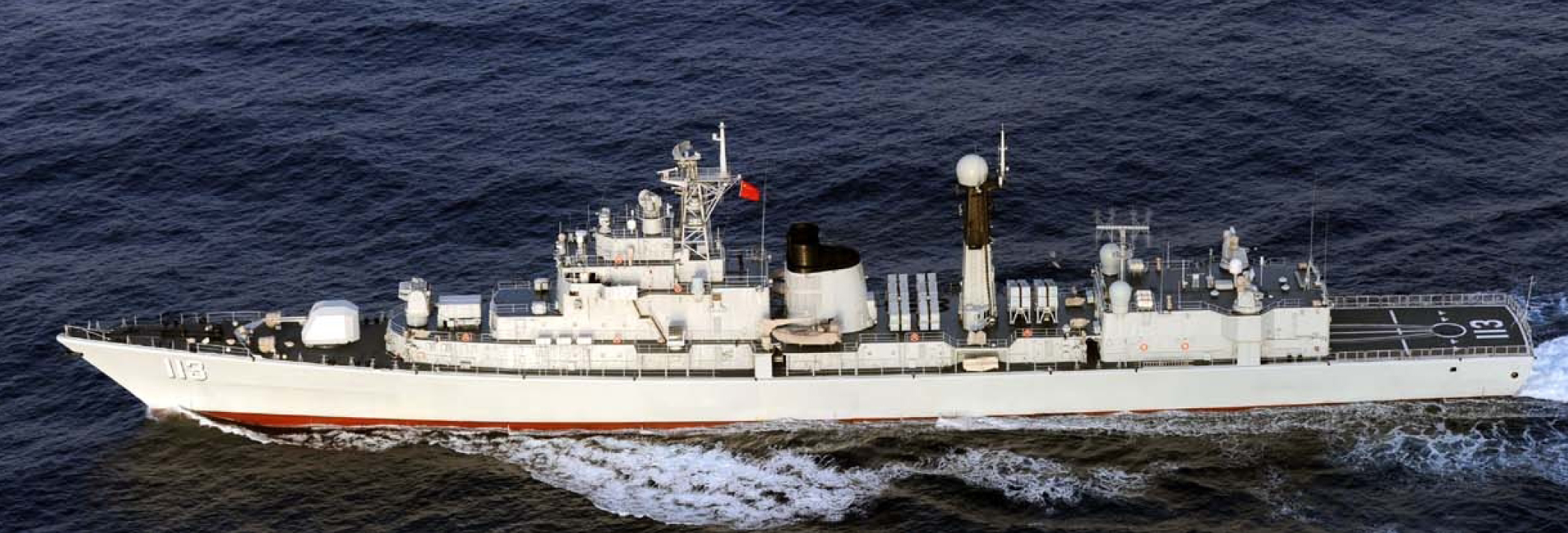
Qingdao in 2013 after the major refit.

== See also ==
- List of destroyer classes

Equivalent destroyers of the same era

- Durand de la Penne class

== Bibliography ==
- Collins, Gabriel; Grubb, Michael C. (August 2008). A Comprehensive Survey of China's Dynamic Shipbuilding Industry. China Maritime Studies. Vol. 1. United States Naval War College. ISBN 978-1-884733-54-3.
- Kirchberger, Sarah (2015). Assessing China's Naval Power: Technological Innovation, Economic Constraints, and Strategic Implications. Global Power Shift. Springer. ISBN 978-3-662-47127-2.
- McDevitt, Michael (2017). "The Modern PLA Navy Destroyer Force". CSMI Red Book. 14. United States Naval War College: 55–65. ISBN 978-1-935352-45-7.
