= List of ship commissionings in 1996 =

The list of ship commissionings in 1996 includes a chronological list of all ships commissioned in 1996.

	Operator	Ship	Flag	Class and type	Pennant	Other notes
16 February	United States Navy	Greeneville		Los Angeles-class submarine	SSN-772	
30 March	United States Navy	Benfold		Arleigh Burke-class destroyer	DDG-65	
13 April	United States Navy	Carney		Arleigh Burke-class destroyer	DDG-64	
28 May	People's Liberation Army Navy	Qingdao		Type 052 destroyer	113	Date of initial operational capability
8 June	United States Navy	Cole		Arleigh Burke-class destroyer	DDG-67	
8 June	United States Navy	Oak Hill		Whidbey Island-class dock landing ship	LSD-51	
13 September	United States Navy	Cheyenne		Los Angeles-class submarine	SSN-773	
20 September	Royal Navy	Somerset		Type 23 frigate	F82	
12 October	United States Navy	Gonzalez		Arleigh Burke-class destroyer	DDG-66	
2 November	Royal Navy	Vigilant		Vanguard-class submarine	S30	
23 November	United States Navy	Milius		Arleigh Burke-class destroyer	DDG-69	
25 November	Islamic Republic of Iran Navy	Yunes		Kilo-class submarine	903	

== Bibliography ==
- Saunders, Stephen, ed. (2004). Jane's Fighting Ships 2004–2005. Coulsdon, UK: Jane's Information Group. ISBN 0-7106-2623-1.
