= Chinese frigate Ma'anshan =

Type 054 frigate of the PLA Navy

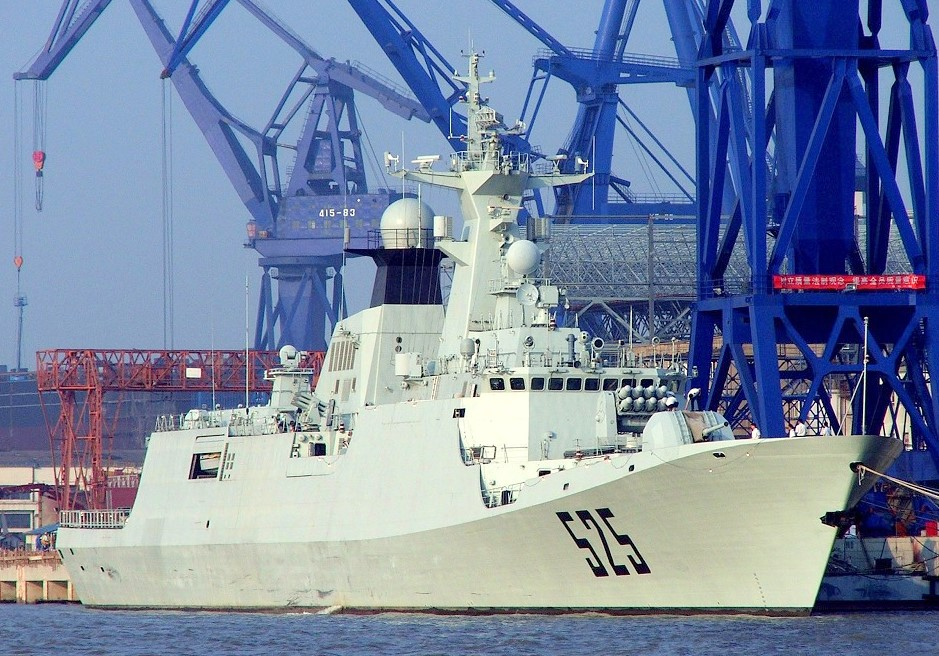
- Ma'anshan on 10 March 2010

History

China
- Name: Ma'anshan
- Namesake: Ma'anshan; (马鞍山)
- Builder: Hudong–Zhonghua Shipbuilding, Shanghai
- Laid down: December 1999
- Launched: 11 September 2003
- Commissioned: 18 February 2005
- Home port: Zhoushan
- Identification: Pennant number: 525
- Status: Active

General characteristics
- Class & type: Type 054 frigate
- Displacement: 3,900 tons
- Length: 134 m (440 ft)
- Beam: 16 m (52 ft)
- Draught: 5 m (16 ft)
- Propulsion: Combined diesel and diesel (CODAD), 4× SEMT Pielstick 16 PA6 STC diesels, 5700 kW (7600+ hp @ 1084 rpm) each
- Speed: 27 kn (50 km/h) estimated
- Range: 8,025 nautical miles (14,900 km) estimated
- Sensors & processing systems: Type 363S (Thomson-CSF DRBV-15 Sea Tiger) 2D air/surface search radar, E/F band; Type 345 (Thomson-CSF Castor-II) fire-control radar for HQ-7 SAM, I/J band; Type 347G Rice Lamp fire control radar for AK-630 CIWS guns, I-band; MR-36A surface search radar, I-band; Type MR34 100 mm gun fire control radar; 2× Racal RM-1290 navigation radars, I-band; MGK-335 medium frequency active/passive sonar system; ZKJ-4B/6 (developed from Thomson-CSF TAVITAC) combat data system; HN-900 Data link (Chinese equivalent of Link 11A/B, to be upgraded); SNTI-240 SATCOM
- Electronic warfare & decoys: Type 922-1 radar warning receiver; HZ-100 ECM & ELINT system
- Armament: 2× 4-cell YJ-83 (C-803) anti-ship missiles; 1× HQ-7 8-cell SAM launcher; 1× Type 210 100 mm naval gun; 4× AK-630 6-barrel 30 mm CIWS guns; Triple 324 mm YU-7 ASW torpedoes; Rocket launchers, possibly ASW rockets or decoy rockets
- Aircraft carried: 1 Kamov Ka-28 'Helix' or Harbin Z-9C
- Aviation facilities: hangar

Ma'anshan (525) is a Type 054 frigate of the People's Liberation Army Navy. She was commissioned on 18 February 2005.

== Development and design ==
The Type 054 has a stealthy hull design with sloped surfaces, radar absorbent materials, and a reduced superstructure clutter.

The main anti-ship armament were YJ-83 sea-skimming anti-ship cruise missiles in two four-cell launchers. It retained the HQ-7 SAM, an improved version of the French Crotale, from the preceding Type 053H3; the HQ-7 had a ready-to-fire 8-cell launcher, with 16 stored in the automatic reloader. Short range defence was improved with four AK-630 CIWS turrets. A 100 mm main gun, also based on a French design, was mounted.

== Construction and career ==
Ma'anshan was launched on 11 September 2003 at the Hudong-Zhonghua Shipyard in Shanghai. She was commissioned on 18 February 2005.

On November 28, 2012, Ma'anshan, Zhoushan, Hangzhou, Ningbo and Poyanghu integrated supply ship formed a naval open sea training fleet, passing through the Miyako Strait in batches and entering the waters of the Western Pacific to carry out routine training.

On September 25, 2013, Ma'anshan and Changzhou conducted an anti-submarine exercise organized by the East China Sea Fleet in the South China Sea. During the exercise, Ma'anshan and Changzhou ship-borne helicopters dropped several war mines and successfully destroyed the target.

In April 2014, Ma'anshan and other destroyers of the PLA Navy's East China Sea Fleet conducted formation anti-submarine and anti-missile training.

During mid 2019, Ma'anshan was docked for overhaul.

== Gallery ==
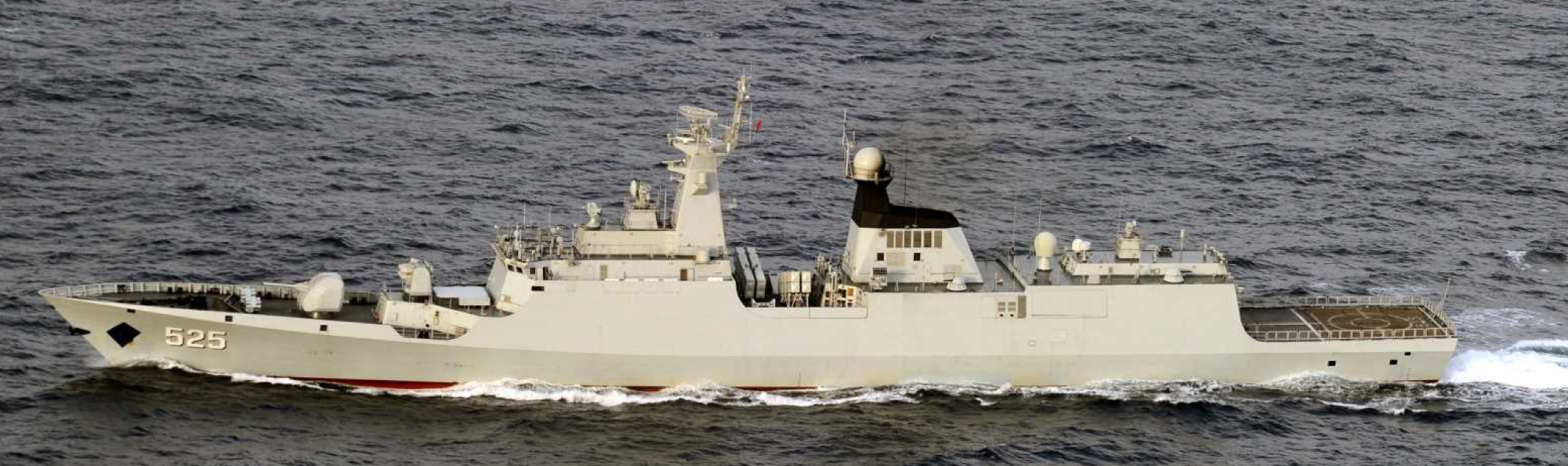
Ma'anshan underway on 13 December 2015.
