= Chinese destroyer Harbin =

Type 052 destroyer of the PLA Navy

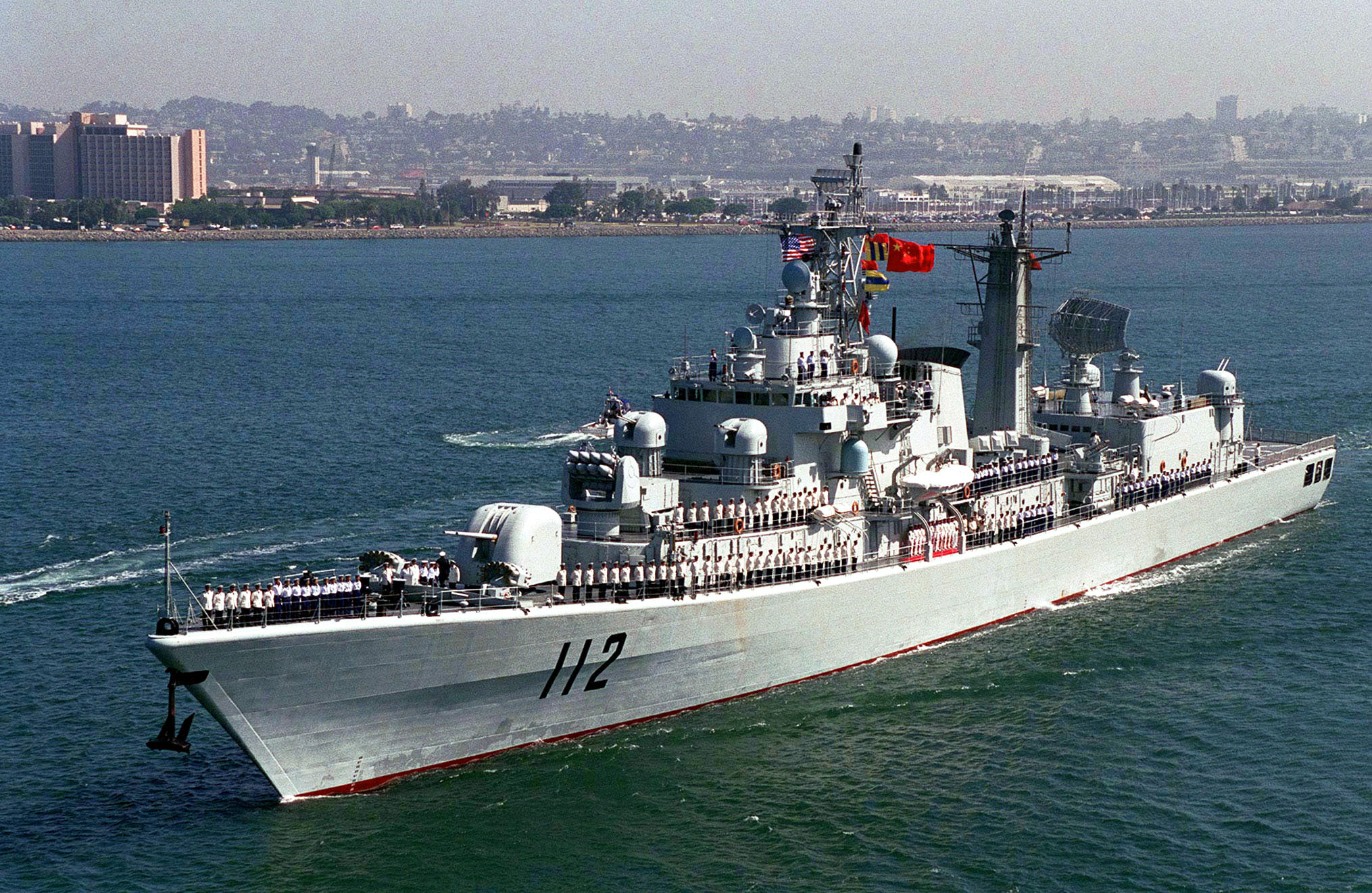
- DDG 112 Harbin

History

China
- Name: Harbin
- Namesake: Harbin; (哈尔滨)
- Builder: Jiangnan Shipyard, Jiangnan
- Laid down: May 1989
- Launched: 28 August 1991
- Commissioned: 8 May 1994
- Decommissioned: 28 Aug 2026
- Refit: 2011
- Identification: Pennant number: 112
- Status: Decommissioned, currently served as Museum ship in Changsha, Hunan for public visits and educational purposes

General characteristics
- Class & type: Luhu class
- Displacement: 4,800 tons
- Length: 144 m (472 ft 5 in)
- Beam: 16 m (52 ft 6 in)
- Draught: 5.1 m (16 ft 9 in)
- Propulsion: General Electric LM2500 gas turbines CODOG; 55,000 shp (41,000 kW)
- Speed: 31 kn (57 km/h; 36 mph)
- Range: 5,000 nmi (9,300 km; 5,800 mi)
- Complement: 260
- Electronic warfare & decoys: 2 × Type 726-4 122mm 24-tube decoy launchers installed on both sides of the forward bridge (After 2011 upgrade)
- Armament: 4 × 4 YJ-83 (C-803) anti-ship missiles; 1 × 8-cell HQ-7 SAM (8+16 rounds); 1 × Type H/PJ33A dual 100 mm/56 dual purpose gun; 2 × Triple Yu-7 torpedo tubes; After the latest system upgrade in mid-2011: 2 × H/PJ12 (Type 730) 7-barrel 30 mm CIWS replaced 4 × Type H/PJ76A dual 37 mm AA guns; 2 × Type 87 6-tube ASW rocket launchers replaced 2 × Type 75 12-tube ASW rocket launchers
- Aircraft carried: 2 helicopters: Harbin Z-9 or Kamov Ka-27
- Aviation facilities: Single helicopter landing platform; Two helicopter hangar; Helicopter landing system

Harbin (112) was a Type 052 destroyer of the People's Liberation Army Navy. She was commissioned in May 1994 and decommissioned in 28 Aug 2026.

== Development and design ==
Harbin is the lead ship of the Luhu class which was a significant improvement over the earlier Luda class and it is said to be the first indigenous Chinese warship design approaching modern standards. The name of her sister ship is Qingdao (113).

== Construction and career ==
Harbin was constructed by Jiangnan Shipyard and launched in 1991. She underwent a refit and upgrade in 2011.

In 1997 she visited the US stopping at Pearl Harbor before heading to California. The cost was part of a goodwill visit and constituted the first ever visit by a Chinese Navy ship to the United States mainland.

On 16 February 2013, Harbin, along with the Type 053H3 frigate Mianyang and the comprehensive supply ship Weishanhu formed the 14th Chinese naval escort flotilla which departed from the city of Qingdao to conduct anti-piracy and escort missions in the Gulf of Aden and Somali waters.

== Gallery ==
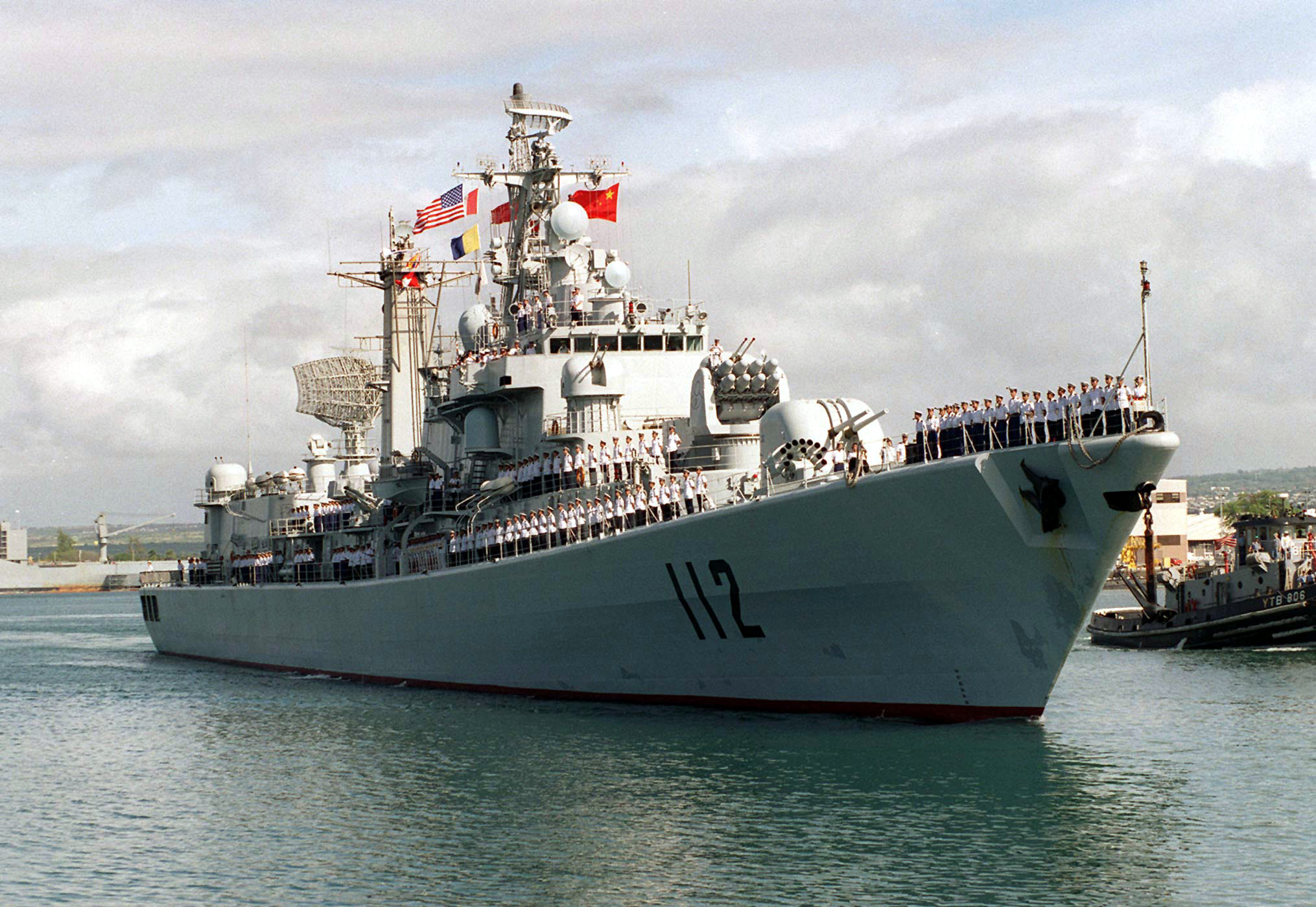
Harbin (DDG 112) before the 2011 upgrade

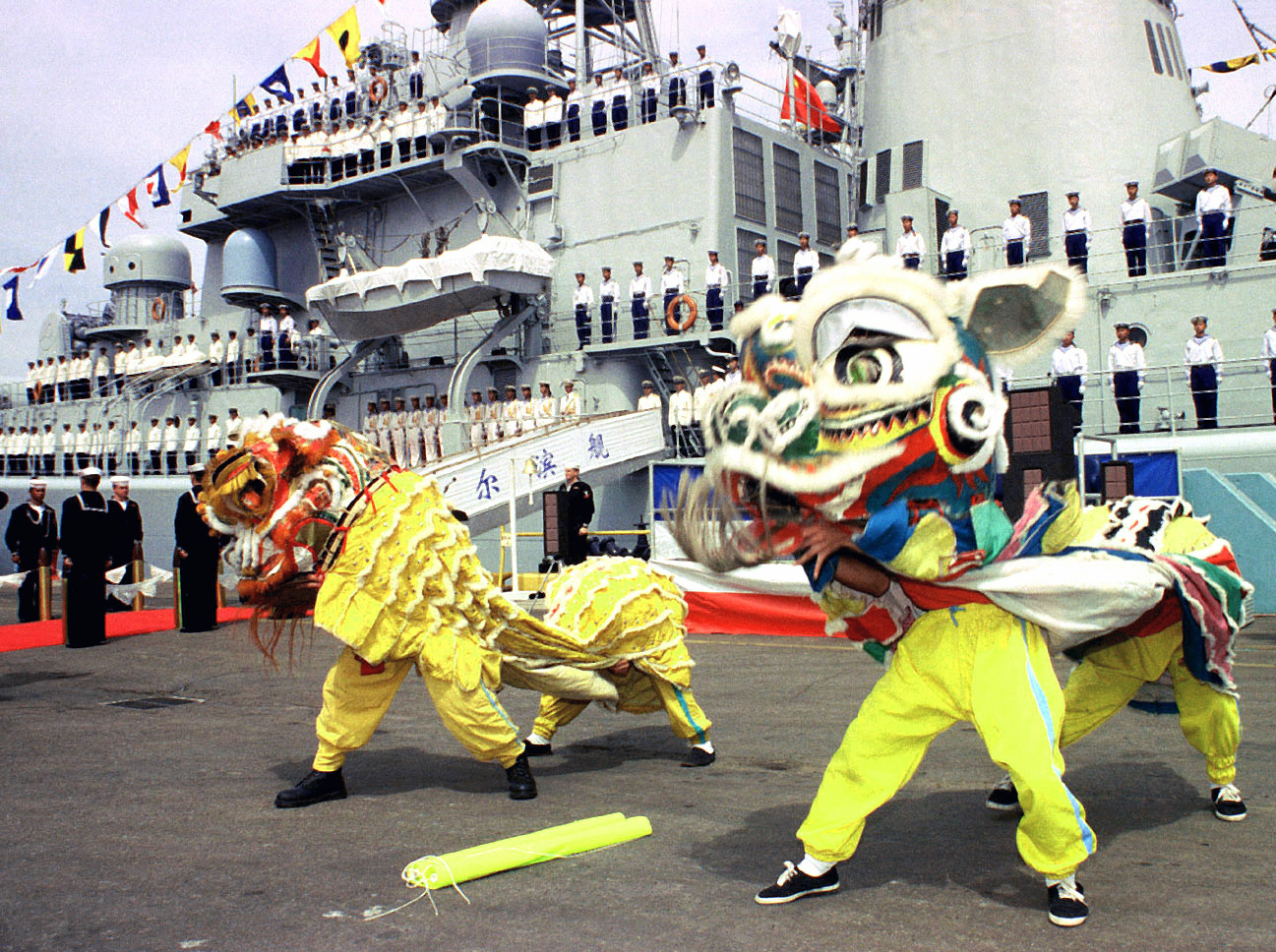
Harbin (112) in California on 21 March 1997
