= Type 053H3 frigate =

Class of Chinese warship

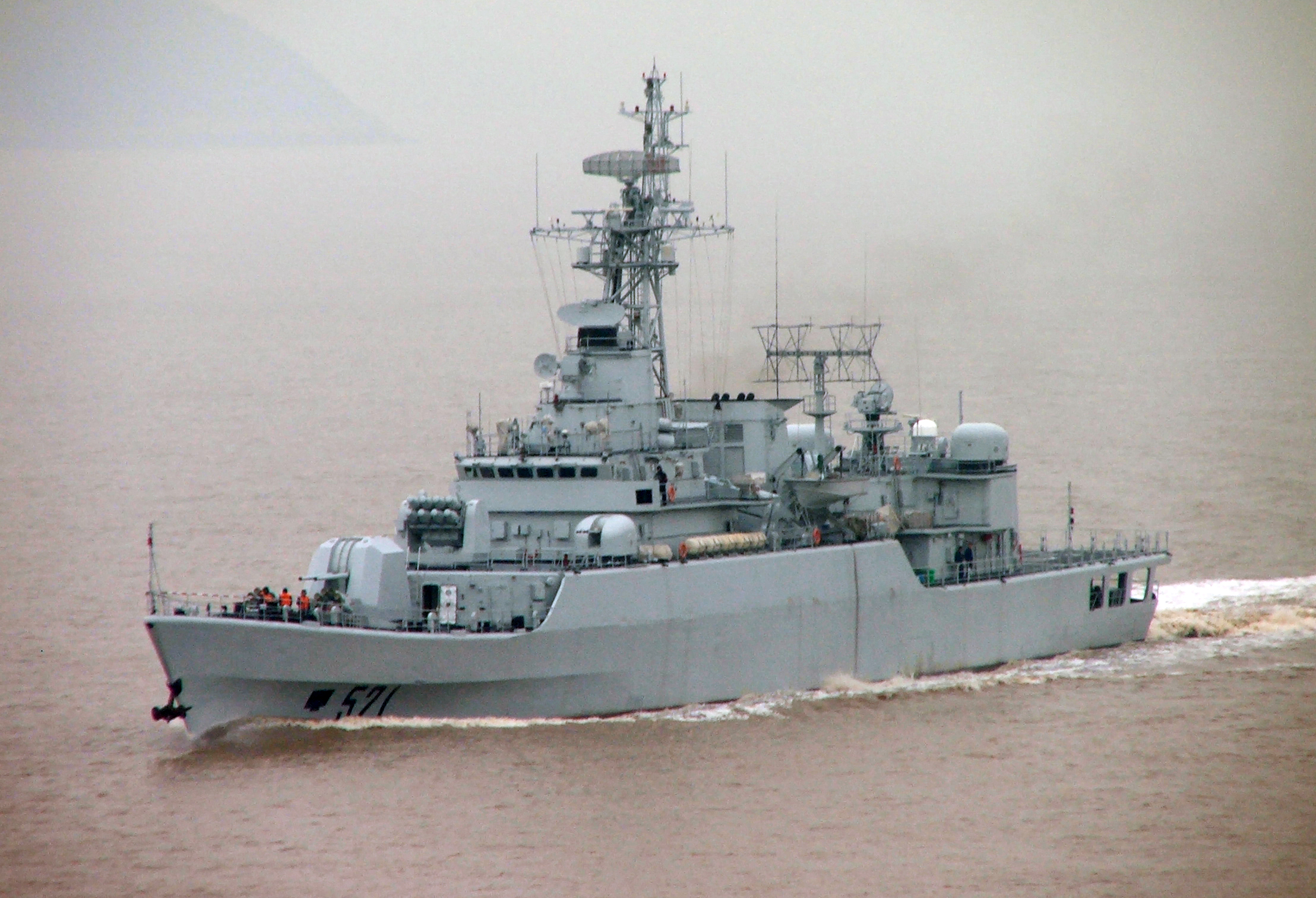
- Jiaxing (521) underway in 2005

Class overview
- Name: Type 053H3
- Operators: People's Liberation Army Navy Surface Force; Bangladesh Navy
- Preceded by: Type 053H2G
- Succeeded by: Type 054
- Subclasses: Zulfiquar class (Pakistan Navy)
- Planned: 10
- Completed: 10
- Active: 8 (PLAN Surface Force); 2 (Bangladesh Navy)

General characteristics
- Type: Frigate
- Displacement: 2,250 tons standard, 2,393 tons full load
- Length: 112 m (367 ft 5 in)
- Beam: 12.4 m (40 ft 8 in)
- Draught: 4.3 m (14 ft 1 in)
- Propulsion: CODAD, 2 shaft, 2 x 18E390VA diesel at 23,600 hp (17,600 kW); 2 x MTU diesel at 8,715 hp (6,499 kW)
- Speed: 28 knots (52 km/h; 32 mph)
- Range: 5,000 nautical miles (9,300 km; 5,800 mi) at 15 to 16 knots (28 to 30 km/h)
- Endurance: 21
- Complement: 168 (with 30 officers)
- Sensors & processing systems: Type 360 Radar (SR60) surface search, E/F band; Type 517H-1 (Knife Rest) 2D long-range air search, A-band; Type 345 Radar (MR35) HQ-7 surface-to-air missile fire-control, J-band; Type 352 Radar (Square Tie) surface search and SSM fire control, I-band; Type 343GA (Wasp Head) fire control radar for main gun, G/H-band; 2 × Type 347G/EFR-1 (Rice Lamp) dual 37 mm AA gun fire control, I-band; 2 × Racal RM-1290 navigation radar, I-band
- Electronic warfare & decoys: Data link: HN-900 (Chinese equivalent of Link 11A/B, to be upgraded); Communication: SNTI-240 SATCOM; Combat Data System: ZKJ-3C; RWD-8 (Jug Pair) intercept; Type 981-3 EW Jammer; SR-210 Radar warning receiver; Type 651A IFF; 2 × Type 946/PJ-46 15-barrel decoy rocket launchers
- Armament: 8 × YJ-83 SSM in 2 x 4-cell box launchers; 1 × 8-cell HQ-7 surface-to-air missile system (replaced with 1 x 8-cell HQ-10 on PLA ships); 1 × H/PJ-33B dual 100 mm gun (automatic); 4 × Type 76A dual 37 mm AA guns (replaced with 2 x Type 630 30mm guns on PLA ships); 2 × 6-tube Type 3200 ASW rocket launchers (36 rockets); 2 × DC racks & launcher
- Aircraft carried: Harbin Z-9C
- Aviation facilities: Hangar

The Type 053H3 (NATO reporting name: Jiangwei II) is a class of Chinese frigates that entered service with the People's Liberation Army Navy Surface Force in the 1990s and 2000s. The class comprised ten vessels, all of which remain in active service including two which have been sold to the Bangladesh Navy. They were a follow-on of the Type 053H2G frigate class. The Zulfiquar-class frigate used by the Pakistan Navy was based on the Type 053H3.

== History ==
In the 1980s, the PLAN ordered Shanghai-based Hudong Shipyard (now Hudong–Zhonghua Shipyard) to build a replacement for the Type 053K air defence frigate. The new class was based on the Type 053H2 frigate and designated Type 053H2G. Development was carried out under Project 055.

The Type 053H2G was slightly larger than the Type 053H2, and equipped with HQ-61B surface-to-air missiles (SAM). The HQ-61 proved unsatisfactory and the class was quickly superseded by the Type 053H3, which was an improved Type 053H2G equipped with HQ-7 SAMs. The HQ-7 was a Chinese-produced version of the French R330 Sea Crotale. Ten Type 053H3s were produced between 1996 and 2005.

The most obvious visual distinction between Type 053H2 & H3 are: The Type 053H3's have HQ-7 instead of HQ-61B SAMs, 8 C-802 anti-ship missiles instead of 6, and aft AAA mounts elevated compared to the 053H2. The Type 053H3 class was briefly equipped with HQ-61B SAM system before being replaced by HQ-7 during upgrade. Some sources claim that the upgraded version is also called Type 057.

== Transfers to Bangladesh ==
The earliest two units, Jiaxing and Lianyungang, were selected in 2020 for sale to Bangladesh. However, Putian was subsequently substituted for Jiaxing. Both ships were recommissioned in the Bangladesh Navy in November 2020 and renamed as shown below.

== Mid-life upgrade ==
A limited, mid-life upgrade was observed for the 053H3 starting in 2015. Visible difference include the replacement of the ESM/EW suite/radars to similar systems from the Type 054, replacement of the HQ-7 with the HHQ-10 short range air defense missile and replacement of the 4 × Type 76A 37 mm guns with a new 2 × Type 630 30 mm CIWS similar to the Gryazev-Shipunov AO-18K.

== Ships of class ==
| Number | Pennant Number | Name | Namesake | Builder | Launched | Commissioned | Fleet | Status |
|---|---|---|---|---|---|---|---|---|
| 1 | 521 | 嘉兴 / Jiaxing | City of Jiaxing | Hudong, Shanghai | 10 August 1997 | August 1998 | East Sea Fleet | Active |
| 2 | 522 | 连云港 / Lianyungang | City of Lianyungang | Hudong, Shanghai | 8 August 1997 | January 1999 | East Sea Fleet | Sold to the Bangladesh Navy as BNS Umar Farooq (F-16). |
| 3 | 523 | 莆田 / Putian | City of Putian | Hudong, Shanghai | 10 August 1998 | December 1999 | East Sea Fleet | Sold to the Bangladesh Navy as BNS Abu Ubaidah (F-19) |
| 4 | 524 | 三明 / Sanming | City of Sanming | Hudong, Shanghai | December 1998 | 25 December 1999 | East Sea Fleet | Active. |
| 5 | 564 | 宜昌 / Yichang | City of Yichang | Huangpu, Guangzhou | October 1998 | December 1999 | North Sea Fleet | Active / Relegated to training role |
| 6 | 565 | 葫芦岛/ Huludao | City of Huludao | Huangpu, Guangzhou | April 1999 | July 2000 | North Sea Fleet | Active / Relegated to training role |
| 7 | 566 | 怀化 / Huaihua | City of Huaihua | Hudong, Shanghai | January 2001 | 2 June 2002 | East Sea Fleet | Active. |
| 8 | 567 | 襄阳 / Xiangyang | City of Xiangyang | Huangpu, Guangzhou | August 2001 | September 2002 | East Sea Fleet | Active. Ex-Xiangfan, renamed in June 2011. |
| 9 | 528 | 绵阳 / Mianyang | City of Mianyang | Huangpu, Guangzhou | 30 May 2004 | October 2004 | North Sea Fleet | Active. |
| 10 | 527 | 洛阳 / Luoyang | City of Luoyang | Hudong, Shanghai | 1 August 2004 | January 2005 | North Sea Fleet | Active. |

== See also ==
- List of frigate classes in service

Equivalent frigates of the same era

- Brahmaputra class
- Hydra class
- La Fayette class
- Barbaros class
- Lekiu class
