= Chinese destroyer Qingdao =

Type 052 destroyer of the PLA Navy

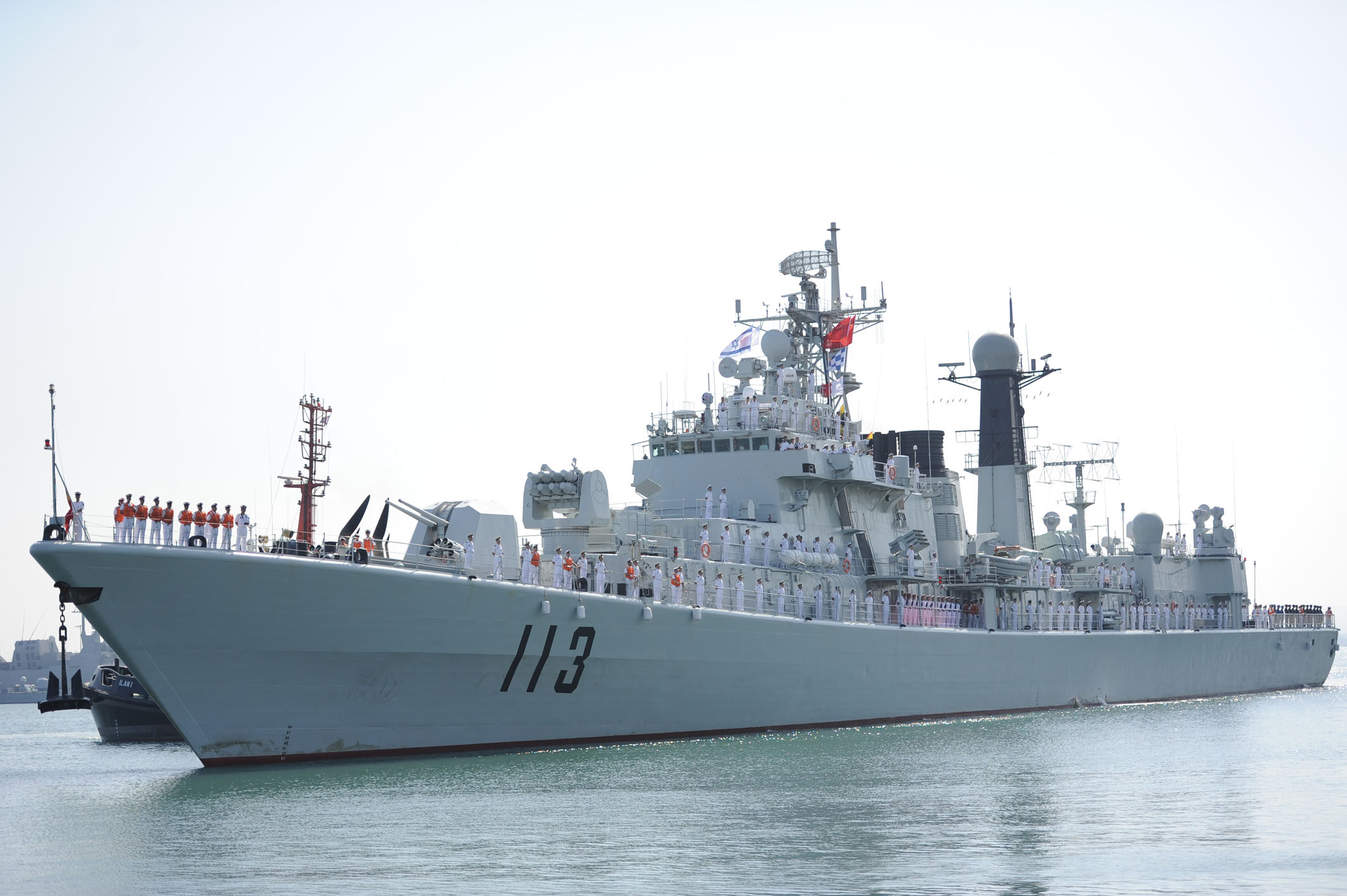
- Qingdao (DDG 113) after the 2011 upgrade

History

China
- Name: Qingdao
- Namesake: Qingdao; (青岛)
- Builder: Jiangnan Shipyard, Jiangnan
- Launched: 18 October 1993
- Commissioned: 28 May 1996
- Refit: 2011
- Identification: Pennant number: 113
- Status: Active

General characteristics
- Class & type: Luhu class
- Displacement: 4,800 tons
- Length: 144 m (472 ft 5 in)
- Beam: 16 m (52 ft 6 in)
- Draught: 5.1 m (16 ft 9 in)
- Propulsion: General Electric LM2500 gas turbines CODOG; 55,000 shp (41,000 kW)
- Speed: 31 kn (57 km/h; 36 mph)
- Range: 5,000 nmi (9,300 km; 5,800 mi)
- Complement: 230
- Electronic warfare & decoys: 2 × Type 726-4 122mm 24-tube decoy launchers installed on both sides of the forward bridge (After 2011 upgrade)
- Armament: 4 × 4 YJ-83 (C-803) anti-ship missiles; 1 × 8-cell HQ-7 SAM (8+16 rounds); 1 × Type H/PJ33A dual 100 mm/56 dual purpose gun; 2 × Triple Yu-7 torpedo tubes; After the latest system upgrade in mid-2011: 2 × H/PJ12 (Type 730) 7-barrel 30 mm CIWS replaced 4 × Type H/PJ76A dual 37 mm AA guns; 2 × Type 87 6-tube ASW rocket launchers replaced 2 × Type 75 12-tube ASW rocket launchers
- Aircraft carried: 2 helicopters: Harbin Z-9 or Kamov Ka-27
- Aviation facilities: Single helicopter landing platform; Two helicopter hangar; Helicopter landing system

Qingdao (113) is a Type 052 destroyer of the People's Liberation Army Navy. She was commissioned in May 1996. She is currently the only active destroyer of her class.

== Development and design ==
Qingdao is the second and last ship of the Luhu class following her sister ship, Harbin (112).

== Construction and career ==
Qingdao was constructed by Jiangnan Shipyard and launched in 1993. She underwent a refit and upgrade in 2011.

On 27 February 2012, Qingdao, along with the Type 054A frigate Yantai and the comprehensive supply ship Weishanhu, formed the 11th Chinese naval escort flotilla which departed from the city of Qingdao to conduct anti-piracy and escort missions in the Gulf of Aden and Somali waters.

On 9 June 2013, Qingdao made a goodwill visit to Pearl Harbor, Hawaii.

In October 2013, Qingdao participated in the International Fleet Review 2013 in Sydney, Australia.

== Gallery ==
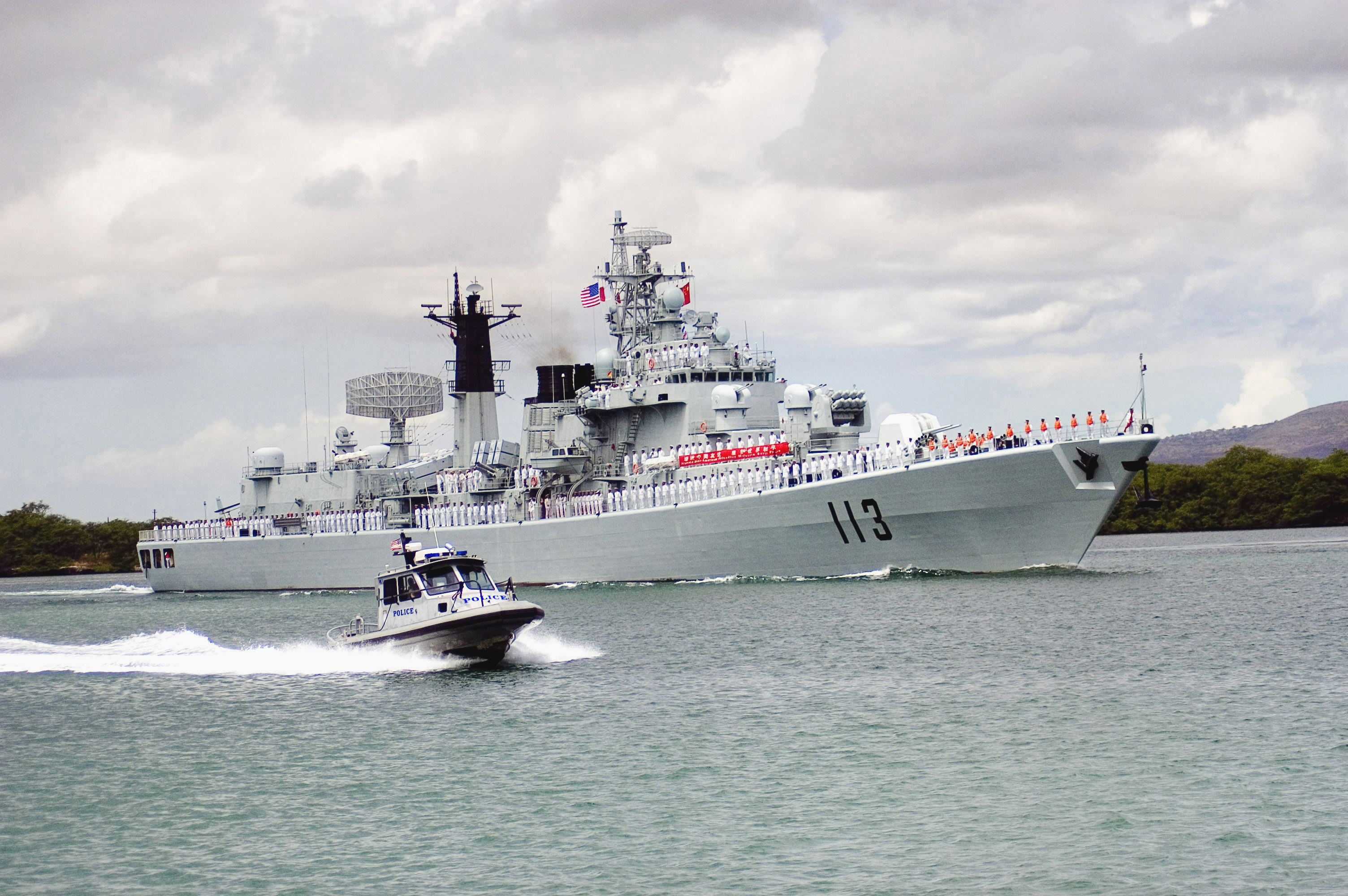
Luhu Destroyer Qingdao on a visit to Pearl Harbor
