= Hudong, Lufeng, Guangdong =

Coordinates: 22.81713°N 115.95059°E

Hudong 湖东
- Subdistrict

Chinese transcription(s)
- Interactive map of Hudong
- Country: China
- Province: Guangdong
- Prefecture: Shanwei
- County-level city: Lufeng
- Time zone: UTC+8 (China Standard Time)

Hudong (Chinese: 湖东; pinyin: Húdōng) is a township-level division situated in Lufeng, Shanwei, Guangdong, China.

== See also ==
- List of township-level divisions of Guangdong
