= China Marine Surveillance East China Sea Fleet =

China Marine Surveillance East China Sea Fleet (Chinese: 中国海监东海总队) was a fleet of the China Marine Surveillance under the State Oceanic Administration. It was disbanded and merged into the China Coast Guard on July 2013 along with the China Marine Surveillance.

== Organization ==
- 4th Marine Surveillance Flotilla (Chinese: 中国海监第四支队). Homeport: Ningbo, Zhejiang.
- 5th Marine Surveillance Flotilla (Chinese: 中国海监第五支队). Homeport: Pudong, Shanghai.
- 6th Marine Surveillance Flotilla (Chinese: 中国海监第六支队. Homeport: Xiamen, Fujian.
- East China Sea Aviation Detachment (Chinese: 中国海监东海航空支队). Based in Zhoushan, operator of Y-12.
