= Type 517 radar =

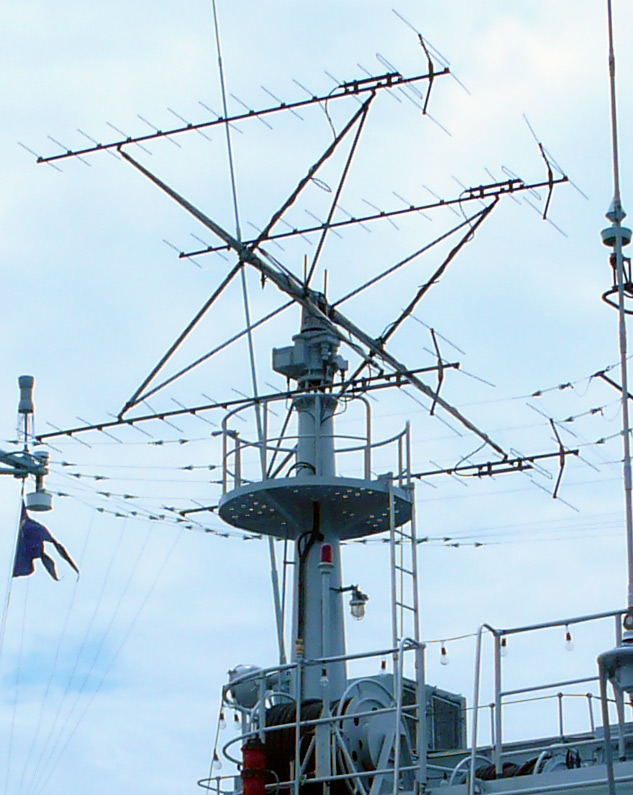
Side view of Type 517 radar deployed on Type 053H3 Frigate taken during IMDEX 2007

Type 517 radar is believed to be an A-band/VHF air search radar widely deployed on People's Liberation Army Navy surface vessels with 4 antennas in two crossed-brace supported pairs, one above the other, mounted in pairs on each side of a single tubular support carried on the turning gear.

Similar to the Russian P-8 'Dolphin'/KNIFE REST radar which China manufactures and deploys for the HQ-2 surface to air system complex, it is believed that Type 517 has similar capabilities and specifications. The system is manufactured by the Beijing Leiyin Electronic Technology Development Company (Chinese: 北京雷音电子技术开发有限公司).

== Specifications ==
=== Technical Specifications ===
- System Band: meter-band
- Beam width: 5° (H), 30° (V)
- Scan coverage: 360°×30°
- Range: 350 km against 4 m^{2} RCS target; 100 km against 0.1 m^{2} RCS Stealth aircraft
- Accuracy: range error ≤200m, angle error ≤1°
- Processing capacity
  - Multiple tracking: ≥ 20 pcs
- Antenna
  - Antenna : Yagi-Uda array
  - Rotation speed: 6 RPM
- Transmitter / Receiver
  - Frequency: 180–210 MHz (meter-band)
  - NF: <6 dB
- Power Supply
  - AC: 220VAC (150~250 VAC)
  - Power consumption: 25 kW
- Features
  - Non-coherent pulse compression (NCPC) system
  - Moving target automatically detection
  - Long range air surveillance
- Other reported names:
  - Spider (export)
  - SUR17B
