= Type 360 radar =

Chinese naval search radar

Type 360
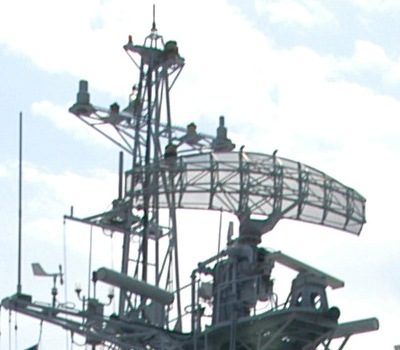
- Type 360 on a Type 053H3 frigate
- Country of origin: China
- Manufacturer: Yangzhou Marine Electronic Instrument Research Institute,
- Introduced: Early 2000s
- Type: 2-D surface and low-altitude search
- Frequency: E band (NATO)/F band (NATO)
- Range: 250 kilometres (160 mi)
- Other names: H/LJP-360 "Seagull"

The Type 360 is a Chinese naval surveillance radar. It may be used with the HHQ-7 surface-to-air missile system.

It is sometimes erroneously called "Type 362".

== Variants ==
Type 360
Type 360S
Variant possibly operating in the S band.
SR60
Export variant.

== See also ==
- List of radars § China

== Sources ==
- Hundman, Eric (March 2025). China's Air Defense Radar Industrial Base. China Aerospace Studies Institute (Report).
