= HQ-7 =

Chinese short-range surface-to-air missile

HQ-7 / FM-80 / FM-90
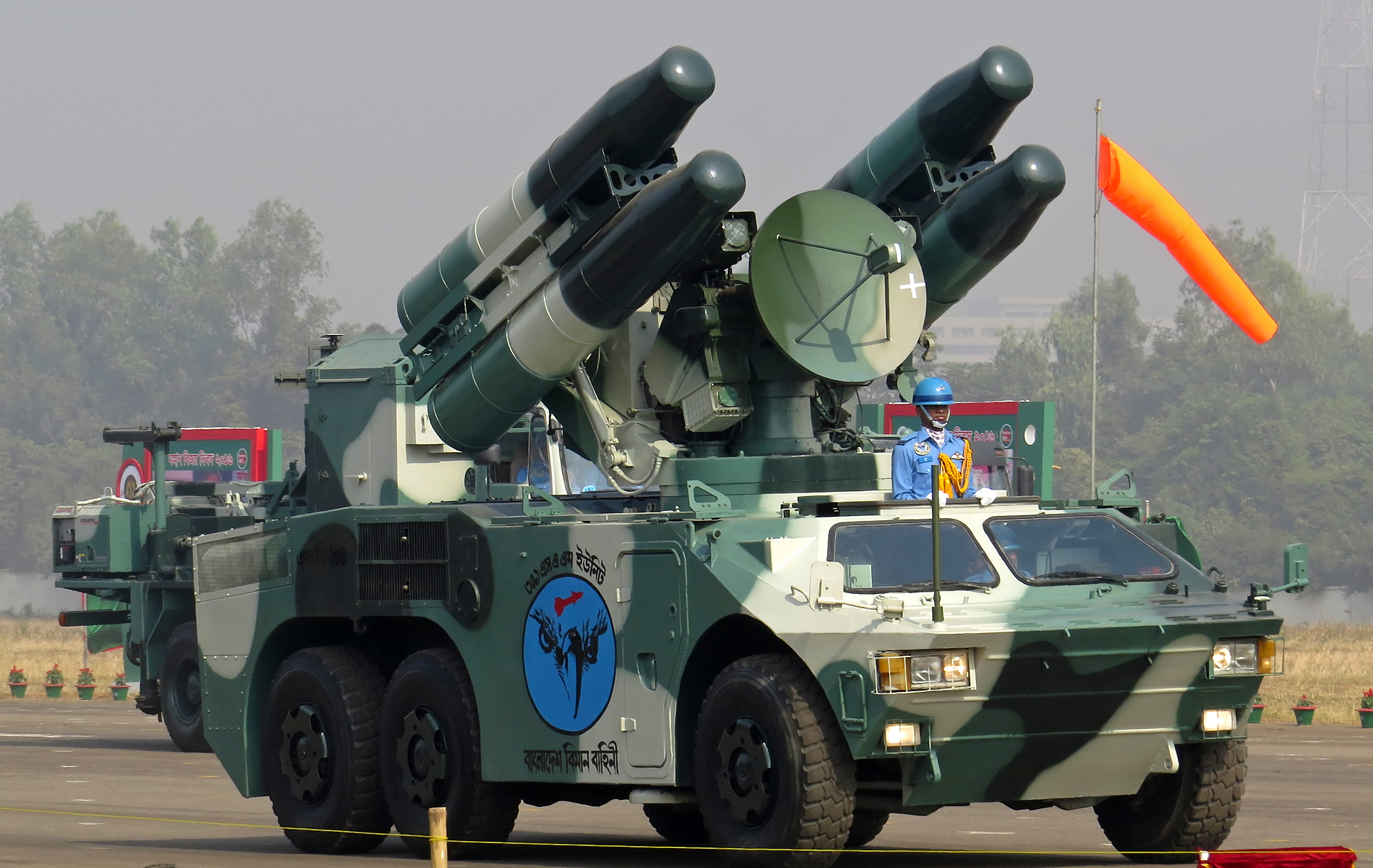
- FM-90 of the Bangladesh Air Force
- Type: Surface-to-air missile
- Place of origin: People's Republic of China

Production history
- Designer: Changfeng Electromechanical Technology Design Institute

Specifications
- Mass: 84.5 kg (186 lb)
- Length: 3 m (9.8 ft)
- Diameter: 0.156 m (6.1 in)
- Engine: Solid fuel rocket
- Operational range: 8 kilometres (5.0 mi) (slant, fast target); 15 kilometres (9.3 mi) (slant, slow target)
- Guidance system: Command-guided version.; Infrared homing
- Launch platform: Transporter erector launcher; Ship

The HQ-7 (simplified Chinese: 红旗-7; traditional Chinese: 紅旗-7; pinyin: Hóng Qí-7; lit. 'Red Banner-7'; NATO reporting name: CH-SA-4) is a short-range surface-to-air missile (SAM) from the People's Republic of China. It was reverse-engineered by the Changfeng Electromechanical Technology Design Institute from the French R-440 Crotale SAM. It entered service in the early 1980s.

A ground battery consists of a short-range radar and three launchers. Each launcher has four or eight missiles.

== Variants ==
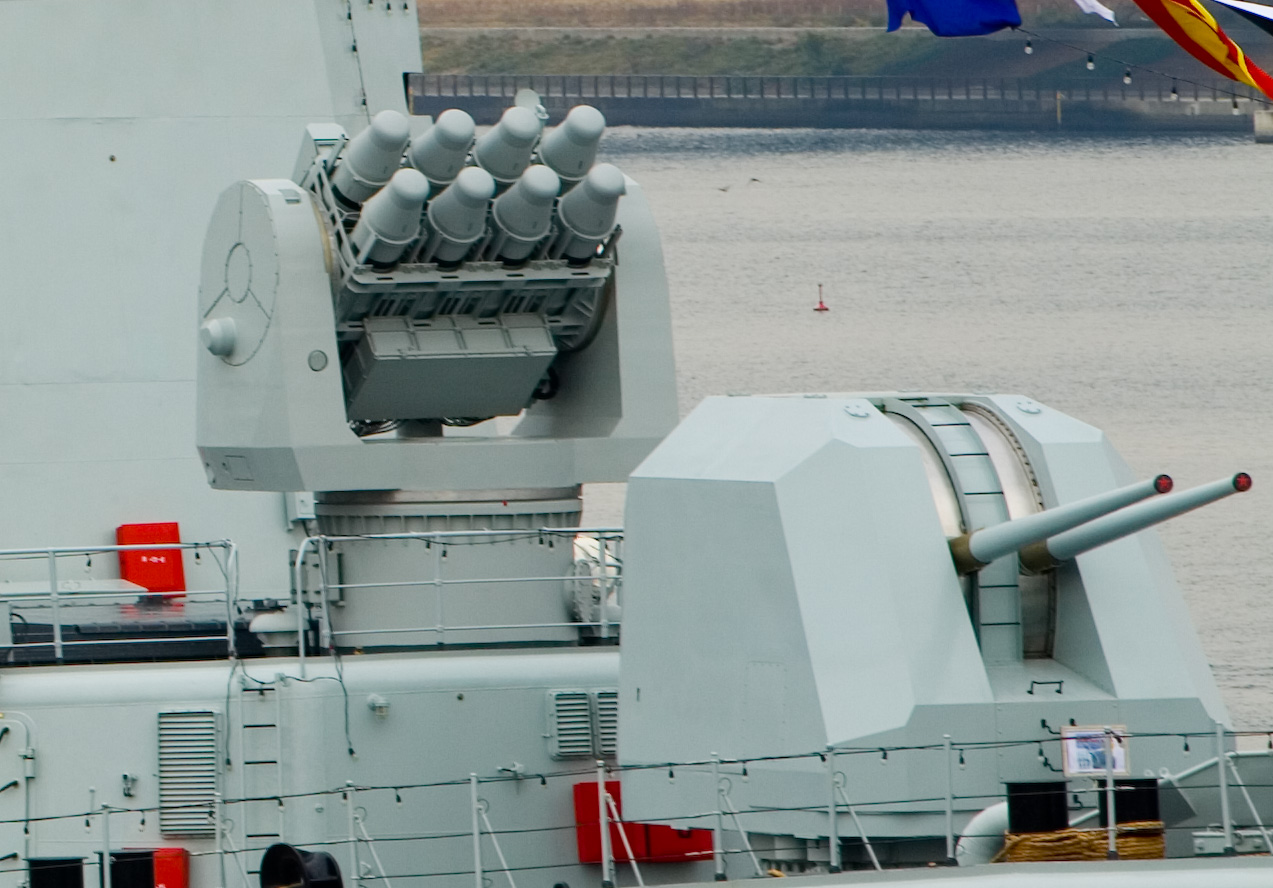
Eight-missile HHQ-7 launcher on Shenzhen.

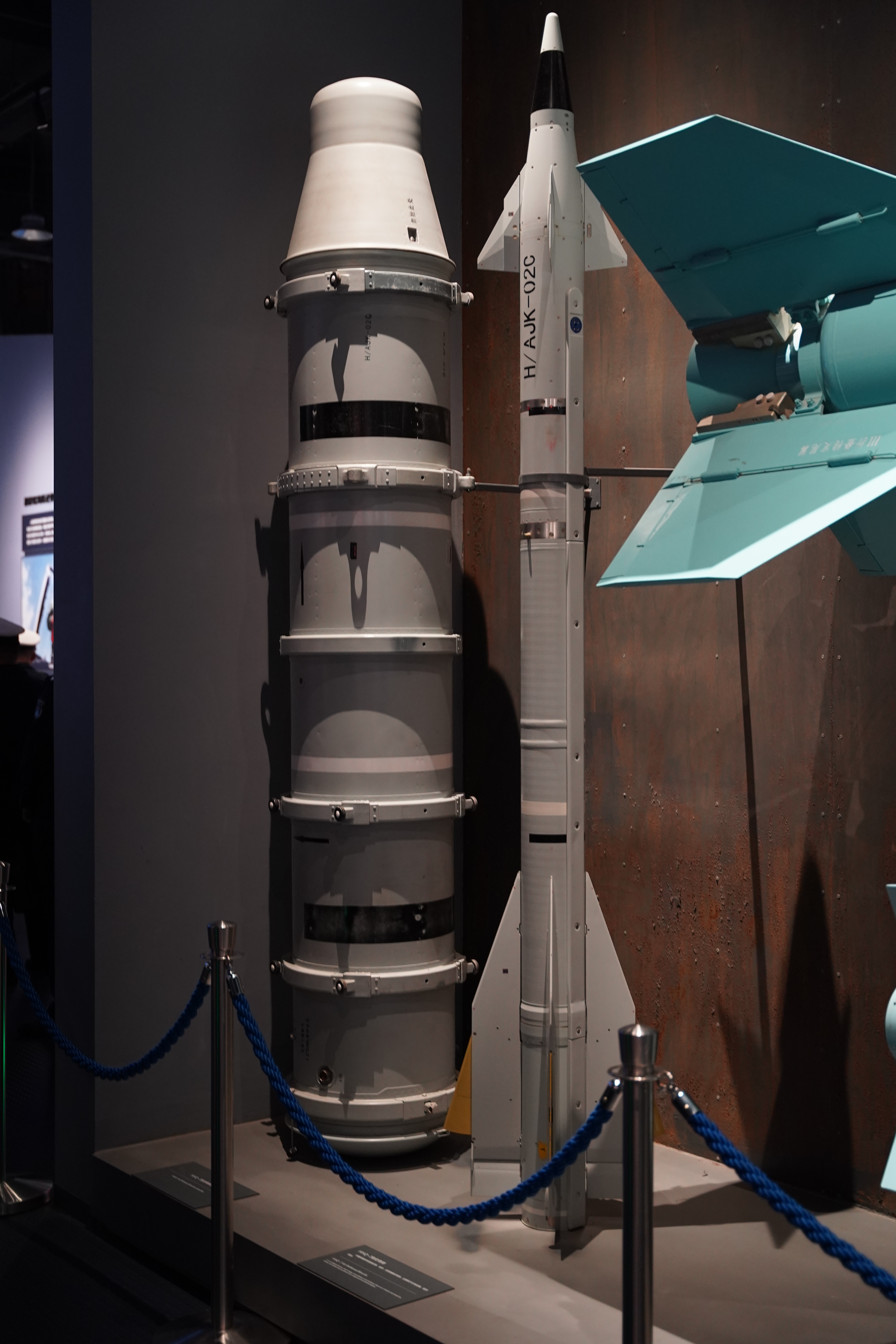
HHQ-7 launcher (left) and HHQ-7 missile (right) on display at the PLA Naval Museum in Qingdao.

HQ-7A

Original command-guided version.

HHQ-7

Naval variant.

HQ-7B

Improved version.

FM-80

Export version of the HQ-7A.

FM-90

Export version of the HQ-7B.

FM-90N

Naval variant of the FM-90.

== Operators ==
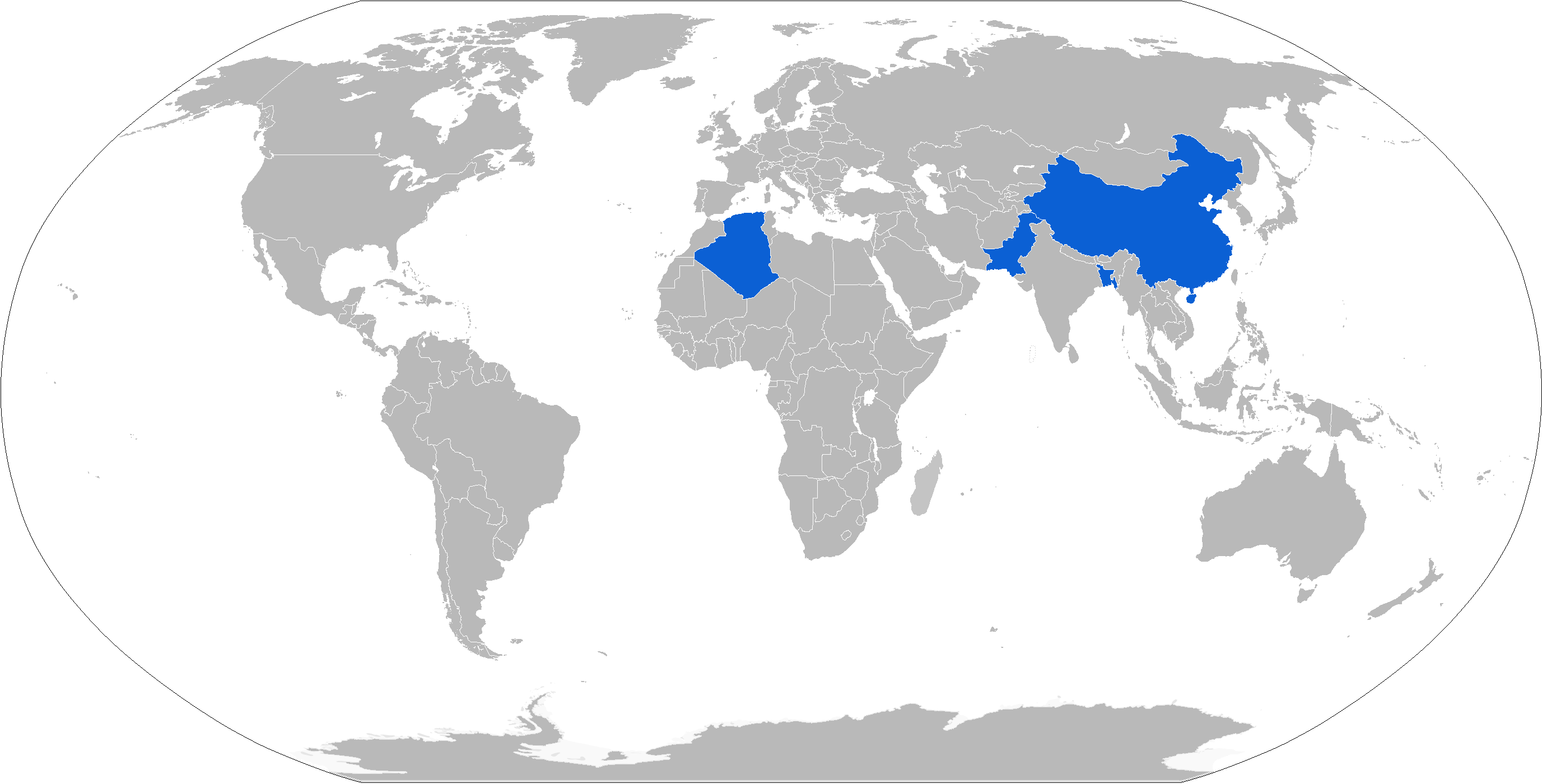
Map with HQ-7 operators in blue

Algeria

FM-90.

Bangladesh

- Bangladesh Army: FM-90
- Bangladesh Air Force: FM-90
- Bangladesh Navy: FM-90N and HHQ-7.

People's Republic of China

HQ-7A, HQ-7B and HHQ-7.

Iran

FM-80. Produces a mobile version dubbed Herz-9

Pakistan

FM-90 and FM-90N.

Turkmenistan

FM-90.

== See also ==
- Ya Zahra (unlicensed Iranian copy of the system)
  - Herz-9 (mobile version of the Ya Zahra system)

== Sources ==
- Einhorn, Robert; Sidhu, W.P.S. (March 2017). The Strategic Chain: Linking Pakistan, India, China, and the United States (PDF) (Report). Arms Control and Non-Proliferation Series. Brookings Institution.
- Medeiros, Evan S.; Cliff, Roger; Crane, Keith; Mulvenon, James C. (2005). A New Direction for China's Defense Industry (PDF). RAND Corporation. ISBN 0-8330-3794-3.
- The International Institute for Strategic Studies (2022). The Military Balance 2022. Routledge. ISBN 978-1-032-27900-8.
- International Institute for Strategic Studies (2023). Hackett, James (ed.). The Military Balance 2023 (Report). Routledge. ISBN 9781032508955. ISSN 0459-7222.
- Chinese Tactics (PDF). Army Techniques Publication. Washington, D.C.: United States Department of the Army. 9 August 2021. 7-100.3.
