= Rolls-Royce Power Systems =

German company

Rolls-Royce Power Systems AG
- Formerly: Tognum AG (2006–2014)
- Type: Private
- Industry: Mechanical engineering
- Founded: 1909; 117 years ago (as Luftfahrzeug-Motorenbau GmbH; 1912; 114 years ago as Maybach-Motorenbau GmbH; 2006; 20 years ago (as Tognum AG)
- Headquarters: Friedrichshafen, Germany
- Key people: Tufan Erginbilgic (chief executive and chairman of the management board); Axel Arendt (chairman of the supervisory board)
- Products: Engines for oil and gas installations, mining, marine propulsion, locomotives and military vehicles; injection systems; power generators
- Revenue: €2.564 billion (2010)
- Operating income: €112.3 million (2010)
- Net income: €62.8 million (2010)
- Total assets: €2.746 billion (end 2010)
- Total equity: €735.8 million (end 2010)
- Number of employees: 10,700 (end 2013)
- Parent: Rolls-Royce Holdings
- Website: www.rrpowersystems.com

Rolls-Royce Power Systems AG (formerly Tognum AG) is a German company owned by Rolls-Royce Holdings with holdings in engine manufacturing brands and facilities. The company previously traded, from 2006 to 2014, as Tognum AG. Prior to 2006, the core company – MTU Friedrichshafen GmbH – was a constituent of DaimlerChrysler Powersystems Off-Highway.

== History ==
Tognum AG was formed when private equity fund EQT IV acquired in late 2005 several Off-Highway divisions of DaimlerChrysler. All units are to assume the corporate brand, but will otherwise operate independently.

The company went public on 2 July 2007, listed in the Prime Standard segment of the Frankfurt Stock Exchange. EQT retained a minority share of 22.3% until April 2008, when it was sold to Daimler AG.

Rolls-Royce Holdings and Daimler AG launched a takeover for Tognum in March 2011. The two companies announced on 24 June 2011 that their joint €3.4 billion tender offer had been successful, with 94% of Tognum shareholders accepting. Once the acquisition was complete, Tognum was run as a 50-50 joint venture, with Rolls-Royce merging its Bergen Marine diesel engines unit into the operation.

The acquisition of Tognum by the two companies was completed in September 2011 and the business continued to trade as Tognum AG until January 2014, when it was renamed Rolls-Royce Power Systems AG. Rolls-Royce Holdings confirmed in March 2014 that they would purchase Daimler AG's 50% stake in the joint venture. Daimler AG will continue to supply engines to Rolls-Royce as part of existing long term supply agreements which run to 2025, this results from smaller MTU engines being derived from Daimler AG's range of diesel engines used in their on-highway commercial vehicles.. Rolls-Royce later completed the sale of this smaller engine division to Deutz AG in August 2024.

Rolls-Royce funded the acquisition from Daimler AG through a mixture of cash and some borrowing, paying Daimler AG around £1.9 billion (€2.3 billion) for their stake in the business. Analysts expect the deal to add between 5 and 6% to Rolls-Royce earnings. Daimler AG will use the proceeds to fund investments in their core automotive business.

== Operating brands ==
- MTU Friedrichshafen
- MTU Onsite Energy
- MTU America
- Mercedes-Benz industrial engines
- L'Orange GmbH
- Bergen Engines AS

There is also a joint venture with Transmashholding, called MTU Transmashholding Diesel Technologies; it will produce MTU 4000-series engines at a factory near Kolomna in Russia.

== MTU Onsite Energy ==
MTU Onsite Energy, a Rolls-Royce Power Systems brand, provides a range of generator systems in both gas and diesel for emergency and standby power needs.

=== MTU Onsite Energy Distributors ===
1. United Engines
2. Pacific Power Group - "Pacific Power Group is now the distributor for MTU Onsite Energy in Alaska, Hawaii, Idaho, Washington and Oregon. The company also offers extended service throughout the Western U.S". In January 2016, Pacific Power Group was awarded exclusive distributorship in Alaska, which had been previously shared with another distributor.
3. Stewart & Stevenson Power Products
4. Wajax Power Systems
5. Collicutt Energy Services
6. Antilles Power Depot
7. Curtis Power Solutions

=== MTU Onsite Energy Projects ===
- Oceanic Time Warner Cable Hawaii - Oceanic Time Warner currently uses MTU Onsite energy for its backup power and power generation systems. Currently, Time Warner Cable has about 15 MTU Onsite Energy 50, 250, and 350 kW diesel gen-set and transfer switches for location on Oahu and the Big Island.
- Daimler Trucks North America - In 2014, Daimler Trucks started construction on a brand new 268,000 square-foot corporate headquarters in Portland, OR. MTU Onsite Energy 600 kWe generators were installed as the back-up power system.

== Marine engines ==
=== Diesel engines ===
- Bergen B series
- Bergen C series
- Bergen K series
- Crossley Pielstick

=== Reciprocating engines ===
- Bergen B series
- Bergen K series

== See also ==
- Maybach
- Maybach Foundation
- Daimler AG
- Rolls-Royce plc
- Maybach-Motorenbau GmbH
- Wilhelm Maybach
- Mercedes-Benz
