= Prosper L'Orange =

German engineer and inventor

- Born: 1 February 1876; Beirut
- Died: 30 July 1939 (aged 63); Stuttgart
- Education: Technische Hochschule Charlottenburg, Berlin
- Occupation: Engineer
- Engineering career
- Discipline: Automotive engineering
- Employer(s): Gasmotoren-Fabrik Deutz AG; Benz & Cie.
- Projects: diesel engine precombustion chamber

Prosper L'Orange (born 1 February 1876, Beirut; died 30 July 1939, Stuttgart) was a German engineer and inventor who pioneered the precombustion chamber (or prechamber), which made possible high-speed diesel engines that did not require an air compressor, and enabled them to be built small enough for use in road vehicles.

== Career ==
L'Orange moved to Germany and studied engineering at the Technische Hochschule in Charlottenburg (now Technische Universität Berlin). After his studies he worked for Gasmotoren-Fabrik Deutz AG as a research engineer from 1904, and from 1906 as research director. In October 1908, L'Orange moved from Deutz to Benz & Cie. in Mannheim, where he became head of Stationary Engine Construction. From 1912, on he was also a member of the Board of Directors.

In 1909, while working at Benz, he patented a precombustion chamber (DRP 230517, 14 March 1909) which made possible compact, lightweight diesel engines.

L'Orange was director of the Motoren Werke Mannheim AG (MWM) from 1922, which was formed that year when Carl Benz split up the engine division of his company.

== Precombustion chamber ==
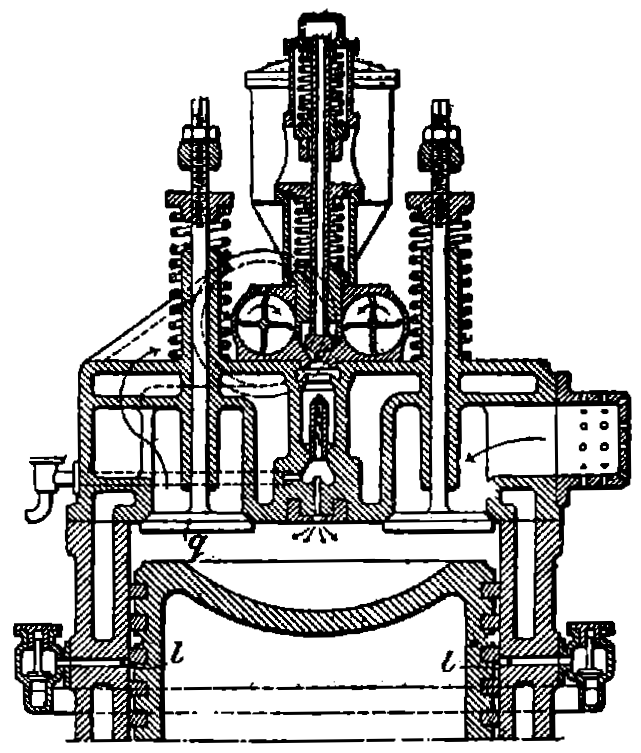

The precombustion chamber patented in 1909 by L'Orange connects to the engine cylinder via a restricted passage, or burner. In operation, a narrow cone of fuel is sprayed down towards the burner by the single orifice injector nozzle. At this time the technology did not exist to manufacture nozzles with multiple orifices and diesels used high pressure air to spray the fuel directly into the cylinder. L'Orange also discovered that indirect injection diesel engines ran more smoothly and quietly than direct injection engines. Use of a precombustion chamber also reduced stress on the engine's structure, so that it could be made less heavy than a direct injection engine. However, indirect injection engines require higher compression ratios, about 20:1, to compensate for the greater surface to volume ratio causing more heat loss from the cylinder charge. They are also more difficult to start when cold, therefore the precombustion chambers are fitted with electrically heated glowplugs.

== Legacy ==
In September 1933, L'Orange's son Rudolf (1902–1958) founded Gebrüder L'Orange Motorzubehör GmbH, whose modern-day successor is L'Orange GmbH. The company's shares were bought from the L'Orange family in 1979 by ITT Automotive, and it was later bought by MTU München in 1985, and MTU Friedrichshafen in 1995, until finally becoming a member of the Tognum group in 2006. Rolls-Royce Holdings and Daimler AG launched a takeover for Tognum in March 2011.[5] The two companies announced on 24 June 2011 that their joint €3.4 billion tender offer had been successful, with 94% of Tognum shareholders accepting.[6] Once the acquisition was complete, Tognum is run as a 50-50 joint venture, with Rolls-Royce merging its Bergen Marine diesel engines unit into the operation. The company is still prominent in injection technology for large four-stroke-cycle engines. Besides diesel direct injection, it also supplies gasoline direct injection systems.

The fuel injection systems of the Daimler-Benz DB 605 aircraft engine (as used in the Messerschmitt Bf 109 WW2 fighter and manufactured postwar under licence by Svenska Flygmotor) were equipped with L'Orange fuel injectors fed by a Bosch injection pump.

== See also ==
- Diesel engine
- Harry Ricardo
- Hot bulb engine
- History of the internal combustion engine
