= Glatten =

- Municipality
- Coat of arms

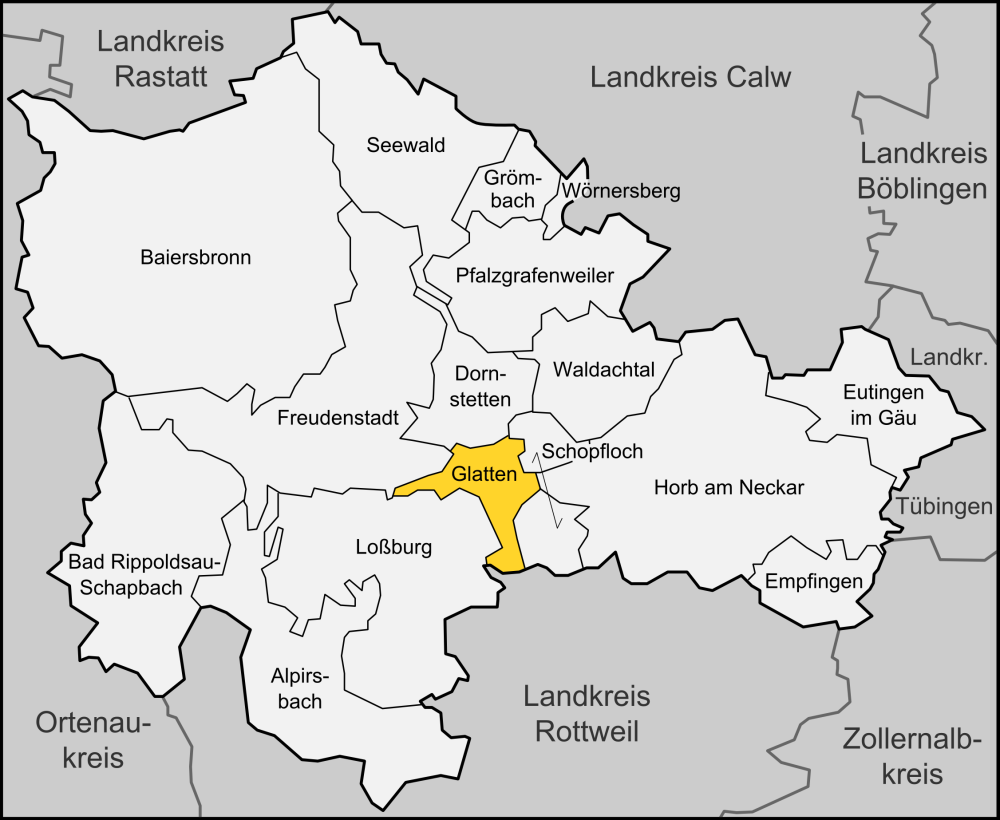
- Location of Glatten within Freudenstadt district
- Interactive map of Glatten
- Location within Germany Location within Baden-Württemberg
- Coordinates: 48°26′35″N 8°30′46″E
- Country: Germany
- State: Baden-Württemberg
- Admin. region: Karlsruhe
- District: Freudenstadt

Government
  - Mayor (2018–26): Tore-Derek Pfeifer

Area
  - Total: 15.52 km^{2} (5.99 sq mi)
- Elevation: 533 m (1,749 ft)

Population (2025-12-31)
  - Total: 2,517
  - Density: 162.2/km^{2} (420.0/sq mi)
- Time zone: UTC+01:00 (CET)
  - Summer (DST): UTC+02:00 (CEST)
- Postal codes: 72293
- Dialling codes: 07443
- Vehicle registration: FDS, HCH, HOR, WOL
- Website: www.glatten.de

Glatten (German pronunciation: [ˈɡlatn̩]) is a municipality in the district of Freudenstadt in Baden-Württemberg in Germany.

== Geography ==
=== Geographical location ===
The state-approved health resort of Glatten lies approximately ten kilometers southeast of the county town of Freudenstadt, nestled amid meadows and forests in the northern Black Forest. The town is traversed by the river Glatt, from which it takes its name. The Old High German word glat or glad translates to “clear,” “glossy,” or “pure,” reflecting the character of the water.

=== Municipality arrangement ===
The municipality of Glatten comprises the formerly independent communities of Böffingen and Neuneck. The former municipality of Böffingen includes the village itself, along with the settlements known as Bellenstein and Electrical Works. As of December 31, 1973, Glatten also incorporates the village of Glatten, the farm Lattenberg Hammerschmiede, and more local dwellings. Neuneck, once an independent municipality, includes the village of Neuneck, Rinkwasen, Schellenberg farm, and Ziegelacker farm. Within Neuneck’s territory is the deserted village of Gaisnang, where the Gaisweilerhof was the last remaining structure until its abandonment in 1632.

Both Böffingen and Neuneck retain their status as designated villages according to the Baden-Württemberg municipal code. Each maintains its village council, with a mayor serving as chairperson.

=== Neighboring communities ===
The municipality of Glatten shares borders with several neighboring towns and districts. To the north is Dornstetten, while Schopfloch and Horb are to the east. To the south, Glatten borders the Dornhan district in Rottweil. The southwest boundary meets Loßburg, and to the west is the county town of Freudenstadt.

== History ==
Glatten was first documented in the year 767 under the names "Glatheim" and "villa Gladeheim," which translate to "Home of the Straight"—with glad or glat meaning shiny, bright, or pure. These names suggest the village's origins date back to the Merovingian period. In 1308, the Count of Hohenberg acquired Glatten, along with Dornstetten, as a pledge from Anna von Fürstenberg and her husband, John of Geroldseck. By 1320, Glatten had become part of the Duchy of Württemberg.

== Religions ==
Since the Reformation, ⁣Glatten has been shaped by Protestant traditions. The village's Lutheran church, featuring a bell tower dating back to the 12th century, stands as a defining landmark and symbol of its religious heritage. To this day, there is no Roman Catholic Church in Glatten. However, the New Apostolic Church maintains a presence in the community.

== Economy and Infrastructure ==
=== Transportation ===
Glatten has a connection to the B 28, which runs through Ulm, Reutlingen, Tübingen, and Strasbourg, via the K 4760. It also connects to the B 294, a route that spans Pforzheim, Freiburg, and Basel, through the L 406.

=== Established businesses ===
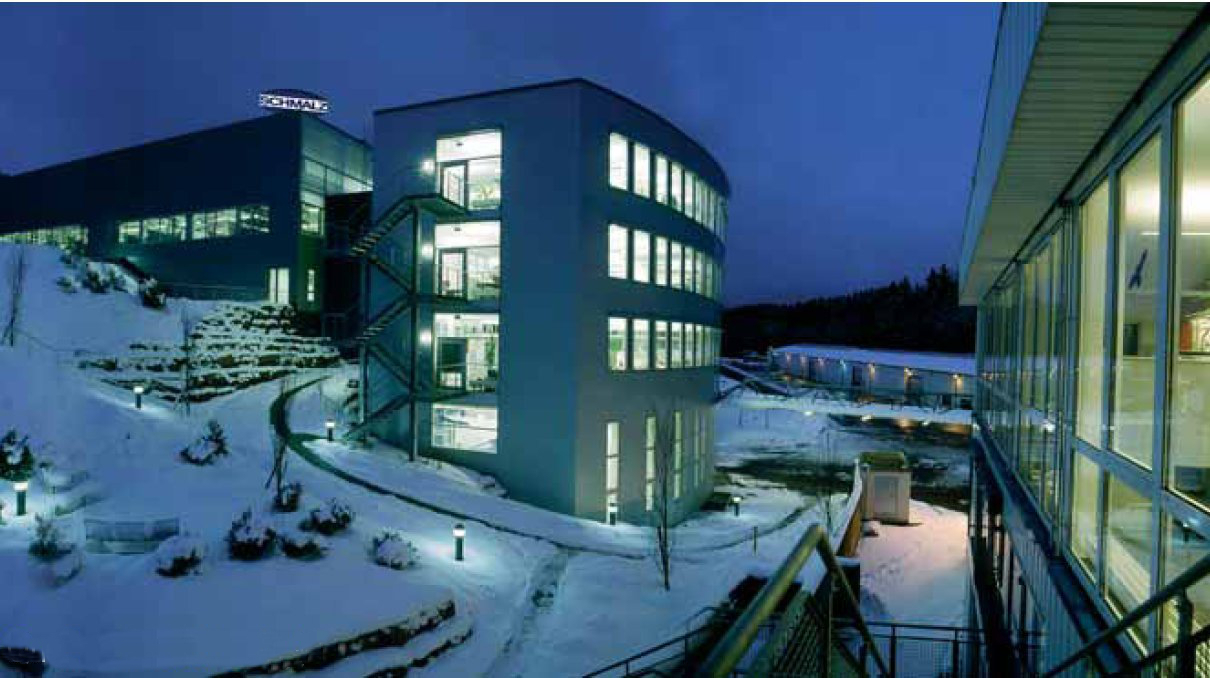
Schmalz headquarters

Located in Glatten is the headquarters of J. Schmalz GmbH, a family-owned company that has grown into a global leader in vacuum automation and handling technology, founded in 1910. It is also home to the largest production facility of Woodward L'Orange GmbH, a manufacturer of fuel injection systems for large diesel engines, established in 1933.

=== Buildings ===
Glatten has a wind power installation equipped with a 100.1 MHz, 1 kW transmitter for the Free Radio Freudenstadt, making a commitment to renewable energy and local broadcasting.

Since the 1920s, Glatten has played a key role in regional hydroelectric power generation. The Glatt and Lauter rivers are dammed in the area, with water diverted through tunnel systems to the Heimbach Reservoir near Loßburg-Sterneck. From there, it flows onward to the hydroelectric power station in Dornhan-Bettenhausen, which has been operational since 1923 and remains a historically significant energy source.

After severe flooding on February 15, 1990, a flood retention structure was constructed upstream on the Glatt River and completed in 2010. This project was initiated by the Zweckverbandes Glatt-valley, a regional association formed to manage water protection and flood control efforts.

== Notable people ==
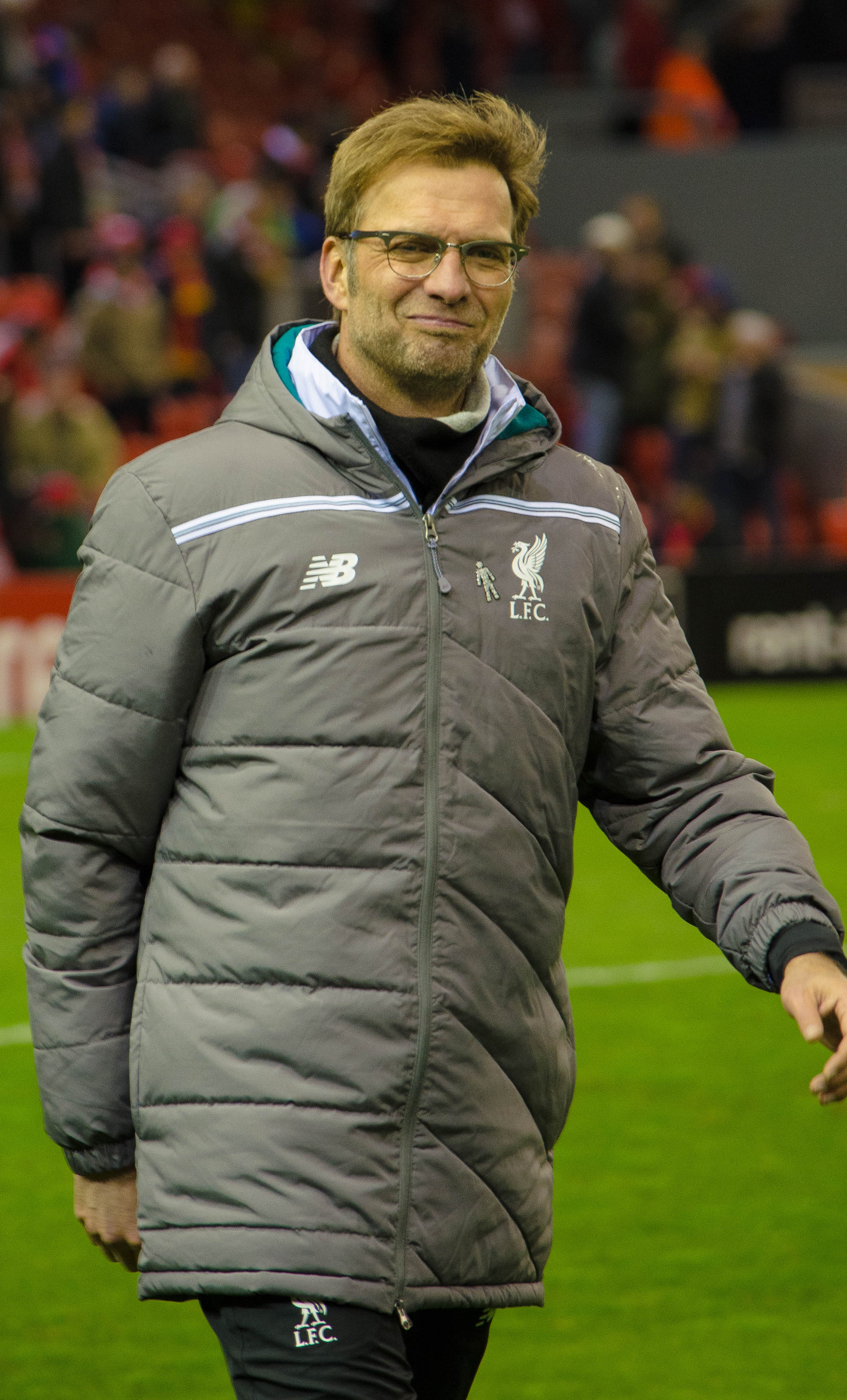
Jürgen Klopp (2016)

- Jürgen Klopp (16 June 1967), former football player, former football manager (Mainz, Dortmund, Liverpool) and Red Bull Head of Global Soccer, spent his childhood and youth in Glatten.
