= L'Orange GmbH =

German engineering company

Woodward L'Orange
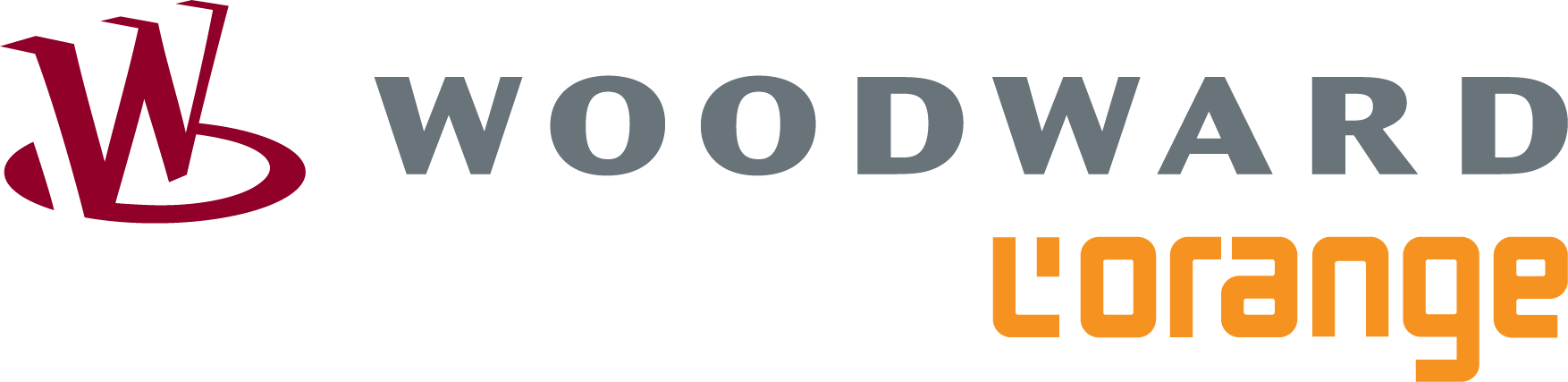
- Legal form: Limited Liability Company
- Founded: 9 September 1933
- Headquarters: Stuttgart, BW, Germany
- Management: Dr. Andreas Lingens, CEO
- Employees: More than 1,000 (1 July 2015)
- Products: Fuel injection systems in the off-highway segment and mechanical engineering
- Website: http://www.lorange.com/
- Status: February 2019

Woodward L'Orange GmbH is a German engineering manufacturing company headquartered in Stuttgart. It is one of the leading manufacturers of injection systems for large diesel engines worldwide. It developed and produced the first common-rail system for large diesel engines. Woodward L'Orange is a supplier to engine builders and has been part of Woodward since 2018. Previously the L'Orange GmbH belonged to the Rolls-Royce Power Systems AG.

== History ==
On 9 September 1933, Rudolf L'Orange, son of Prosper L'Orange, together with his brother Harro, founded the Gebrüder L'Orange Motorzubehör GmbH (L'Orange Brothers Engine Accessories Company) in Stuttgart. Initially, they produced stamps, cylinders, needles and needle guides for injection pumps for aircraft and marine engines. His father had sold his inventions and manufacturing rights to the Robert Bosch AG, and this led to the foundation of the company.

In Hamburg, L'Orange founded the Norddeutsche L'Orange GmbH Hamburg subsidiary (North German L'Orange Company Hamburg) to be able to supply the navy with its products. With the advent of new drive technologies, Rudolf L'Orange developed and invented new injection systems, such as the "zweimengendüse" for continuous atomization. Due to the positive response to his products, he was able to open three further operations: in Dresden, in Niederschöneweide near Berlin, and in Dębno in Pomerania. To escape destruction during World War II, the Berlin operation was moved to Glatten in the Black Forest.

In 1947, once the war ended, a new start for the young company was planned. Together with Karl Maybach, who used the L'Orange direct current system for its high-speed, lightweight diesel engines for locomotives and ships, the company was successful once again. Around 1950, L'Orange, together with Maybach, developed the pump-nozzle system that soon became indispensable for large diesel engines thanks to the many benefits it delivered. This invention brought L'Orange so much success, that further locations were opened in Munich, Hamburg and Stuttgart-Zuffenhausen.

After the death of Rudolf L'Orange in 1958, his widow continued the business until 1978.

In 1979, ITT Automotiv took over all the shares of the L'Orange family, then selling them to MTU München in 1985. Soon thereafter, in 1989, the second production plant in Wolfratshausen was inaugurated. In 1995, L'Orange was sold to MTU Friedrichshafen and then in 2006, incorporated into the Tognum Group (Rolls-Royce Power Systems AG since 2014). In 2009, the L'Orange Fuel Injection Trading (Suzhou) Co., Ltd. subsidiary was founded in China. In 2014, L'Orange founded its third production location in Ningbo (China), which was also the first plant to be established outside Germany. In April 2018 Rolls-Royce Power Systems sold the company to its competitor Woodward in the USA.

== Locations ==
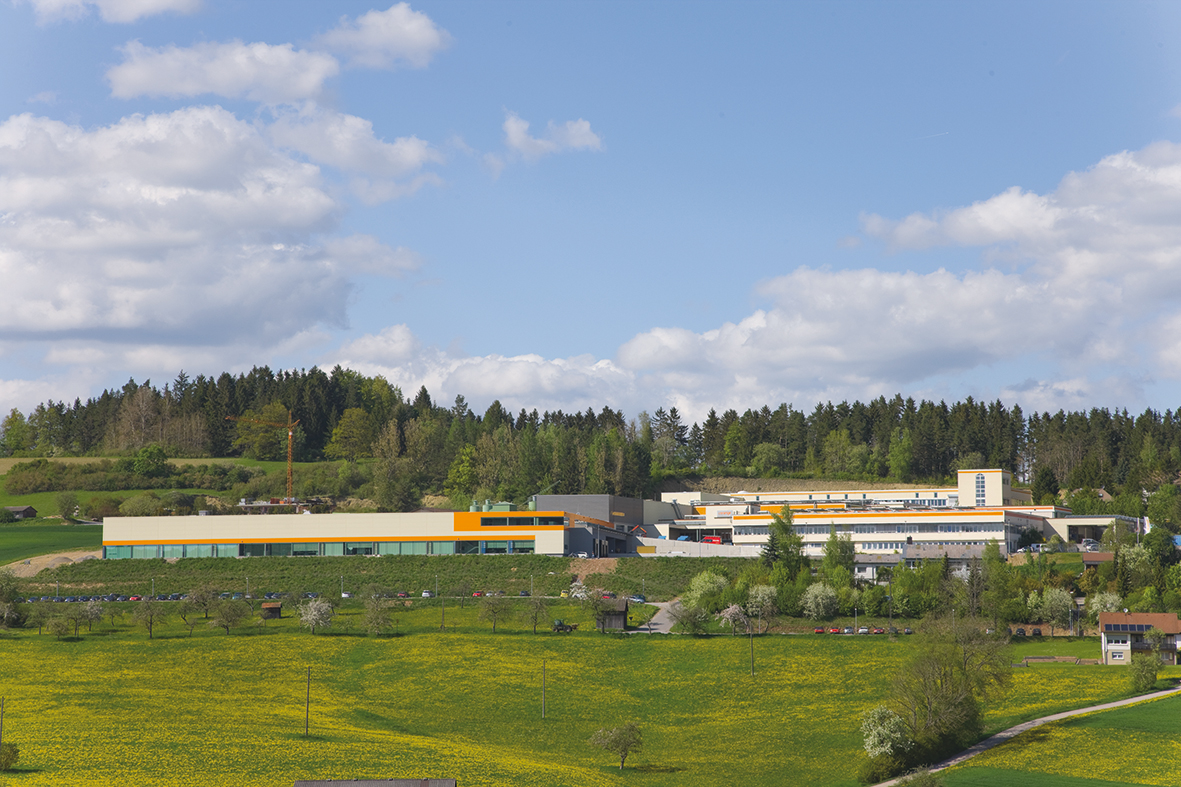
Woodward L'Orange's site in Glatten, Germany

Woodward L'Orange currently has four locations in Germany and two subsidiaries in China – L'Orange Fuel Injection Trading (Suzhou) Co., Ltd. and L'Orange Fuel Injection (Ningbo) Co. Ltd.. Management, development and sales are headquartered in Stuttgart-Zuffenhausen. The first and largest production plant is located in Glatten near Freudenstadt, where the entire product portfolio is manufactured. Injection nozzles are manufactured at the second production site in Wolfratshausen. The Woodward L'Orange service centers are located in Rellingen near Hamburg and Suzhou in China. The third production facility is located in Ningbo in China.
