= Harry Ricardo =

British engineer (1885-1974)

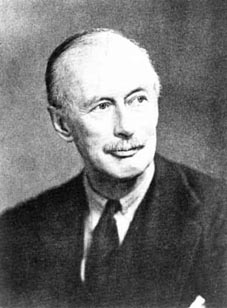
- Born: Harry Ralph Ricardo; 26 January 1885; London, England
- Died: 18 May 1974 (aged 89)
- Education: Rugby School; Trinity College, Cambridge
- Spouse: Beatrice Bertha Hale (m. 1911)
- Children: 3 daughters
- Parents: Halsey Ralph Ricardo (father); Catherine Jane Rendel (mother)
- Relatives: Alexander Meadows Rendel (grandfather)
- Engineering career
- Institutions: Institution of Mechanical Engineers Royal Aircraft Establishment
- Projects: Mk V tank engine Citroen Rosalie diesel engine Turbulent Head gasoline combustion system Comet diesel combustion system Rolls-Royce Crecy; Rolls-Royce Merlin
- Significant advance: Diesel and Spark Ignition combustion systems Aero engines
- Awards: Knight Batchelor; Fellow of the Royal Society

Sir Harry Ralph Ricardo (26 January 1885 – 18 May 1974) was an English engineer who was one of the foremost engine designers and researchers in the early years of the development of the internal combustion engine.

Among his many other works, he improved the engines that were used in the first tanks, oversaw the research into the physics of internal combustion that led to the use of octane ratings, was instrumental in development of the sleeve valve engine design, and invented the Diesel "Comet" Swirl chamber that made high-speed diesel engines economically feasible.

== Early life ==
Harry Ricardo was born at 13 Bedford Square, London, in 1885, the eldest of three children, and only son of Halsey Ricardo, the architect, and his wife Catherine Jane, daughter of Sir Alexander Meadows Rendel, a civil engineer. Ricardo was descended from a brother of the famous political economist David Ricardo, a Sephardi Jew of Portuguese origin. He was one of the first people in England to see an automobile when his grandfather purchased one in 1898. He was from a relatively wealthy family and educated at Rugby School. In October 1903 he matriculated at Trinity College, Cambridge as a civil engineering student. Ricardo had been using tools and building engines since the age of ten.

== Marriage ==
In 1911 Ricardo married Beatrice Bertha Hale, an art student at the Slade School of Art, in London. Her father, Charles Bowdich Hale, was the Ricardos' family doctor. They had three daughters, and lived most of their married life at Lancing and Edburton in West Sussex.

== Car engines ==
In 1904, at the end of his first year at Cambridge, Ricardo decided to enter the University Automobile Club's event, which was a competition to design a machine that could travel the furthest on 1 imperial quart (1.14 L) of petrol. His engine had a single cylinder, and was the heaviest entered, but his motorcycle design won the competition by covering a distance of 40 miles (64 km). He was then persuaded to join Bertram Hopkinson, Professor of Mechanism and Applied Mechanics, researching engine performance. He graduated in 1906 and spent another year researching at Cambridge.

Ricardo is said by Percy Kidner, then co-managing director of Vauxhall, to have had a hand in the design of the Vauxhall engine designed by Laurence Pomeroy for the RAC 2,000 miles (3,200 km) trial of 1908.

Before graduation, Ricardo designed a two-stroke motorcycle engine to study the effect of mixture strength upon the combustion process. When he graduated, the small firm of Messrs Lloyd and Plaister expressed interest in making the engine. Ricardo produced designs for two sizes, and the smaller one sold about 50 engines until 1914, when the war halted production.

In 1909 Ricardo designed a novel two-stroke split cycle 3.3-litre engine for his cousin Ralph Ricardo, who had established a small car manufacturing company, "Two Stroke Engine Company", at Shoreham-by-Sea. The engine was to be used in the Dolphin car. The cars were well made, but they cost more to make than the selling price. The company fared better making two-stroke engines for fishing boats. In 1911 the firm collapsed and Ralph departed for India. Ricardo continued to design engines for small electric lighting sets; these were produced by two companies until 1914.

Interest in the 1909 Ricardo designed split cycle Dolphin engine continues and in 2017 Ricardo PLC formed a new consortium called Dolphin-N2 to further develop the concept. In 2019 Dolphin N2 was purchased by FPT Industrial, who claim the recuperated split cycle engine has the potential to reduce fossil fuel use by up to 30% whilst simultaneously reducing air pollutants to well below any future planned legislation.

== Tank engines ==
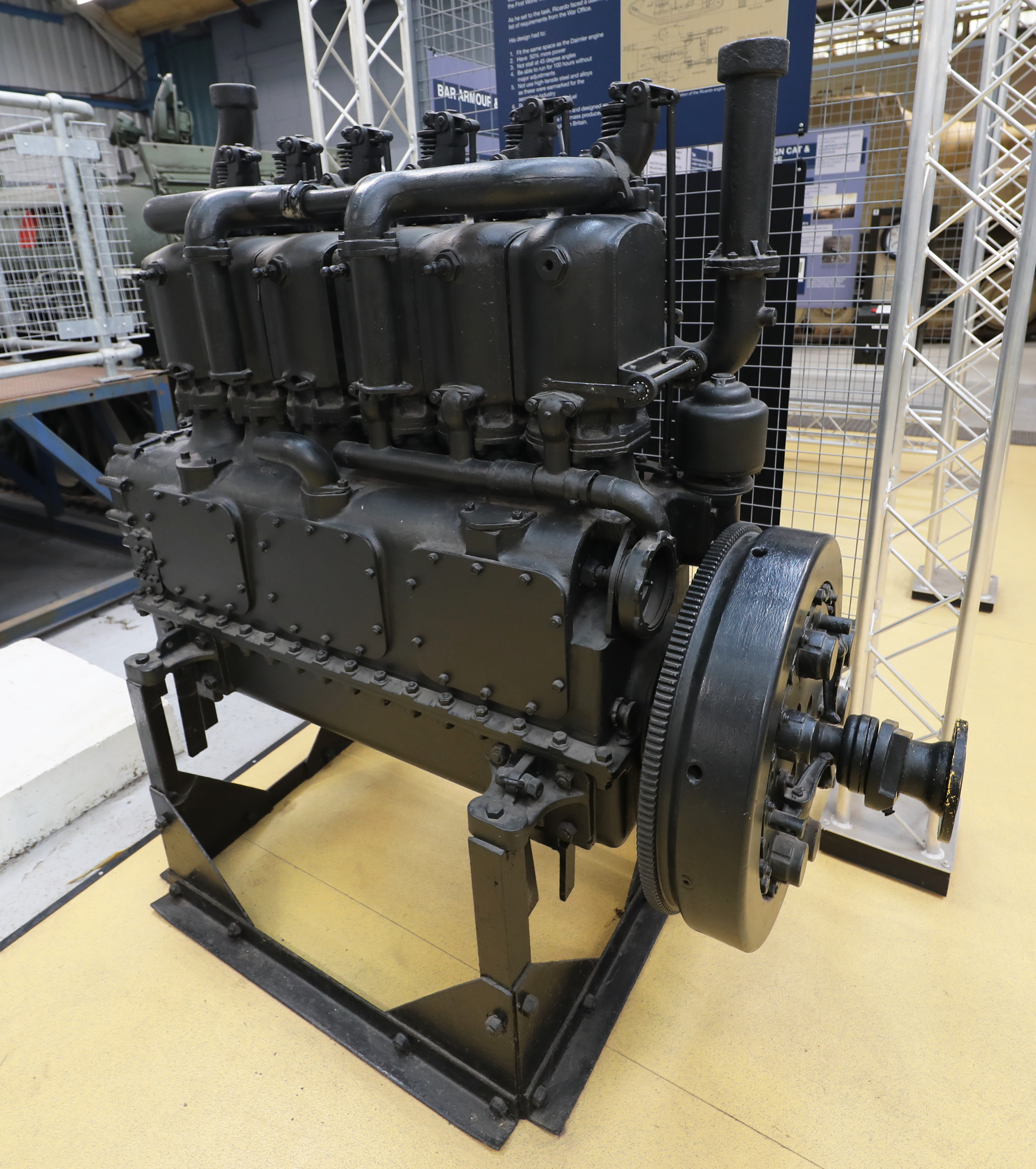
Harry Ricardo tank engine

In 1915 Ricardo set up a new company, "Engine Patents Ltd.", which developed the engine that would eventually be used in the first successful tank design, the British Mark V. The Daimler sleeve-valve engine used in the Mark I created copious amounts of smoke, which easily gave away its position. Ricardo was asked to look at the problem of reducing smoky exhaust gases and decided that a new engine was needed. Existing companies were able to fulfill the construction of such an engine but not the design, so Ricardo set himself to the task. He succeeded in designing a new six-cylinder engine with reduced smoke emissions, which was also much more powerful, and still fit into the same space as the existing one. It produced 150 hp (110 kW), compared with 105 hp (78 kW), and later modifications produced 225 hp (168 kW) and 260 hp (190 kW)

By April 1917 one hundred engines were being produced a week. A total of over 8,000 engines were put into military service, powering all of the British heavy tanks of the First World War since the Mark V. In addition, several hundred of the 150 hp (110 kW) engines were also used in France for providing power and light to base workshops, hospitals, camps, etc.

== Aircraft engines ==
In 1917 his old mentor, Bertram Hopkinson, who was now Technical Director at the Air Ministry, invited Ricardo to join the new engine research facility at the Department of Military Aeronautics, later to become the RAE. In 1918 Hopkinson was killed while flying a Bristol Fighter, and Ricardo took over his position. From that point on the department produced a string of experimental engines and research reports that constantly drove the British, and world, engine industry.

One of Ricardo's first major research projects was on the problems of irregular combustion, known as knocking or pinging. To study the problem he built a unique variable-compression test engine. This led to the development of an octane rating system for fuels, and considerable investment into octane improving additives and refining systems. The dramatic reduction in fuel use as a result of higher-octane fuel was directly responsible for allowing Alcock and Brown to fly the Atlantic in their Vickers Vimy bombers adapted with his modifications.

== Advances in engine design ==
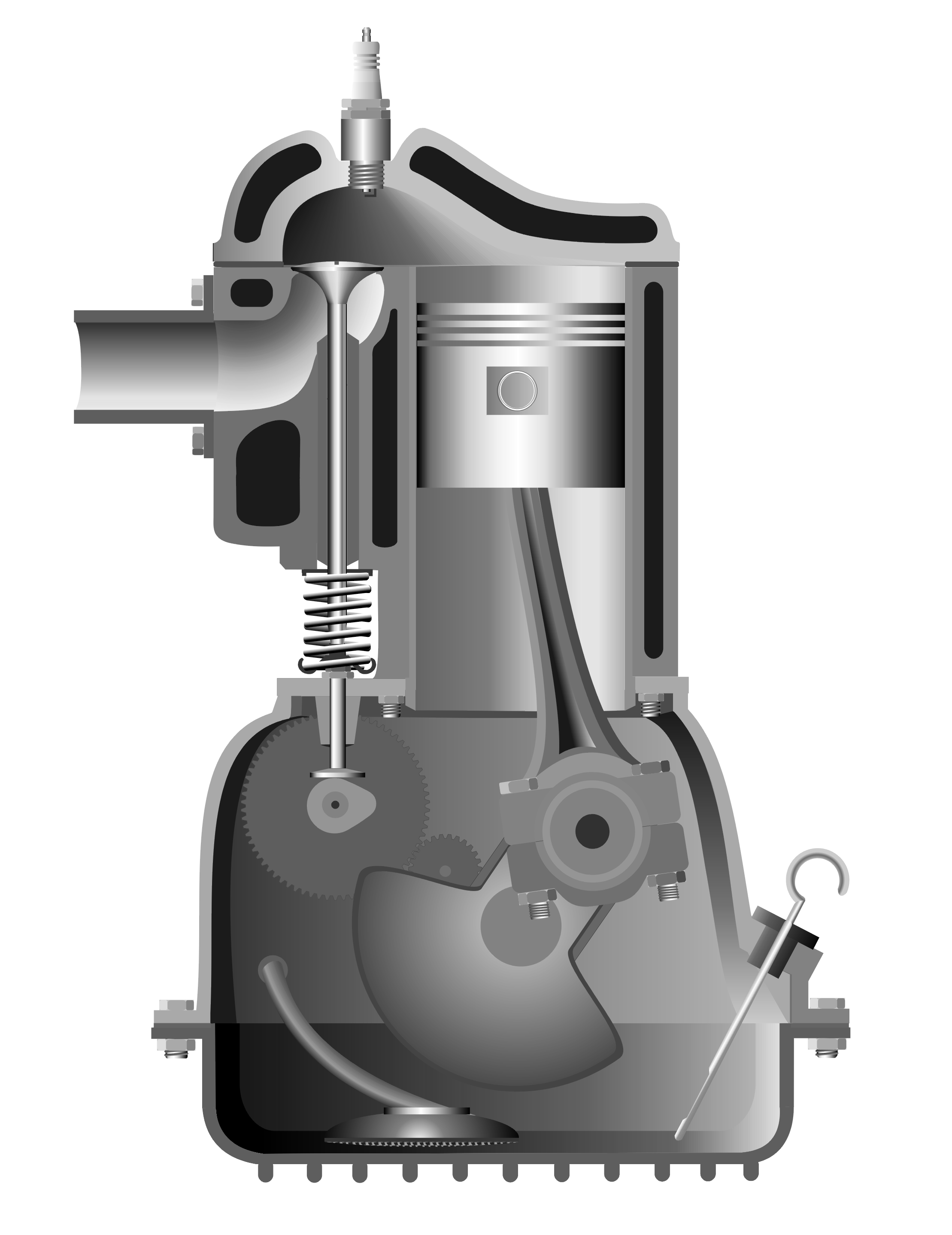
Side valve engine with Ricardo's "Turbulent Head"

In 1919 Ricardo was studying the phenomena affecting the combustion within the petrol engine and the diesel engine. He realised that turbulence within the combustion chamber increased flame speed, and that he could achieve this by offsetting the cylinder head. He also realised that making the chamber as compact as possible would reduce the distance that the flame had to travel and would reduce the likelihood of detonation. He later developed the induction swirl chamber, which was an attempt to achieve orderly air motion in a diesel engine, the swirl being initiated by inclined ports and accentuated by forcing the air into a small cylindrical volume. Finally he developed the compression swirl chamber for diesel engines. This design embodied intense swirl with a reasonable rate of pressure rise and good fuel consumption.

The compression swirl chamber design was called a "Comet" design (patented in 1931) and was subsequently licensed to a large number of companies for use in trucks, buses, tractors and cranes, as well as private cars and taxis. A Comet combustion chamber was used in the first Associated Equipment Company (AEC) diesel buses operated in 1931 by London General Omnibus Co, later part of the London Passenger Transport Board/London Transport. A later development of it featured in the world's first volume production diesel passenger car, the 1934 Citroën Rosalie. This meant that Britain led the world in the field of high-speed diesels for road transport at that time. This advantage was lost to the United Kingdom as a result of the heavy tax imposed on diesel fuel in the budget of 1938.

Ricardo designed the 1921 T.T. Vauxhall engine which was described by Cecil Clutton in Motor Sport as a tour de force in the 1922 RAC T. T. O Payne in the Ricardo Vauxhall came 3rd, Jean Chassagne on a 1921 Grand Prix Sunbeam winning outright. The engine was later developed by Mays and Villiers, who fitted a supercharger, and was still a winner fifteen years later.

In 1922 and 1923 Ricardo published a two-volume work "The Internal Combustion Engine".

Although Ricardo did not invent the sleeve valve, in 1927, he produced a seminal research paper that outlined the advantages of the sleeve valve, and suggested that poppet valve engines would not be able to offer power outputs much beyond 1500 hp (1,100 kW). A number of sleeve valve aircraft engines were developed following this paper, notably by Napier, Bristol and Rolls-Royce. Bristol produced the Perseus, Hercules, Taurus and the Centaurus, Napier produced the Napier Sabre, and Rolls-Royce produced the Eagle and Crecy, all using sleeve valves.

In 1929 Ricardo was elected Fellow of the Royal Society.

== World War II ==
Ricardo's work on the sleeve valve affected the development of British aircraft engines in the thirties and during the war. He enhanced the Rolls-Royce Merlin engine in the Mosquito by giving it an oxygen enrichment system to improve its performance.

Ricardo also assisted in the design of the combustion chambers and fuel control system of Sir Frank Whittle's jet engine.

== Post war period ==
In 1974, at the age of 89, Ricardo suffered a pelvic injury in a fall. He died six weeks later, on 18 May.

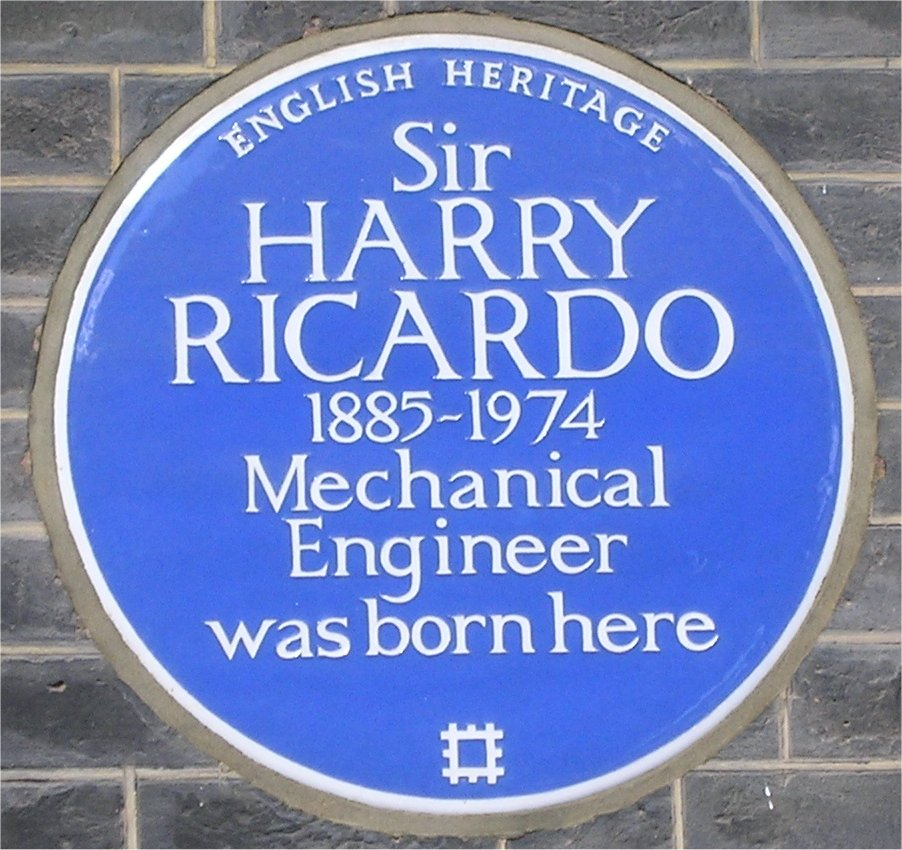
Blue plaque on 13 Bedford Square, London

On 16 June 2005 a blue plaque was placed outside the house where Ricardo was born in Bedford Square, London. On 1 July 2010, the Institution of Mechanical Engineers bestowed an Engineering Heritage Award on Sir Harry Ricardo in recognition of his life and work as one of the foremost engineers of the twentieth century. The first internal combustion engine which Harry Ricardo designed and built as a schoolboy currently displays this Engineering Heritage plaque in the Ricardo plc company exhibition area.

== Ricardo PLC ==
In 1915, Ricardo formed Engine Patents Ltd, the company which is today known as Ricardo PLC. In this year he was contacted by the Royal Naval Air Service to help with the design of a device to manoeuvre battle tanks into position aboard railway wagons. Around 8000 engines were produced to power the tanks, making this engine the UK's first mass-produced internal combustion engine. Many more of these engines found further applications powering generators in workshops, hospitals and camps. The success of this venture yielded £30,000 in royalties and led to Ricardo being able to buy the land and set up the company on its present site in 1919.

== Books ==
- Ricardo, Harry R. Sir (1922). The Internal Combustion Engine: Slow-Speed Engines. Vol. I (1st ed.). London: Blackie.
- — (1923). The Internal Combustion Engine: High-Speed Engines. Vol. II (1st ed.). London: Blackie.
- — (1926). Engines of High Output: thermo-dynamic considerations. Macdonald and Evans.
- — (1931). The High-Speed Internal Combustion Engine (2nd ed.). Glasgow: Blackie. revised
- —; revised by Glyde, H. S. (1941). The High-Speed Internal Combustion Engine (3rd ed.). Glasgow: Blackie.
- — (1953). The High-Speed Internal Combustion Engine (4th ed.). Glasgow: Blackie. "...an entirely fresh start."
- — (1968). Memories and Machines: The Pattern of my Life. London: Constable.

== See also ==
- British Rail 10100
- Francis Rodwell Banks
- Prosper L'Orange
- Ricardo plc
- Triumph Ricardo
- Triumph slant-four engine

Professional and academic associations
Preceded by Frederick Charles Lea	President of the Institution of Mechanical Engineers; 1944	Succeeded by Andrew Robertson
