= Indirect injection =

Engine fuel delivery method

Indirect injection in an internal combustion engine is fuel injection where fuel is not directly injected into the combustion chamber.

Gasoline engines equipped with indirect injection systems, wherein a fuel injector delivers the fuel at some point before the intake valve, have mostly fallen out of favor to direct injection. However, certain manufacturers such as Volkswagen, Toyota and Ford have developed a 'dual injection' system, combining direct injectors with port (indirect) injectors, combining the benefits of both types of fuel injection. Direct injection allows the fuel to be precisely metered into the combustion chamber under high pressure which can lead to greater power and fuel efficiency. The issue with direct injection is that it typically leads to greater amounts of particulate matter and with the fuel no longer contacting the intake valves, carbon can accumulate on the intake valves over time. Adding indirect injection keeps fuel spraying on the intake valves, reducing or eliminating the carbon accumulation on intake valves and in low load conditions, indirect injection allows for better fuel-air mixing. This system is mainly used in higher cost models due to the added expense and complexity.

Port injection refers to the spraying of the fuel onto the back of the intake valve, which speeds its evaporation.

An indirect injection diesel engine delivers fuel into a chamber off the combustion chamber, either a prechamber or swirl chamber, where combustion begins and then spreads into the main combustion chamber. The prechamber is carefully designed to ensure adequate mixing of the atomized fuel with the compression-heated air.

== Gasoline engines ==
An advantage of indirect injection gasoline engines versus direct injection gasoline engines is that deposits on intake valves from the crankcase ventilation system are washed by the fuel. Indirect injection engines also tend to produce lower amounts of particulate matter compared to direct injection engines as the fuel and air are more uniformly mixed.

== Diesel engines ==
=== Overview ===
The purpose of the divided combustion chamber is to speed the combustion process, and to increase power output by increasing engine speed. The addition of a prechamber increases heat loss to the cooling system and thereby lowers engine efficiency. The engine requires glow plugs for starting. In an indirect injection system the air moves fast, mixing the fuel and air. This simplifies engine (piston crown, head, valves, injector, prechamber, etc.) design and allows the use of less tightly toleranced designs which are simpler to manufacture and more reliable. Direct injection, by contrast, uses slow-moving air and fast-moving fuel; both the design and manufacture of the injectors is more difficult. The optimisation of the in-cylinder air flow is much more difficult than designing a prechamber. There is much more integration between the design of the injector and the engine. It is for this reason that car diesel engines were almost all indirect injection until the ready availability of powerful CFD simulation systems made the adoption of direct injection practical.

=== Classification of indirect combustion chambers ===
==== Swirl chamber ====
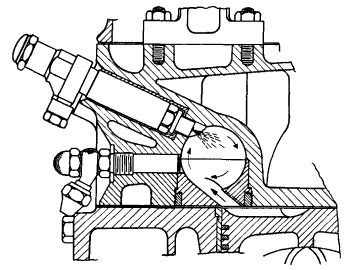
Ricardo Comet swirl chamber

Swirl chambers are spherical cavities located in the cylinder head and separated from the engine cylinder by a tangential throat. About 50% of the air enters the swirl chamber during the compression stroke of the engine, producing a swirl. After combustion, the products return through the same throat to the main cylinder at much higher velocity, so more heat is lost to the walls of the passage. This type of chamber finds application in engines in which fuel control and engine stability are more important than fuel economy. These are also called Ricardo chambers, named after the inventor, Sir Harry Ricardo.

==== Precombustion chamber ====
This chamber is located at the cylinder head and is connected to the engine cylinder by small holes. It occupies 40% of the total cylinder volume. During the compression stroke, air from the main cylinder enters the precombustion chamber. At this moment, fuel is injected into the precombustion chamber and combustion begins. Pressure increases and the fuel droplets are forced through the small holes into the main cylinder, resulting in a very good mix of the fuel and air. The bulk of the combustion actually takes place in the main cylinder. This type of combustion chamber has multi-fuel capability because the temperature of the prechamber vaporizes the fuel before the main combustion event occurs.

==== Air cell chamber ====
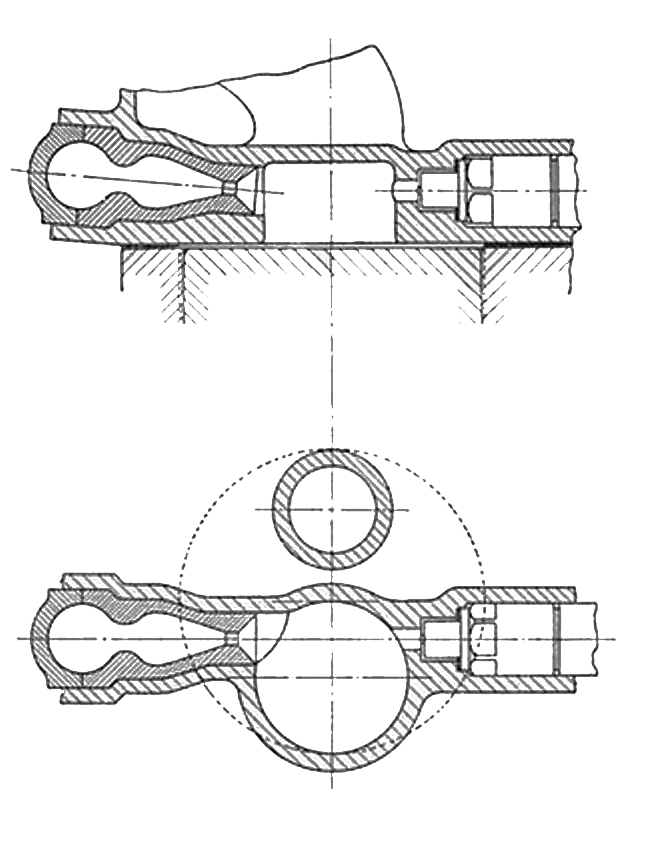
Acro-type injection system, the predecessor of the Lanova, also designed by Franz Lang

The air cell is a small cylindrical chamber with a hole in one end. It is mounted more or less coaxially with the injector, said axis being parallel to the piston crown, with the injector firing across a small cavity which is open to the cylinder into the hole in the end of the air cell. The air cell is mounted so as to minimise thermal contact with the mass of the head. A pintle injector with a narrow spray pattern is used. At its top dead centre (TDC) the majority of the charge mass is contained in the cavity and air cell.

When the injector fires, the jet of fuel enters the air cell and ignites. This results in a jet of flame shooting back out of the air cell directly into the jet of fuel still issuing from the injector. The heat and turbulence give excellent fuel vaporisation and mixing properties. Also, since the majority of the combustion takes place outside the air cell in the cavity, which communicates directly with the cylinder, there is less heat loss involved in transferring the burning charge into the cylinder.

Air cell injection can be considered as a compromise between indirect and direct injection, gaining some of the efficiency advantages of direct injection while retaining the simplicity and ease of development of indirect injection.

Air cell chambers are commonly named Lanova air chambers. The Lanova combustion system was developed by the Lanova company, which was founded in 1929 by Franz Lang, Gotthard Wielich and Albert Wielich.

In the US, the Lanova system was used by Mack Trucks. An example is the Mack-Lanova ED diesel engine fitted to the Mack NR truck.

=== Advantages of indirect injection combustion chambers ===
- Smaller diesels can be produced.
- The injection pressure required is low, so the injector is cheaper to produce.
- The injection direction is of less importance.
- Indirect injection is much simpler to design and manufacture, especially for gasoline engines. Less injector development is required and the injection pressures are low (1500 psi/100 bar versus 5000 psi/345 bar and higher for direct injection)
- The lower stresses that indirect injection imposes on internal components mean that it is possible to produce petrol and indirect injection diesel versions of the same basic engine. At best such types differed only in the cylinder head and the need to fit a distributor and spark plugs in the petrol version whilst fitting an injection pump and injectors to the diesel. Examples include the BMC A-Series and B-Series engines and the Land Rover 2.25/2.5-litre 4-cylinder types. Such designs allow petrol and diesel versions of the same vehicle to be built with minimal design changes between them.
- Higher engine speeds can be reached, since burning continues in the prechamber.
- Alternative fuels like bio-diesel and waste vegetable oil are less likely to damage the fuel system in an indirect-injection diesel engine, as high injection pressures are not needed. In direct-injection engines (especially modern engines using high-pressure common rail fuel systems), keeping fuel filters in good condition is more critical as debris can damage the pumps and injectors when waste vegetable oil or waste engine oil are used.

=== Disadvantages ===
- Fuel efficiency with diesel engines is lower than with direct injection as the larger exposed areas tend to dissipate more heat and the air moving through the ports tending to increase pressure drops. However, using higher compression ratios will somewhat negate this inefficiency.
- Glow plugs are needed for a cold engine start on diesel engines; many indirect injection diesel engines cannot start at all in cold weather without glow plugs.
- Because the heat and pressure of combustion is applied to a very small area on the piston as it exits the precombustion chamber or swirl chamber, such engines are less suited to high specific power outputs (such as turbocharging, supercharging, or tuning) than direct injection diesels. The increased temperature and pressure on one part of the piston crown causes uneven expansion which can lead to cracking, distortion, or other damage, although advancements in manufacturing techniques have allowed manufacturers to largely mitigate the effects of uneven expansion, allowing for indirect injection diesels to use turbocharging.
- Indirect engines are often much noisier than direct injection common-rail engines.
- Starting fluid ("ether") often cannot be used in an indirect injection diesel engine as the glow plugs greatly increase the risk of preignition compared to direct injection diesels.

== See also ==
- Harry Ricardo
- Prosper L'Orange
- Premixed flame
