= J. Schmalz =

J. Schmalz GmbH
- Type: GmbH
- Industry: Automation
- Founded: 1910
- Founder: Johannes Schmalz
- Headquarters: Glatten, Germany
- Key people: Kurt Schmalz (Managing Partner); Andreas Beutel (Managing Director)
- Revenue: €207.3M (2022)
- Number of employees: 1,800 (2022)
- Website: www.schmalz.com

J. Schmalz GmbH is a manufacturer of automation technology based in Glatten, Germany. The family-run company is one of the leading suppliers of vacuum technology in the fields of automation and manual handling and is also active in the energy storage business area. Over the years, the company's products changed from razor blades to transport equipment and finally to vacuum technology.

The Schmalz Group employs 1,800 people, 1,164 of whom work at J. Schmalz GmbH (2022).

== History ==
=== Foundation and beginnings ===
In 1910, Johannes Schmalz founded the Johannes Schmalz Rasierklingenfabrik in Glatten with the "Glattis" razor blade brand.

=== Expansion at home and abroad ===
The proliferation of the electric shaver required the company to change its focus. Subsequently, the production of trailers and transportation equipment for agriculture and industry began. In 1948, Johannes Schmalz's son Artur took over the management of the company and developed products in the field of light vehicles.

When Kurt Schmalz took over the management of the company in 1984, focus shifted to vacuum technology. In 1990, his brother Wolfgang Schmalz joined the company's management.

1998 saw the opening of the company's first branch office in Switzerland. One year later, Schmalz entered the US market with the establishment of a branch in Raleigh, North Carolina.

From 2009 to 2017, Schmalz expanded the Glatten site to include additional production facilities, a research and testing center and a communication center for employees and visitors. Schmalz invested around €6 million in the expansion, with energy-saving measures at its headquarters and the creation of creative spaces for employees. At the end of 2017, Wolfgang Schmalz stepped down from the Management Board and joined the company's Advisory Board.

=== Acquisitions and realignment ===
In 2017, Schmalz acquired all shares in Stuttgart-based Gesellschaft für Produktionssysteme GmbH (GPS), which was founded as an offshoot of the Fraunhofer Institute for Manufacturing Engineering and Automation. GPS is active in the fields of hardware, software and data aggregation, among others.

The company entered the Australian market in 2018 with the acquisition of Millsom Hoists, who had been their distributor in the area for thirty years previously.

In January 2022, the British company Palamatic Ltd., which develops handling systems for the pharmaceutical and chemical industries, was acquired. Two months later, Schmalz acquired the Swedish company Binar Handling AB and its subsidiaries in China, France, Germany and Turkey. The company is a manufacturer of cranes, balancers and end effectors based in Trollhättan, Sweden.

In June 2023, Schmalz presented its own redox flow battery systems.

== Corporate structure ==
J. Schmalz GmbH is the parent company of the Schmalz Group. The Schmalz Group consists of the companies Schmalz, Binar Handling, Palamatic and Gesellschaft für Produktionssysteme (GPS), among others.

In the 2022 financial year, the Schmalz Group employed around 1,800 people internationally, including 1,164 employees at J. Schmalz GmbH, and it generated a revenue of €207.3 million.

Schmalz is represented by trading partners and 31 locations in over 80 countries in Europe, Asia, Australia, and North America.

In addition to Germany, Italy, Eastern Europe, the United States, China and Japan are among the most important markets for Schmalz.

== Products ==
Schmalz is active in the fields of vacuum automation, manual handling and energy storage. The technologies and products developed by Schmalz are primarily aimed at the logistics, automotive, wood, electronics, food, plastics, and furniture industries.

=== Vacuum technology ===
In the field of vacuum technology, Schmalz produces gripping systems such as mounting elements, system monitors, suction pads, lifters, generators, or crane systems with vacuum technology for manual and automated production processes. The grippers are developed in different designs, sizes, and materials depending on the requirements of use. In addition to the grippers, Schmalz manufactures other components of vacuum systems, including valves and switches. The company also produces vacuum clamping systems that are used in CNC machine tools.

For the battery technology sector, Schmalz manufactures automated grippers and end effectors that enable the precise transportation of cathodes, anodes, separators, and pouch cells as well as pressure-free and particle-free handling of battery, fuel and solar cells. Other components of the business division are production systems, plastics and handling technology.

=== Energy storage ===
The energy storage division develops intermediate storage options for renewable energy. Schmalz uses redox flow battery systems for this purpose, which use liquid media in external tanks to store energy.

== Sustainability ==
In 2020, Schmalz became one of the first companies to join the Baden-Württemberg Climate Alliance. Members of the alliance aim to reduce their overall energy consumption, produce carbon dioxide-free and ultimately become climate-neutral. At this point, Schmalz was already generating around 80% of its energy from wind and hydropower, photovoltaics, solar parks and wood chip plants. The remaining electricity required was purchased from a regional CO2 -neutral supplier. Large stationary batteries are used for energy storage. By August 2022, Schmalz was able to generate more energy than the company actually needed.

Schmalz is also a founding member of the Baden-Württemberg Sustainability Initiative (WIN). As part of the H2 Black Forest initiative, Schmalz is part of the ReduCO2 sustainability project, which aims to reduce carbon dioxide emissions.

== Awards ==
- 2019: National German Sustainability Award for medium-sized companies, by a jury of experts from industry practice, civil society, consulting, and research
- 2020: Award as Germany's innovation leader by the FAZ Institute
- 2021: Grand Prize for Small and Medium-Sized Enterprises, awarded by the Oskar Patzelt Foundation
