= MTU Friedrichshafen =

Commercial internal combustion engine manufacturer

MTU Friedrichshafen GmbH
- Trade name: MTU Solutions
- Type: Subsidiary
- Industry: Manufacturing
- Founded: 23 March 1909; 117 years ago
- Founder: Wilhelm Maybach
- Headquarters: Friedrichshafen, Germany
- Key people: Joerg Stratmann (CEO)
- Products: Diesel engines & generators, molten carbonate fuel cells
- Owner: Rolls-Royce Power Systems
- Parent: Rolls-Royce Holdings
- Website: www.mtu-solutions.com

MTU Friedrichshafen GmbH, trading as MTU Solutions (stylised as mtu Solutions) is a German manufacturer of commercial internal combustion engines founded by Wilhelm Maybach and his son Karl Maybach in 1909. MTU derives from Motoren- und Turbinen-Union meaning 'Motor (Engine) and Turbine Union'.

Wilhelm Maybach was the technical director of Daimler-Motoren-Gesellschaft (DMG), a predecessor company of the German multinational automotive corporation Daimler AG, until he left in 1907. On 23 March 1909, he founded the new company, Luftfahrzeug-Motorenbau GmbH (Aircraft Engine Manufacturing Corp), with his son Karl Maybach as director. A few years later the company was renamed to Maybach-Motorenbau GmbH (Maybach Engine Manufacturing Corp), which originally developed and manufactured diesel and petrol engines for Zeppelins, and then railcars. The Maybach Mb.IVa was used in aircraft and airships of World War I.

The company first built an experimental car in 1919, with the first production model introduced two years later at the Berlin Motor Show. Between 1921 and 1940, the company produced various classic opulent vehicles. The company also continued to build heavy duty diesel engines for marine and rail purposes. During World War II, Maybach produced the engines for Germany's medium and heavy tanks. The company was renamed MTU Friedrichshafen in the 1960s and continued to supply the engines for the Leopard 2 main battle tank. In 1966 MTU merged with Mercedes-Benz Motorenbau.

MTU Friedrichshafen remained a subsidiary of DaimlerChrysler until 2006 when it was sold to the EQT IV private equity fund, becoming a part of the Tognum Corporation.

Rolls-Royce Holdings and Daimler AG acquired Tognum in 2011. In 2014, Tognum was renamed Rolls-Royce Power Systems, having become a wholly owned subsidiary of Rolls-Royce Holdings.

The company manufactures diesel engines for trains, ships, oil and gas installations, military vehicles, agriculture, mining and construction equipment, as well as diesel generators and molten carbonate fuel cells.

== History ==
- 1909: Foundation of Luftfahrzeug-Motorenbau GmbH in Bissingen an der Enz as part of the Zeppelin corporation. The company manufactures engines for airships.
- 1912: 1911/12 relocation to Friedrichshafen; the name is changed to Motorenbau GmbH.
- 1918: Motorenbau GmbH is renamed Maybach-Motorenbau GmbH. After the end of the First World War the company began to manufacture car engines.
- 1966: Merger of the two companies Mercedes-Benz Motorenbau Friedrichshafen GmbH and Maybach-Motorenbau GmbH to form Maybach Mercedes-Benz Motorenbau GmbH.
- 1969: Maybach Mercedes-Benz Motorenbau GmbH is renamed Motoren und Turbinen-Union Friedrichshafen GmbH. The company is a subsidiary of MTU München GmbH which is owned at equal shares by Daimler-Benz AG and MAN AG until 1985.
- 1989: Incorporation of MTU Friedrichshafen in Deutsche Aero-space AG (DASA), a company of the Daimler-Benz Group.
- 1994: Cooperation of MTU Friedrichshafen with Detroit Diesel Corporation
- 1995: MTU Friedrichshafen and MTU München go their separate ways; MTU Friedrichshafen becomes a direct subsidiary of Daimler-Benz AG.
- 2001: MTU Motoren- und Turbinen-Union Friedrichshafen GmbH is renamed MTU Friedrichshafen GmbH.
- 2005: In late 2005, the DaimlerChrysler Off-Highway business unit, including MTU Friedrichshafen and the Off-Highway division of Detroit Diesel Corporation, is sold to the Swedish financial investor EQT AB.
- 2006: The business is transferred into the new holding company Tognum, with MTU Friedrichshafen as its core company.
- 2009: MTU Friedrichshafen celebrates its centenary. In the same year introduction of the new Series 1600, rounding off the performance range at the lower end of the product portfolio.
- 2011: Rolls-Royce Holdings and Daimler AG announced they were buying Tognum
- 2014: Tognum was renamed Rolls-Royce Power Systems
- 2014: From 26 August Rolls-Royce Power Systems became a 100 per cent subsidiary of Rolls-Royce Holdings

== Criticism ==
=== Gaza ===
MTU Friedrichshafen manufactures the MT-883 diesel engine used in Israel's Merkava Mk. 4 and Mk. 5 main battle tanks. Continued provision of engines, power-pack components and engineering support has made MTU part of the supply chain sustaining Israel's armoured forces during the Gaza genocide.

== Gallery ==
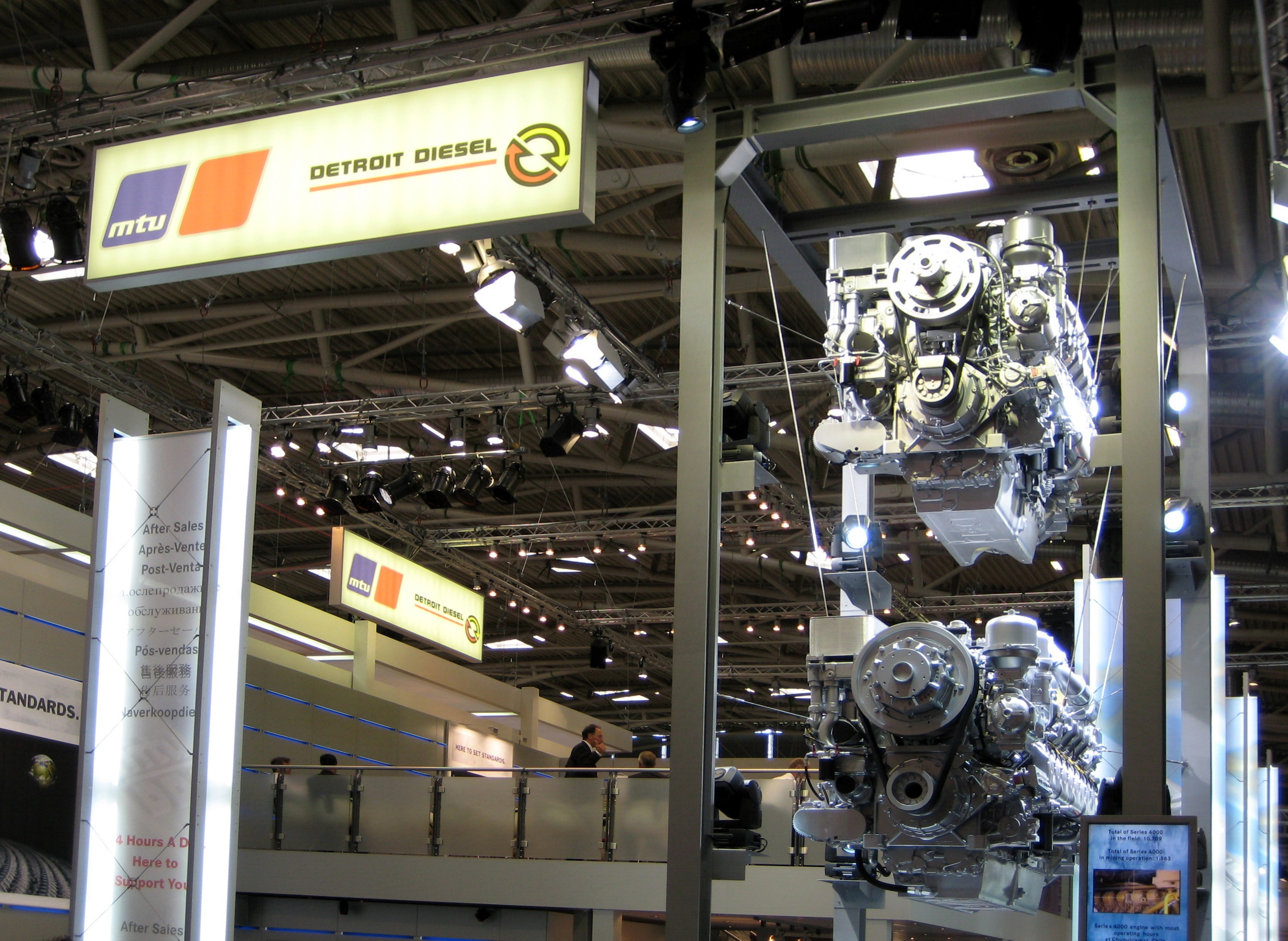
MTU / Detroit Diesel exhibition at a trade fair

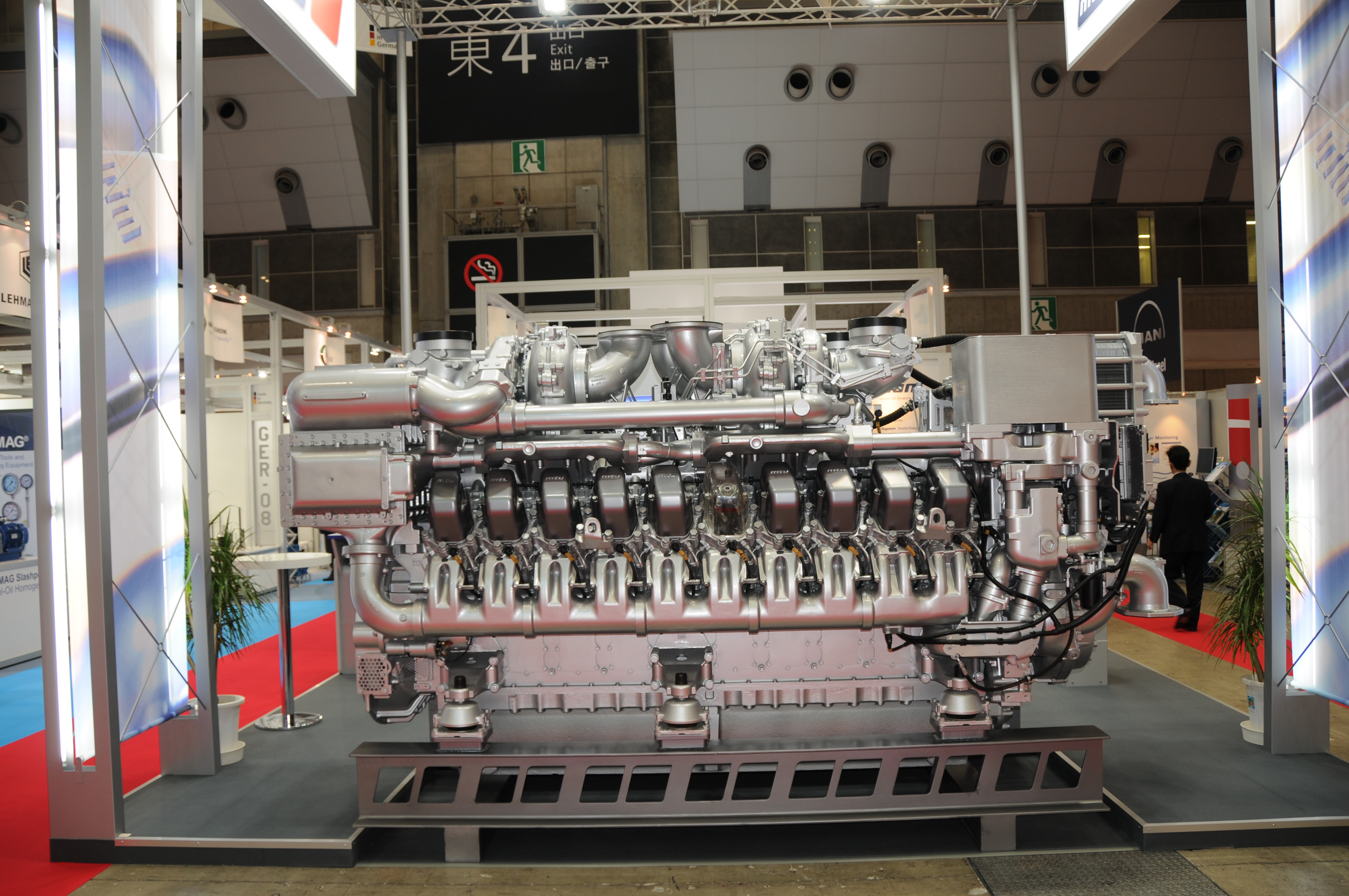
MTU 20V4000M93 engine

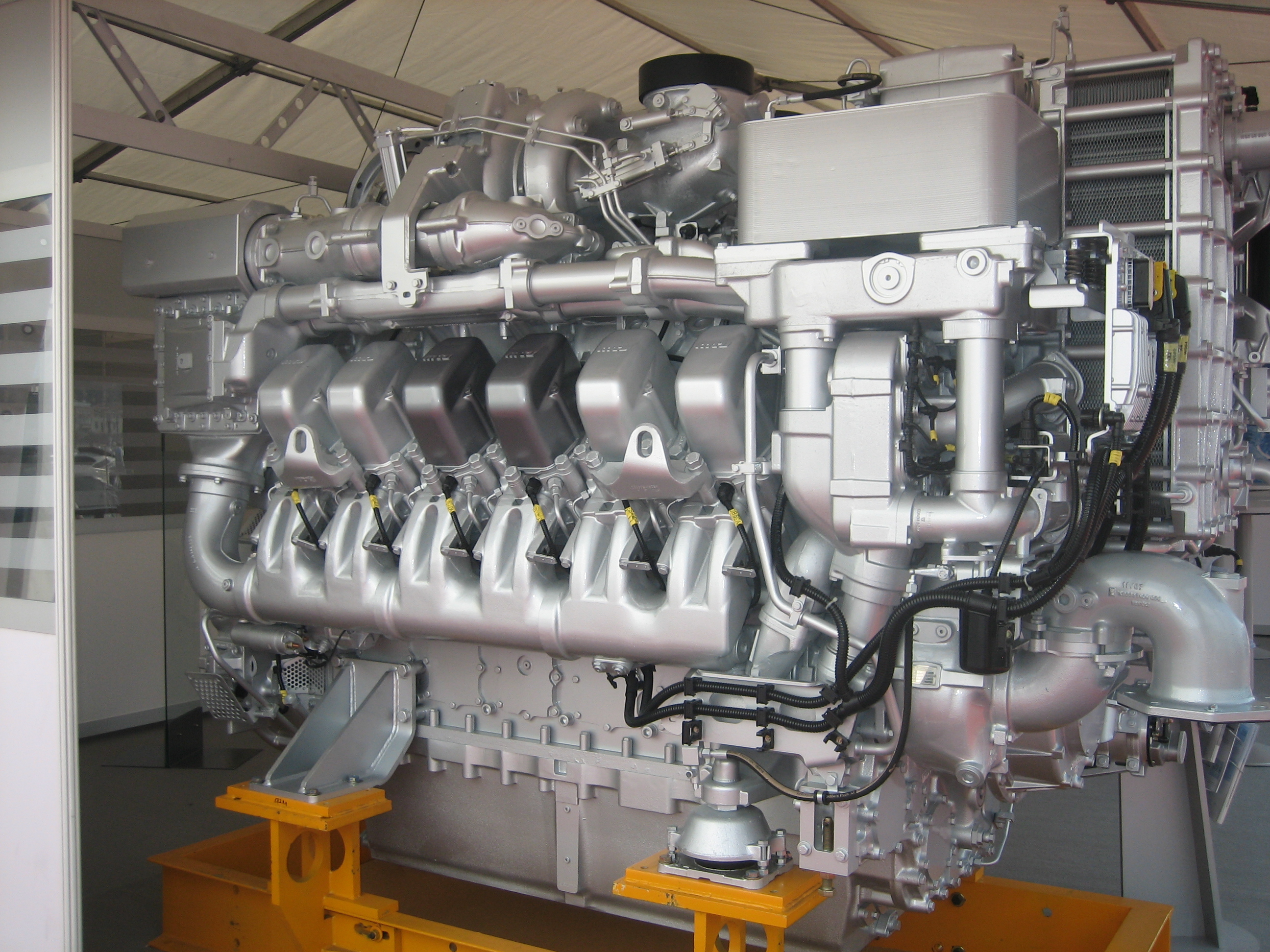
MTU marine engine

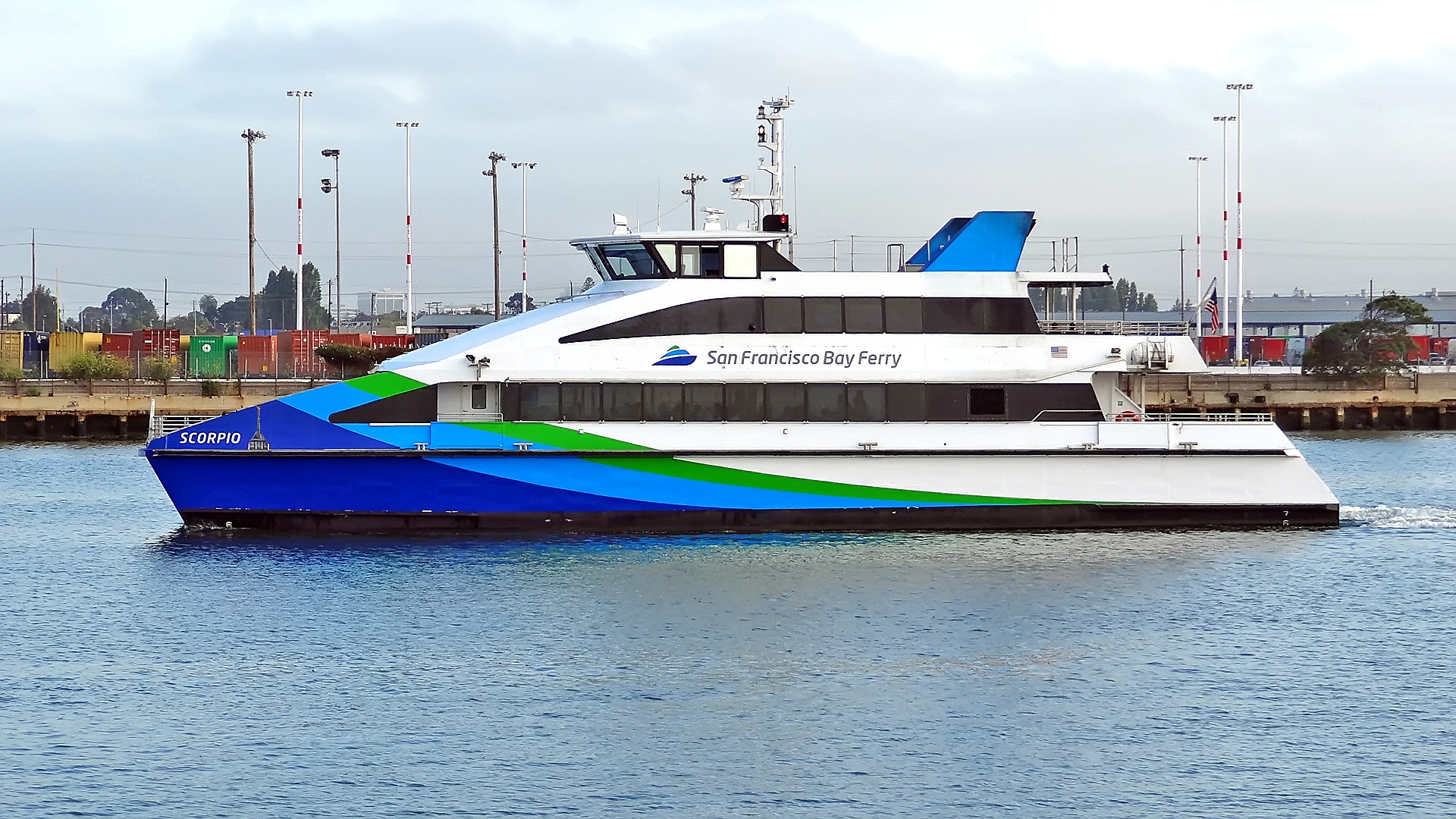
San Francisco Water Emergency Transportation Authority - Powered by custom emissions solution and MTU Series 4000 engines

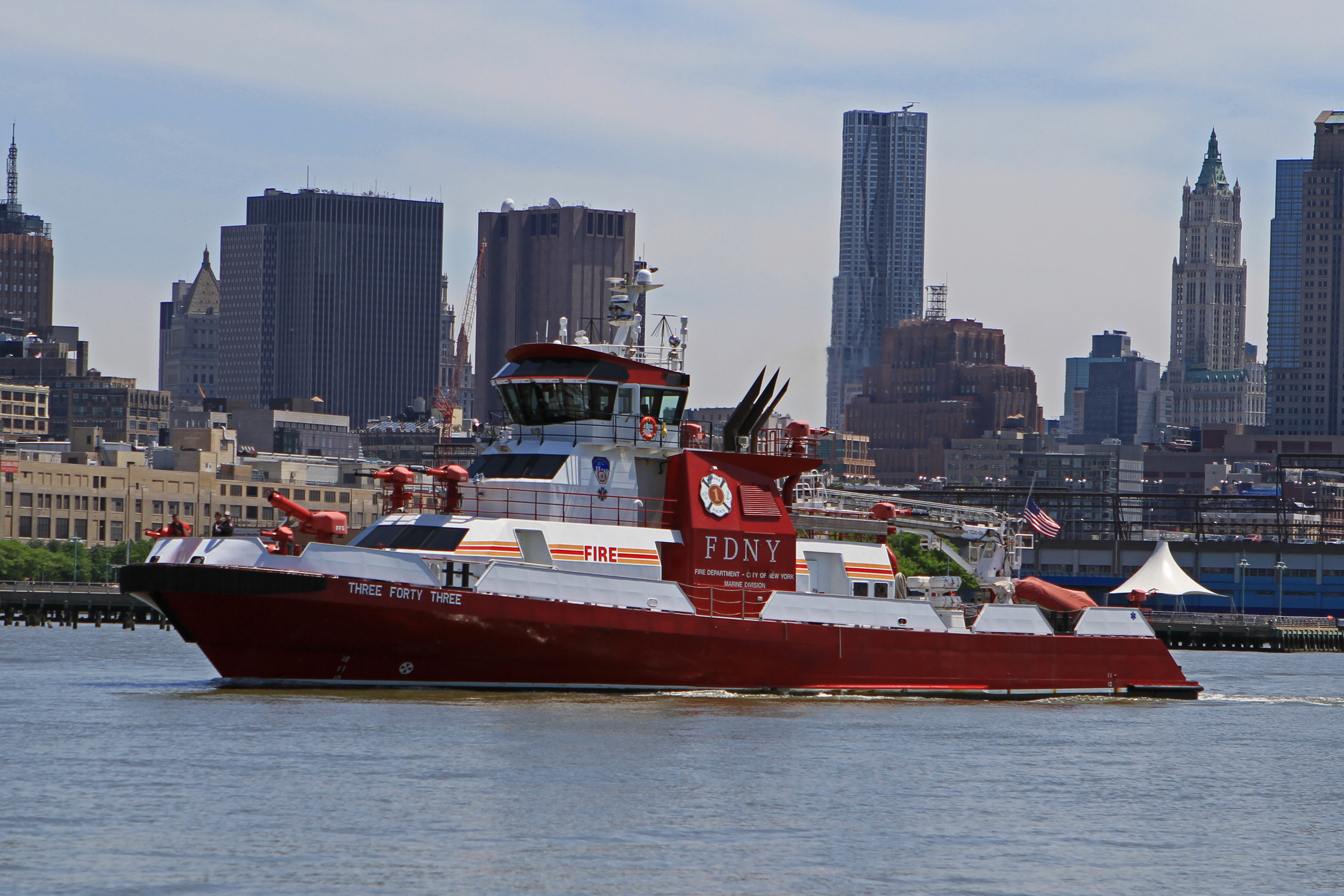
FDNY Fireboat Three Forty Three

== See also ==
- Bergen Marine
- Daimler AG
- Detroit Diesel
- List of WWII Maybach engines
- Maybach-Motorenbau GmbH
- MTU Aero Engines
- Rolls-Royce Holdings
- Rolls-Royce Power Systems
- Wilhelm Maybach
