= Bergen Engines =

Norwegian diesel and gas engine manufacturer

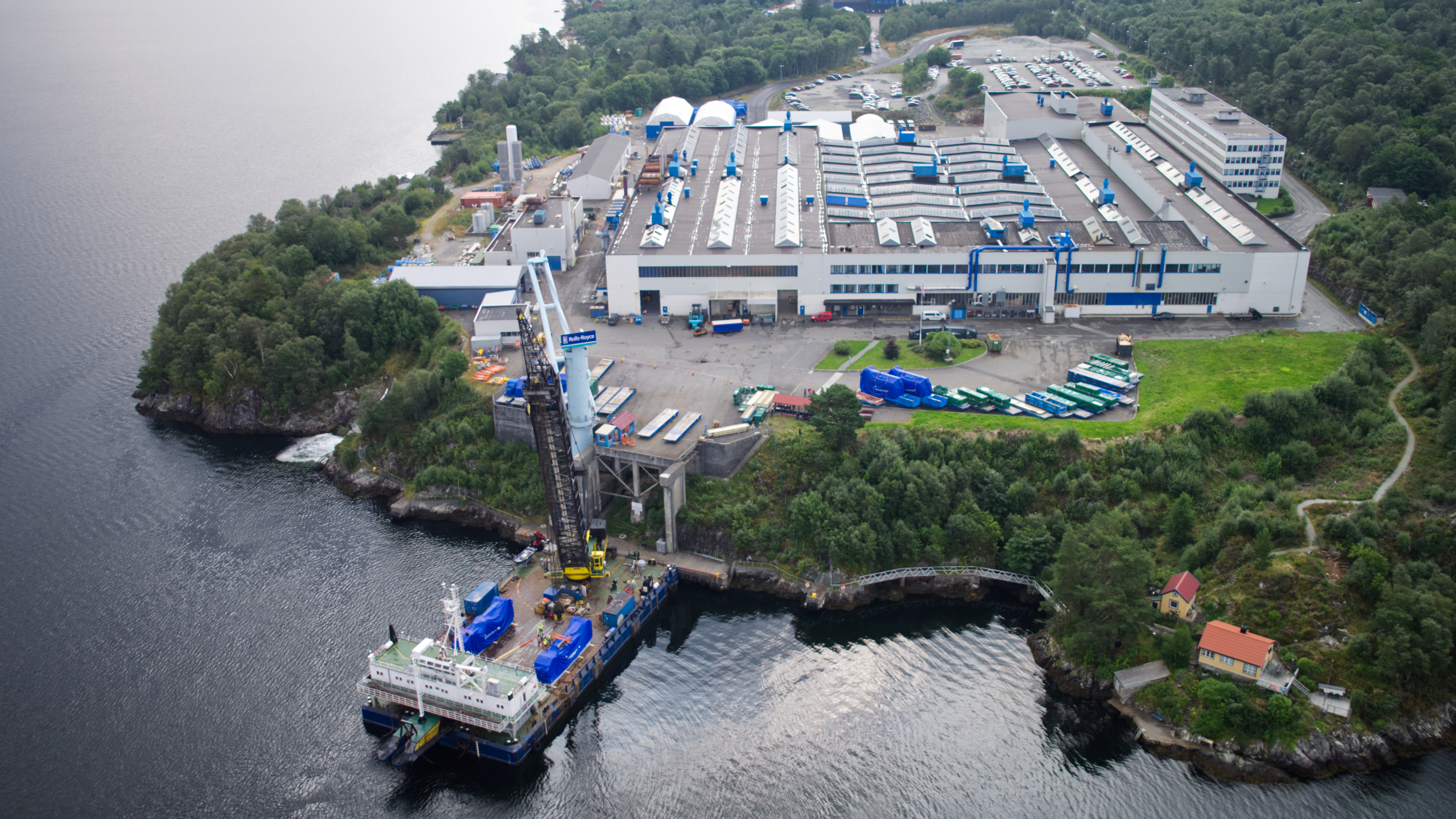
- Bergen Engines headquarter at Hordvikneset, Bergen
- Parent: Langley Holdings

Bergen Engines AS is a diesel and gas engine manufacturer based in Bergen, Norway.

On 31 December 2021, Langley Holdings completed the acquisition of Bergen Engines AS in Norway from Rolls-Royce PLC. The Bergen Engines group employs almost 950 people worldwide, of which more than 600 are based at its headquarters and production facilities near Bergen, in Norway. The Bergen Engines deal is expected to boost Langley group revenues by over $300 million in 2022 to around $1.5 billion.

The company's product line consists of various ranges of diesel and gas engines for the marine sector and land applications. Currently marketed engine platforms are the liquid fueled engines (diesel and heavy fuel oil) B32:40, the more modern B33:45 and the C25:33 and their gas fueled variants B35:40, B36:45 and C26:33, respectively. The power output of these engines range from 1.4 MW to 12 MW. Formerly part of Rolls-Royce Marine, it was merged into Tognum in July 2013, after Tognum had become a 50/50 joint venture between Rolls-Royce plc and Daimler AG.

== History ==
The company started as a shipbuilding business called Bergen Mekaniske Verksted (BMV) in 1855 in Bergen, Norway. The facility had a machine workshop, foundry, forge and dry dock, for building of ships and steam engines to propel them. In 1942 BMV established their diesel engine division, but due to World War II a design was not completed before 1946. Engines were delivered in 1946 and 1947 to the vessels MS Draupne and MS Arcturus. In 1984 the diesel engine division was spun off into its own company, BMV Maskin AS. It was acquired by Ulstein Group the following year and renamed Bergen Diesel AS.

In 1999 Ulstein Group was bought out by Vickers plc - Vickers was subsequently acquired by Rolls-Royce the same year. Rolls-Royce proceeded to rename every Ulstein subdivision to Rolls-Royce Marine, with Bergen Diesel being named Rolls-Royce Marine Engines - Bergen.

In March 2011 Rolls-Royce and Daimler launched a takeover for Tognum. The two companies announced on 24 June 2011 that their joint €3.4 billion tender offer had been successful, with 94% of Tognum shareholders accepting. In March 2014 Rolls-Royce announced a buyout of the Daimler share of Tognum, which would then be known as Rolls-Royce Power Systems.

=== Bergen Engines sale controversy ===
In February 2021, Rolls-Royce had announced an agreement to sell Bergen Engines to the Russian-linked company TMH International. The proposed transaction sparked political controversy in Norway due to concerns about national security, and the Norwegian government blocked the sale in March 2021 under the country's Security Act. Rolls-Royce subsequently sought a new buyer for the business.

In August 2021, Rolls-Royce entered into an agreement to sell the business to the British engineering and industrial group, Langley Holdings plc. The deal was finalized on 31 December 2021.

== Engine range ==
The Bergen engine ranges are denoted by the letters C, B and K and are broadly divided by the power output as follows:

- Bergen K (discontinued)
- Bergen C25:33 (liquid fueled), C26:33 (gas fueled)
- Bergen B32:40 (liquid fueled), B35:40 (gas fueled)
- Bergen B33:45 (liquid fueled), B36:45 (gas fueled)

for powers from 1,400 – 12,000 kW brake power.

These engines can all burn Marine Diesel Oil (MDO) and heavy fuel oil (HFO) and natural gas in gas configuration. Bergen Engines AS do not have any dual fuel engines.

They achieve specific fuel consumptions for liquid fuel between 183 and 196 g/kWh. Specific lubricant oil consumptions are of the order of 0.8 g/kWh for liquid fueled engine and 0.4 g/kWh for gas fueled engines.

== Bergen K-G4 (discontinued) ==
Also available as a gas engine for powers from 1190 – 3970 kW the Bergen K-G4 lean burn gas engine is the result of development based on the K type diesel and heavy fuel oil engine parent.

== Bergen B32:40 and 35:40 ==
The Bergen B Series is a twenty-year-old (est. 1986) marque of reciprocating diesel engines. They serve a wide range of ocean-going vessels and; can be supplied as propulsion units or as generator sets for the provision of electrical power. The range includes in-line and Vee cylinder configurations. The liquid fuel engine has a cylinder bore of 320 mm and a stroke of 400 mm. The gas fueled engine has a 350 mm bore with the same stroke.

The Bergen B Series Marine Diesels have power outputs in the range 2,880 - 8,000 kilowatts

These engines have a reputation for being "a Rolls-Royce product" in terms of quality which is ironic because when they were designed, the company was not part of the Rolls-Royce organization.

The Bergen B35:40 gas engine has high power and efficiency in the 720-750 rpm class and, is designed for low emissions of NO_{x}, CO, and UHC combined. It builds on the latest B diesel hardware, specifically redesigned and modified for the gas variant.
