= Glött (river) =

River in Germany

Location
- Country: Germany
- State: Bavaria

Physical characteristics
- Mouth
  - location: Danube
  - coordinates: 48.6169°N 10.6301°E
- Length: 35.0 km (21.7 mi)
- Basin size: 111 km^{2} (43 sq mi)

Basin features
- Progression: Danube→ Black Sea

Glött is a river of Bavaria, Germany. It flows into the Danube near Blindheim. The municipality Glött shares the name with the river as it flows near the town.

== See also ==
- List of rivers of Bavaria
