= Rolls-Royce Bergen C series =

The Bergen C liquid fuel series is a compact reciprocating internal combustion engine manufactured by Rolls-Royce plc.

== Design Duties ==
Capable of running on heavy fuel oil, it has been designed for genset (the prime mover in electrical generation applications) and marine propulsion duties for powers from 1440 to 2700 kW. The Bergen C liquid fuel series engines have 250mm bore 330mm stroke, running at 900/1000rpm or 720/750rpm. It is available in 6, 8 and 9 cylinder in-line versions.

Features and benefits:

- Power dense, 220/300 kW/cyl
- Brake Mean effective pressure 22.6 – 24.7bar
- Specific fuel consumption 182-186 g/kWh
- High availability, designed for long service intervals, condition based maintenance
- Cylinder unit replaced as a single unit

The Bergen C engine takes advantage of an advanced thermodynamic cycle, based on high compression ratio, optimised valve timing, high charge air pressure and late and fast combustion. This ensures good trade-off between fuel consumption, nitrous oxide (Nox) emissions and particulates.

== Dry Masses ==
The Bergen C engines have dry masses between 18000 and 25000 kg depending on the number of cylinders.
