= Chinese frigate Daqing =

Type 054A frigate of the PLA Navy

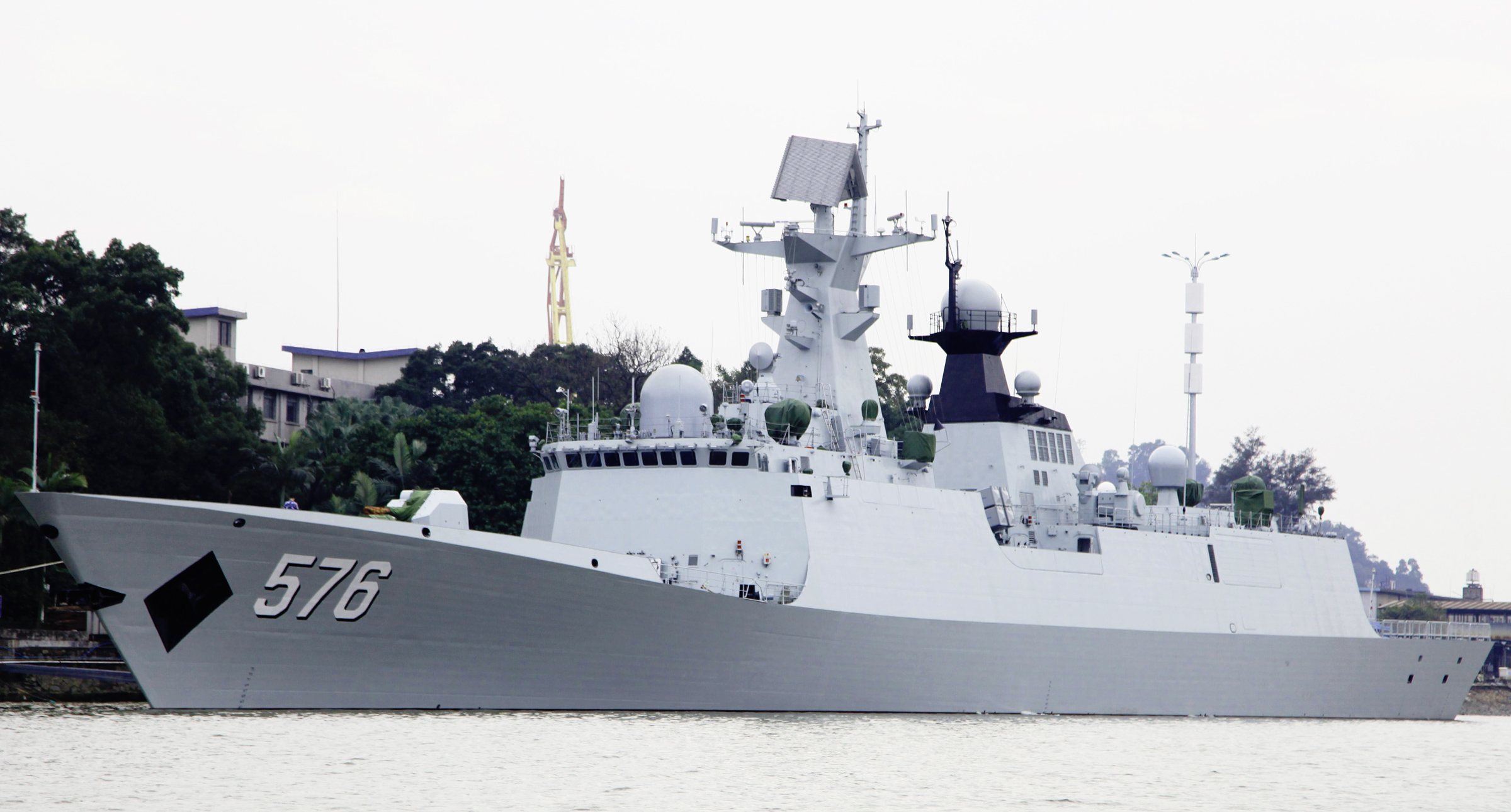
- Daqing on 4 January 2015

History

China
- Name: Daqing
- Namesake: Daqing; (大庆)
- Builder: Huangpu, Shanghai
- Launched: 8 October 2013
- Commissioned: 16 January 2015
- Identification: Pennant number: 576
- Status: Active

General characteristics
- Class & type: Type 054A frigate
- Displacement: 4,053 tonnes (full)
- Length: 134.1 m (440 ft)
- Beam: 16 m (52 ft)
- Propulsion: CODAD, 4 × Shaanxi 16 PA6 STC diesels, 5700 kW (7600+ hp @ 1084 rpm) each
- Speed: 27 knots (50 km/h) estimated
- Range: 8,025 nautical miles (9,235 mi; 14,862 km) estimated
- Complement: 165
- Sensors & processing systems: Type 382 Radar; Type 344 Radar (Mineral-ME Band Stand) OTH target acquisition and SSM fire control radar; 4 × Type 345 Radar (MR-90 Front Dome) SAM fire control radars; MR-36A surface search radar, I-band; Type 347G 76 mm gun fire control radar; 2 × Racal RM-1290 navigation radars, I-band; MGK-335 medium frequency active/passive sonar system; H/SJG-206 towed array sonar; ZKJ-4B/6 (developed from Thomson-CSF TAVITAC) combat data system; HN-900 Data link (Chinese equivalent of Link 11A/B, to be upgraded); SNTI-240 SATCOM; AKD5000S Ku band SATCOM
- Electronic warfare & decoys: Type 922-1 radar warning receiver; HZ-100 ECM & ELINT system; Kashtan-3 missile jamming system
- Armament: 1 × 32-cell VLS; HQ-16 SAM; Yu-8 anti submarine rocket launcher; 2 × 4 C-803 anti-ship / land attack cruise missiles; 1 × PJ26 76 mm dual-purpose gun; 2 × Type 730 7-barrel 30 mm CIWS guns or Type 1130; 2 × 3 324mm Yu-7 ASW torpedo launchers; 2 × 6 Type 87 240mm anti-submarine rocket launcher (36 rockets carried); 2 × Type 726-4 18-tube decoy rocket launchers
- Aircraft carried: 1 Kamov Ka-28 'Helix' or Harbin Z-9C
- Aviation facilities: hangar

Daqing (576) is a Type 054A frigate of the People's Liberation Army Navy. She was commissioned on 16 January 2015.

== Development and design ==
The Type 054A carries HQ-16 medium-range air defence missiles and anti-submarine missiles in a vertical launching system (VLS) system. The HQ-16 has a range of up to 50 km, with superior range and engagement angles to the Type 054's HQ-7. The Type 054A's VLS uses a hot launch method; a shared common exhaust system is sited between the two rows of rectangular launching tubes.

The four AK-630 close-in weapon systems (CIWS) of the Type 054 were replaced with two Type 730 CIWS on the Type 054A. The autonomous Type 730 provides improved reaction time against close-in threats.

== Construction and career ==
Daqing was launched on 8 October 2013 at the China State Shipbuilding Corporation in Shanghai. She was commissioned on 16 January 2015.

The frigate took part in the bilateral "Sea Guardian" exercise with the Pakistan Navy in 2026.

== Gallery ==
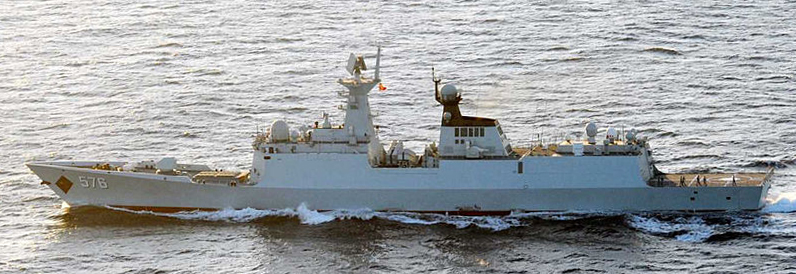
Daqing underway on 8 December 2015.

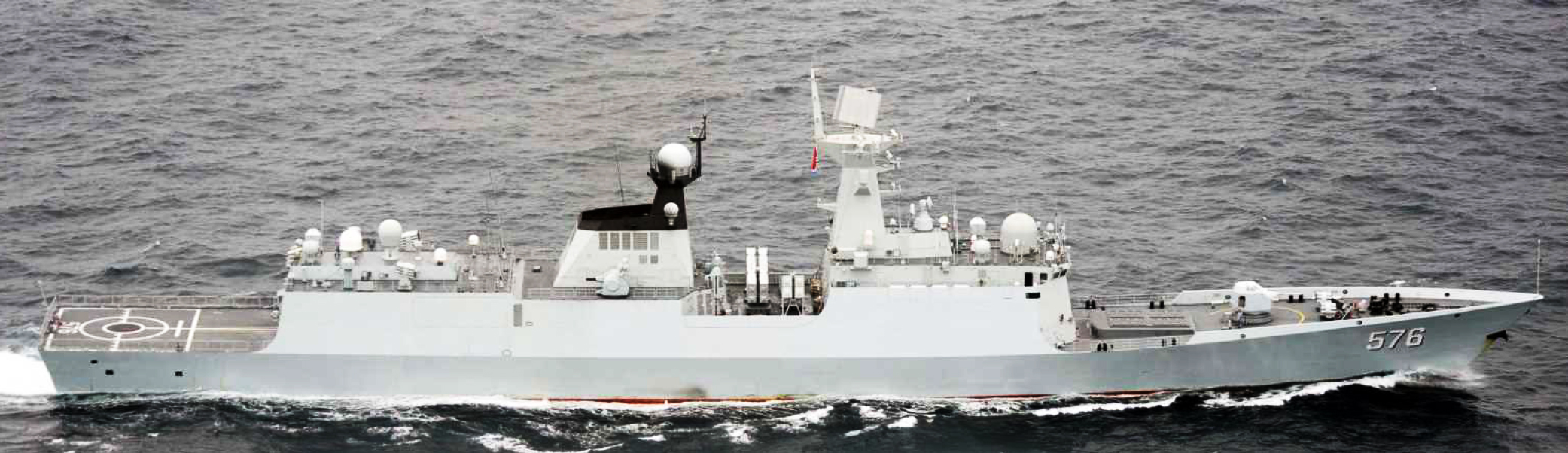
Daqing underway on 24 June 2016.

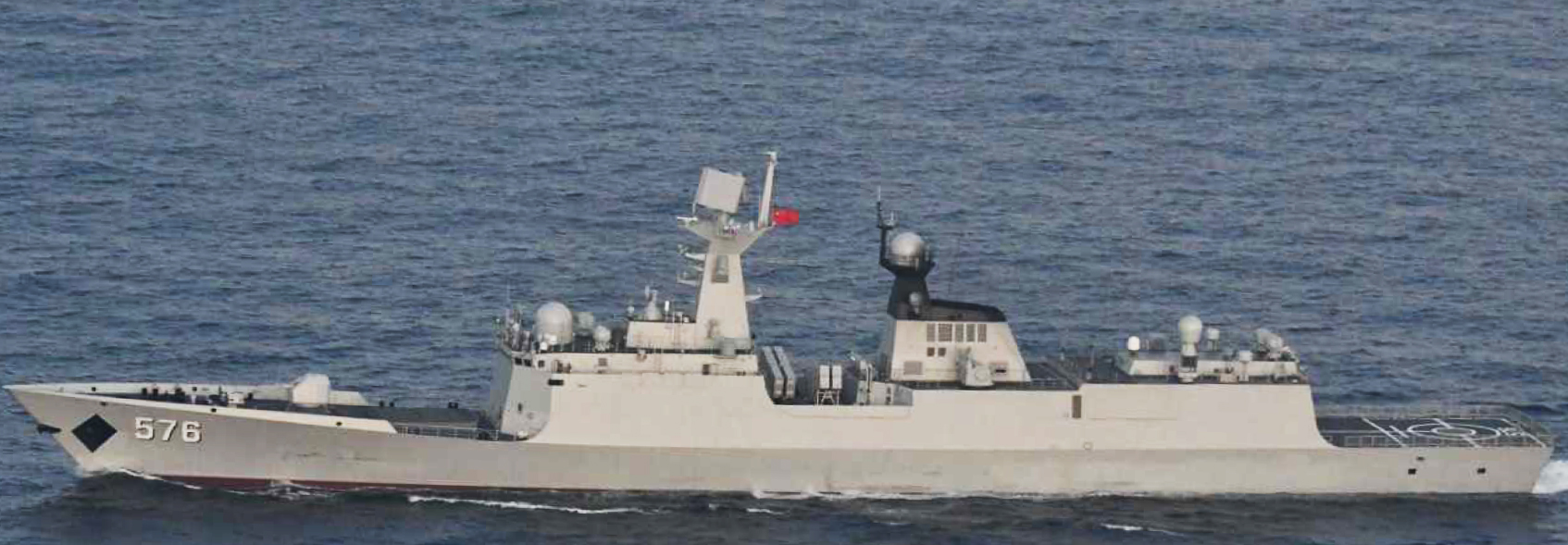
Daqing underway on 26 July 2019.

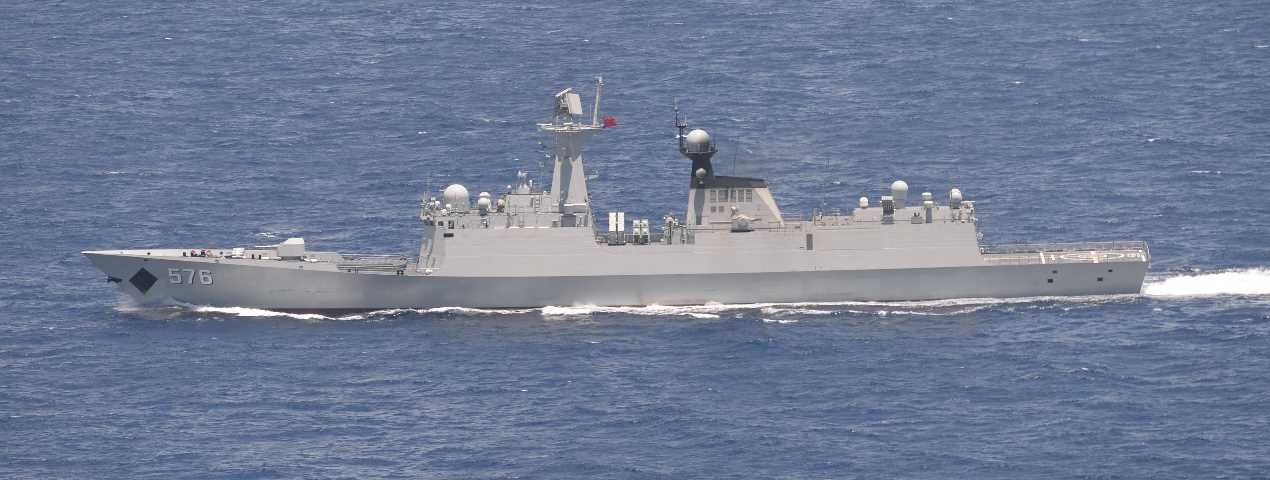
Daqing underway on 1 August 2019.
