= Chinese frigate Yangzhou =

Type 054A frigate of the PLA Navy

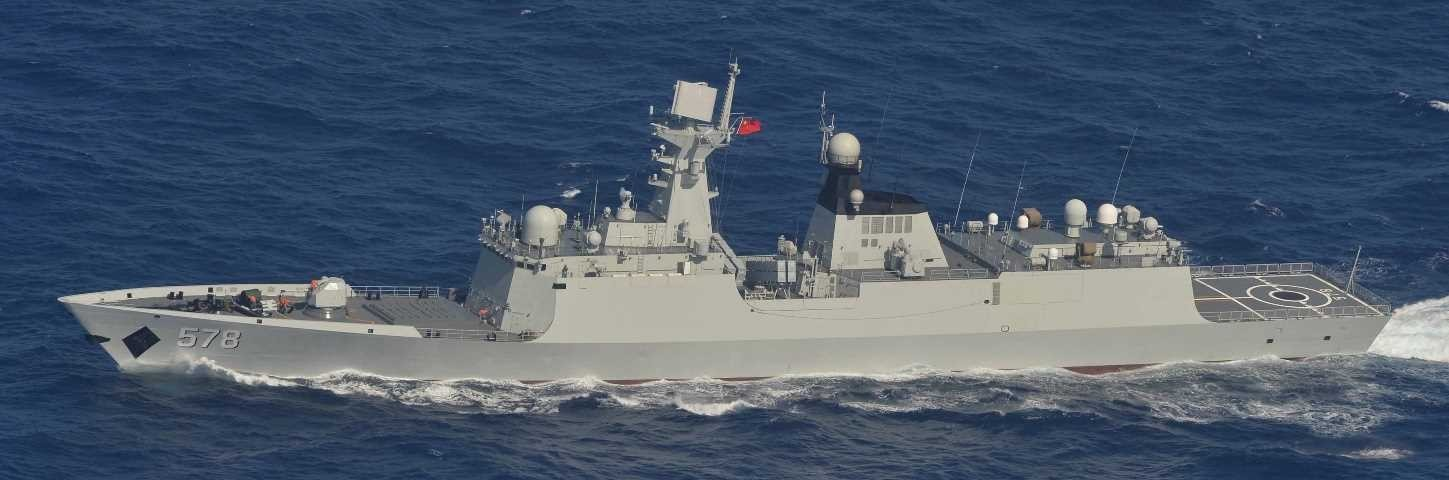
- Yangzhou underway on 17 May 2021

History

China
- Name: Yangzhou
- Namesake: Yangzhou; (扬州)
- Builder: Hudong–Zhonghua Shipbuilding, Shanghai
- Launched: 30 September 2013
- Commissioned: 21 September 2015
- Identification: Pennant number: 578
- Status: Active

General characteristics
- Class & type: Type 054A frigate
- Displacement: 4,053 tonnes (full)
- Length: 134.1 m (440 ft)
- Beam: 16 m (52 ft)
- Propulsion: CODAD, 4 × Shaanxi 16 PA6 STC diesels, 5700 kW (7600+ hp @ 1084 rpm) each
- Speed: 27 knots estimated
- Range: 8,025 nautical miles (9,235 mi; 14,862 km) estimated
- Complement: 165
- Sensors & processing systems: Type 382 Radar; Type 344 Radar (Mineral-ME Band Stand) OTH target acquisition and SSM fire control radar; 4 × Type 345 Radar(MR-90 Front Dome) SAM fire control radars; MR-36A surface search radar, I-band; Type 347G 76 mm gun fire control radar; 2 × Racal RM-1290 navigation radars, I-band; MGK-335 medium frequency active/passive sonar system; H/SJG-206 towed array sonar; ZKJ-4B/6 (developed from Thomson-CSF TAVITAC) combat data system; HN-900 Data link (Chinese equivalent of Link 11A/B, to be upgraded); SNTI-240 SATCOM; AKD5000S Ku band SATCOM
- Electronic warfare & decoys: Type 922-1 radar warning receiver; HZ-100 ECM & ELINT system; Kashtan-3 missile jamming system
- Armament: 1 × 32-cell VLS; HQ-16 SAM; Yu-8 anti submarine rocket launcher; 2 × 4 C-803 anti-ship / land attack cruise missiles; 1 × PJ26 76 mm dual-purpose gun; 2 × Type 730 7-barrel 30 mm CIWS guns or Type 1130; 2 × 3 324mm Yu-7 ASW torpedo launchers; 2 × 6 Type 87 240mm anti-submarine rocket launcher (36 rockets carried); 2 × Type 726-4 18-tube decoy rocket launchers
- Aircraft carried: 1 Kamov Ka-28 'Helix' or Harbin Z-9C
- Aviation facilities: hangar

Yangzhou (578) is a Type 054A frigate of the People's Liberation Army Navy. She was commissioned on 21 September 2015.

== Development and design ==
The Type 054A carries HQ-16 medium-range air defence missiles and anti-submarine missiles in a vertical launching system (VLS) system. The HQ-16 has a range of up to 50 km, with superior range and engagement angles to the Type 054's HQ-7. The Type 054A's VLS uses a hot launch method; a shared common exhaust system is sited between the two rows of rectangular launching tubes.

The four AK-630 close-in weapon systems (CIWS) of the Type 054 were replaced with two Type 730 CIWS on the Type 054A. The autonomous Type 730 provides improved reaction time against close-in threats.

== Construction and career ==
Yangzhou was launched on 30 September 2013 at the Hudong-Zhonghua Shipyard in Shanghai. She was commissioned on 21 September 2015. On 7 October 2017, she and sister ship Huanggang made a visit to London. On 11 December 2022, the ashes of the late Chinese leader Jiang Zemin were scattered into the sea from frigate Yangzhou, named after Jiang's birthplace.

== Gallery ==
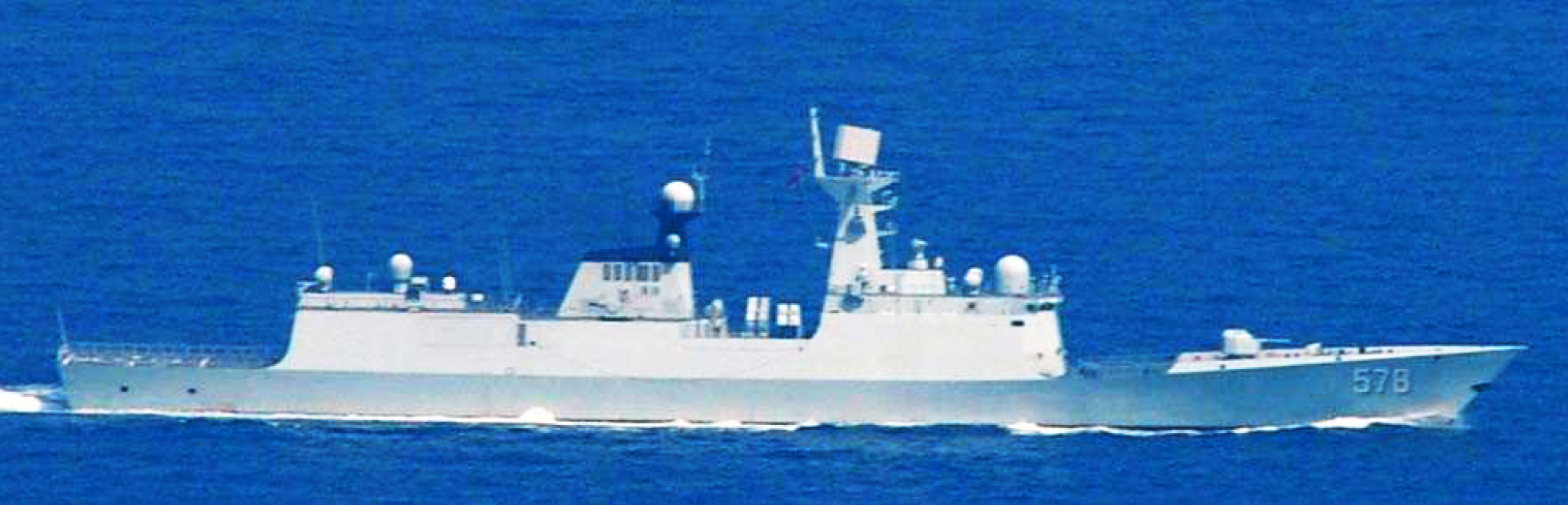
Yangzhou underway on 17 August 2016.

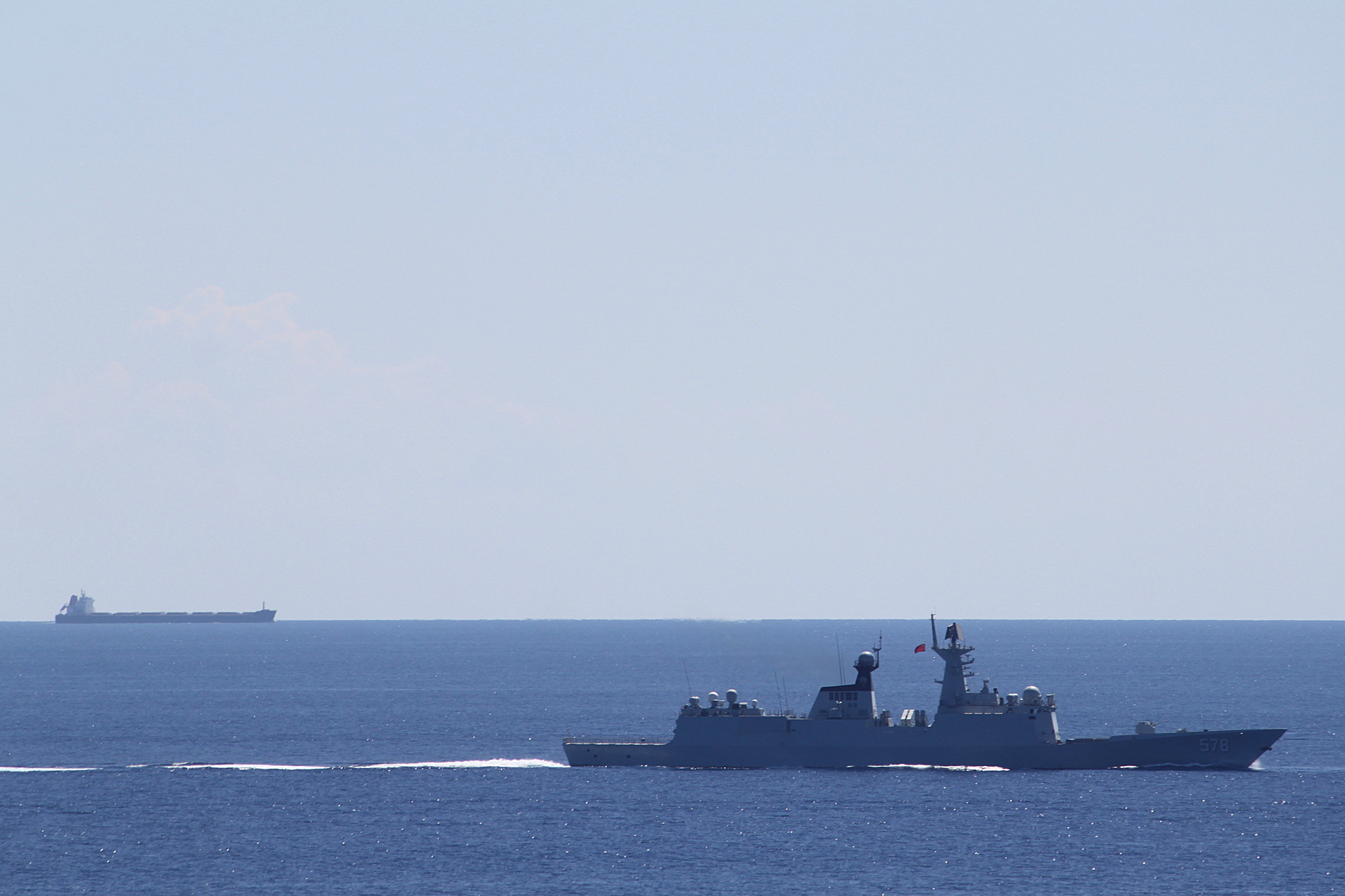
Yangzhou underway in the Mediterranean Sea on 6 September 2017.

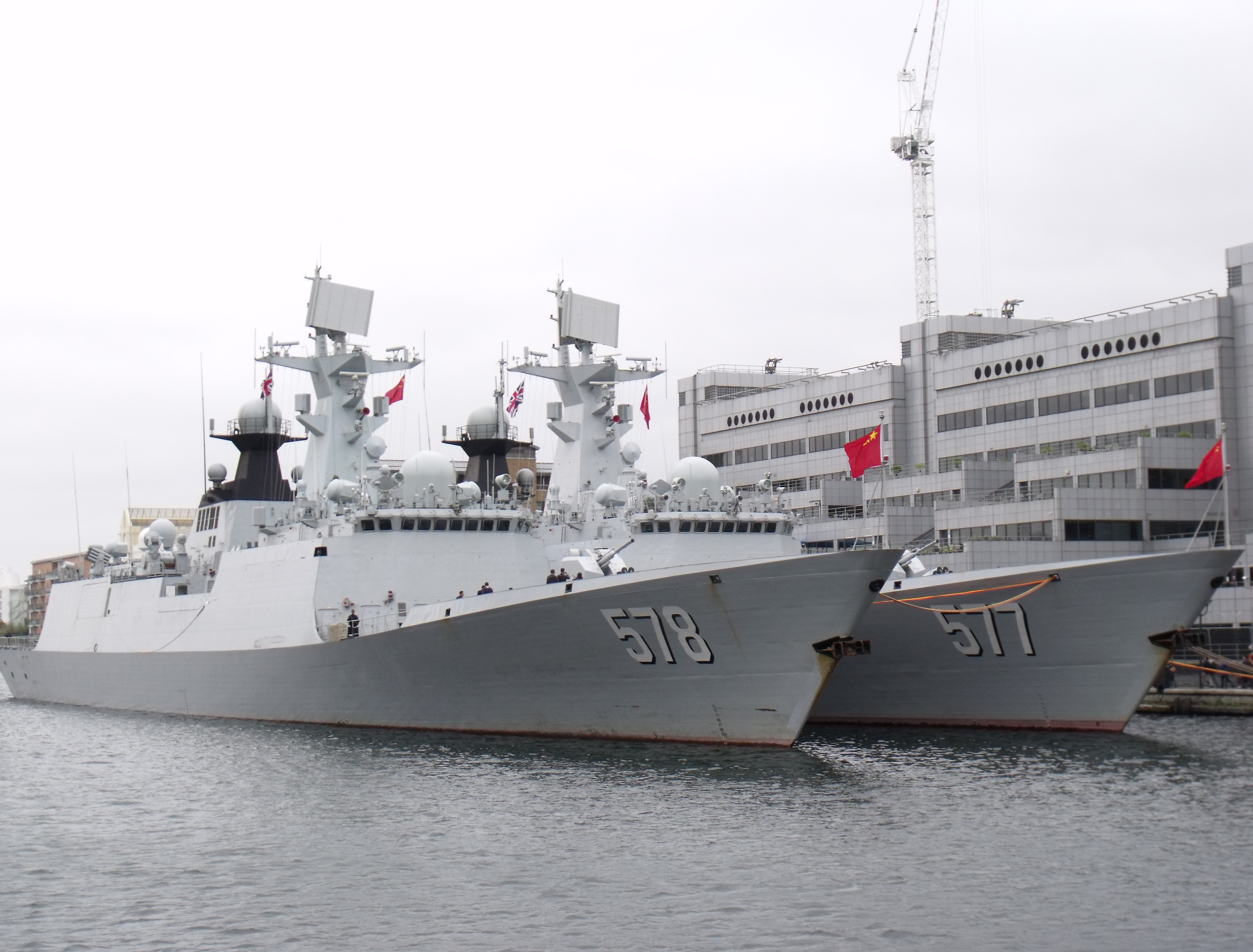
Yangzhou and Huanggang in London on 7 October 2017.

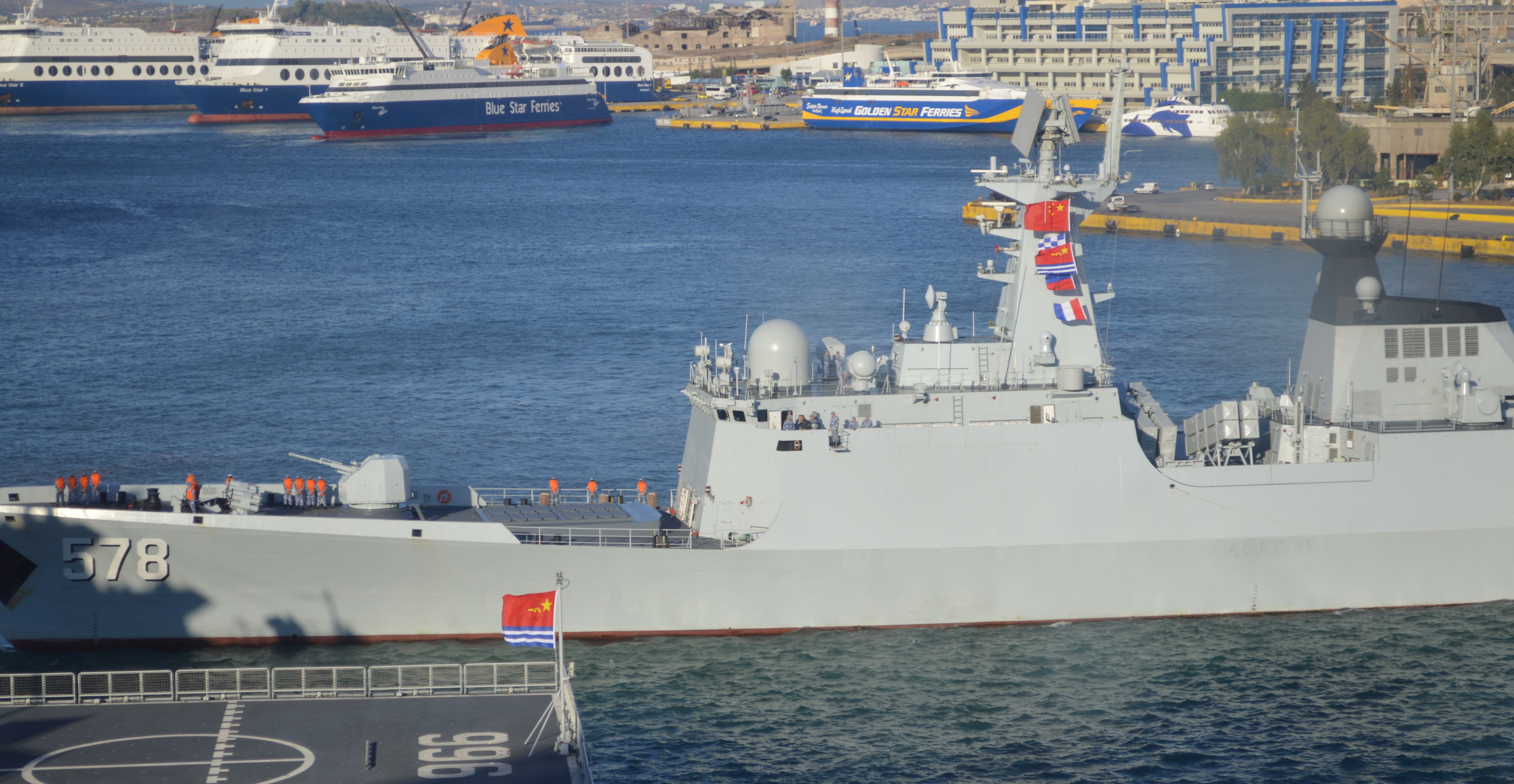
Yangzhou in Germany on 26 October 2017.

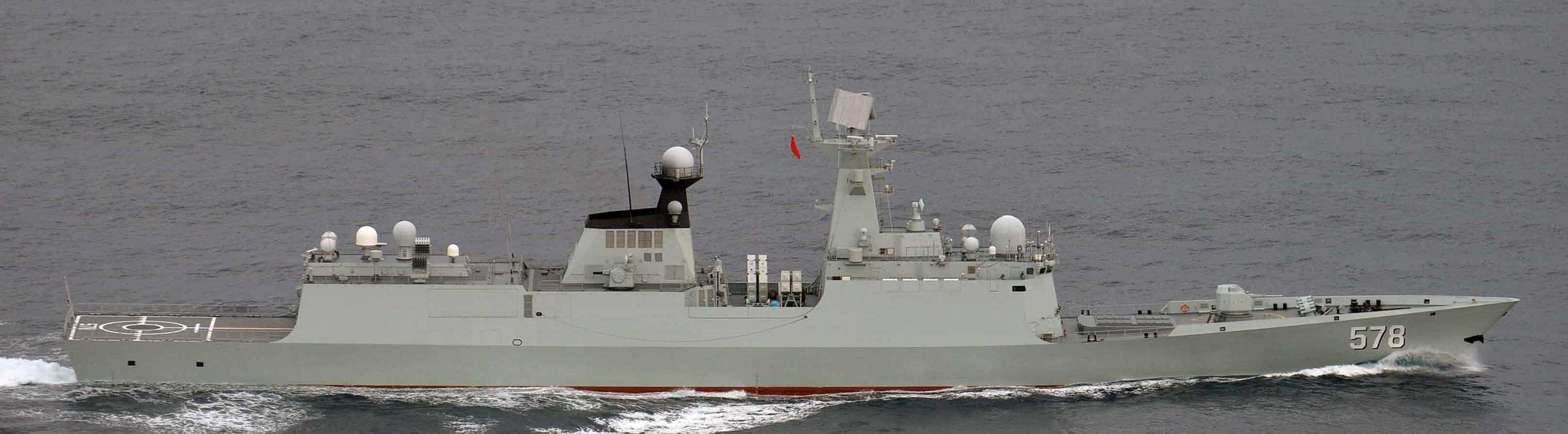
Yangzhou underway on 28 November 2019.
