= Chinese frigate Binzhou =

Type 054A frigate of the PLA Navy

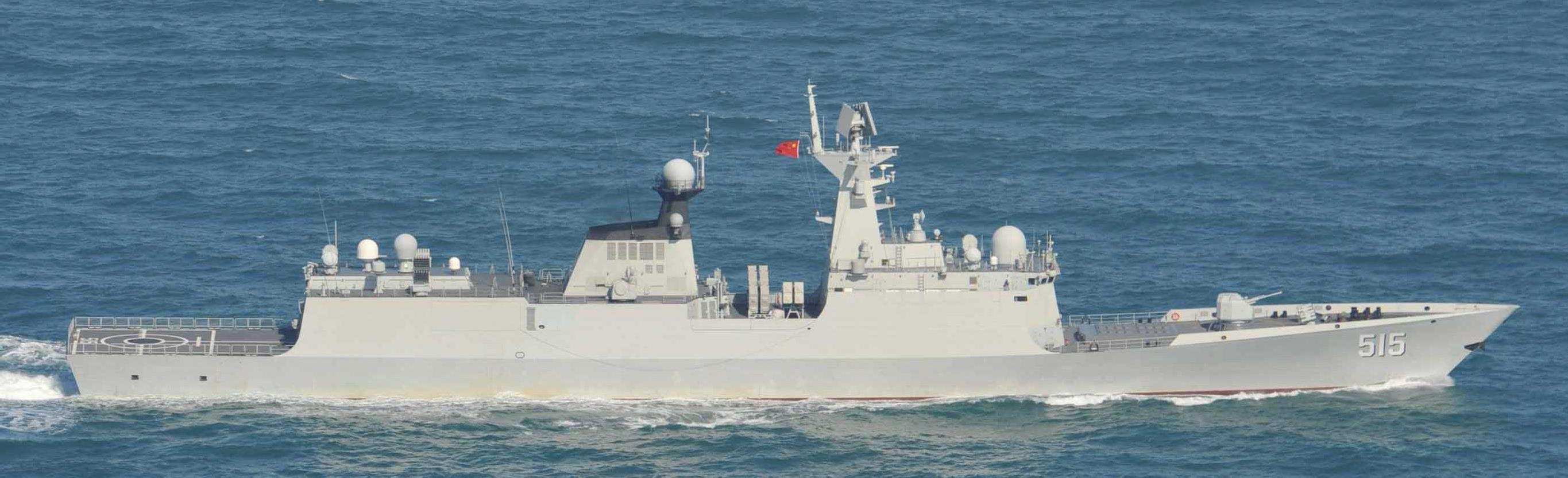
- Binzhou underway on 26 March 2020

History

China
- Name: Binzhou
- Namesake: Binzhou; (滨州)
- Builder: Hudong–Zhonghua Shipbuilding, Shanghai
- Launched: 13 December 2015
- Commissioned: 29 December 2016
- Home port: Zhoushan, Zhejiang
- Identification: Pennant number: 515
- Motto: 勇武至诚，精武制胜 (Be brave and sincere, elitely achieve victory)
- Status: Active
- Badge

General characteristics
- Class & type: Type 054A frigate
- Displacement: 4,053 tonnes (full)
- Length: 134.1 m (440 ft)
- Beam: 16 m (52 ft)
- Propulsion: CODAD, 4 × Shaanxi 16 PA6 STC diesels, 5700 kW (7600+ hp @ 1084 rpm) each
- Speed: 27 knots (50 km/h) estimated
- Range: 8,025 nautical miles (9,235 mi; 14,862 km) estimated
- Complement: 165
- Sensors & processing systems: Type 382 Radar; Type 344 Radar (Mineral-ME Band Stand) OTH target acquisition and SSM fire control radar; 4 × Type 345 Radar(MR-90 Front Dome) SAM fire control radars; MR-36A surface search radar, I-band; Type 347G 76 mm gun fire control radar; 2 × Racal RM-1290 navigation radars, I-band; MGK-335 medium frequency active/passive sonar system; H/SJG-206 towed array sonar; ZKJ-4B/6 (developed from Thomson-CSF TAVITAC) combat data system; HN-900 Data link (Chinese equivalent of Link 11A/B, to be upgraded); SNTI-240 SATCOM; AKD5000S Ku band SATCOM
- Electronic warfare & decoys: Type 922-1 radar warning receiver; HZ-100 ECM & ELINT system; Kashtan-3 missile jamming system
- Armament: 1 × 32-cell VLS; HQ-16 SAM; Yu-8 anti submarine rocket launcher; 2 × 4 C-803 anti-ship / land attack cruise missiles; 1 × PJ26 76 mm dual-purpose gun; 2 × Type 730 7-barrel 30 mm CIWS guns or Type 1130; 2 × 3 324mm Yu-7 ASW torpedo launchers; 2 × 6 Type 87 240mm anti-submarine rocket launcher (36 rockets carried); 2 × Type 726-4 18-tube decoy rocket launchers
- Aircraft carried: 1 Kamov Ka-28 'Helix' or Harbin Z-9C
- Aviation facilities: hangar

Binzhou (515) is a Type 054A frigate of the People's Liberation Army Navy. She was commissioned on 29 December 2016. She is stationed in Zhoushan, Zhejiang. She is part of the East Sea Fleet.

== Development and design ==
The Type 054A carries HQ-16 medium-range air defence missiles and anti-submarine missiles in a vertical launching system (VLS) system. The HQ-16 has a range of up to 50 km, with superior range and engagement angles to the Type 054's HQ-7. The Type 054A's VLS uses a hot launch method; a shared common exhaust system is sited between the two rows of rectangular launching tubes.

The four AK-630 close-in weapon systems (CIWS) of the Type 054 were replaced with two Type 730 CIWS on the Type 054A. The autonomous Type 730 provides improved reaction time against close-in threats.

== Construction and career ==
Binzhou was launched on 13 December 2015 at the Hudong-Zhonghua Shipyard in Shanghai. She was commissioned on 29 December 2016.

She was part of the 29th Escort Task Group in the Gulf of Aden, being deployed on April 4, 2018, and had a stopover in the Port of Piraeus, where she was visited by the then Chinese ambassador to Greece Zou Xiaoli on June 1.

== Gallery ==
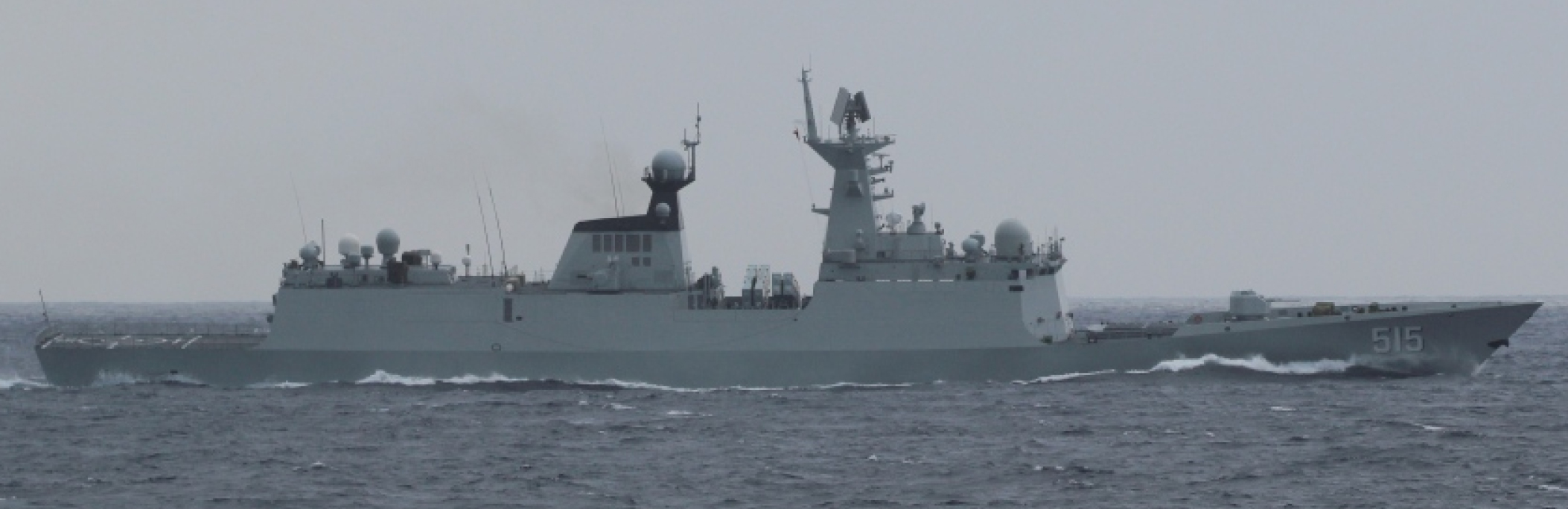
Binzhou underway on 5 April 2018.

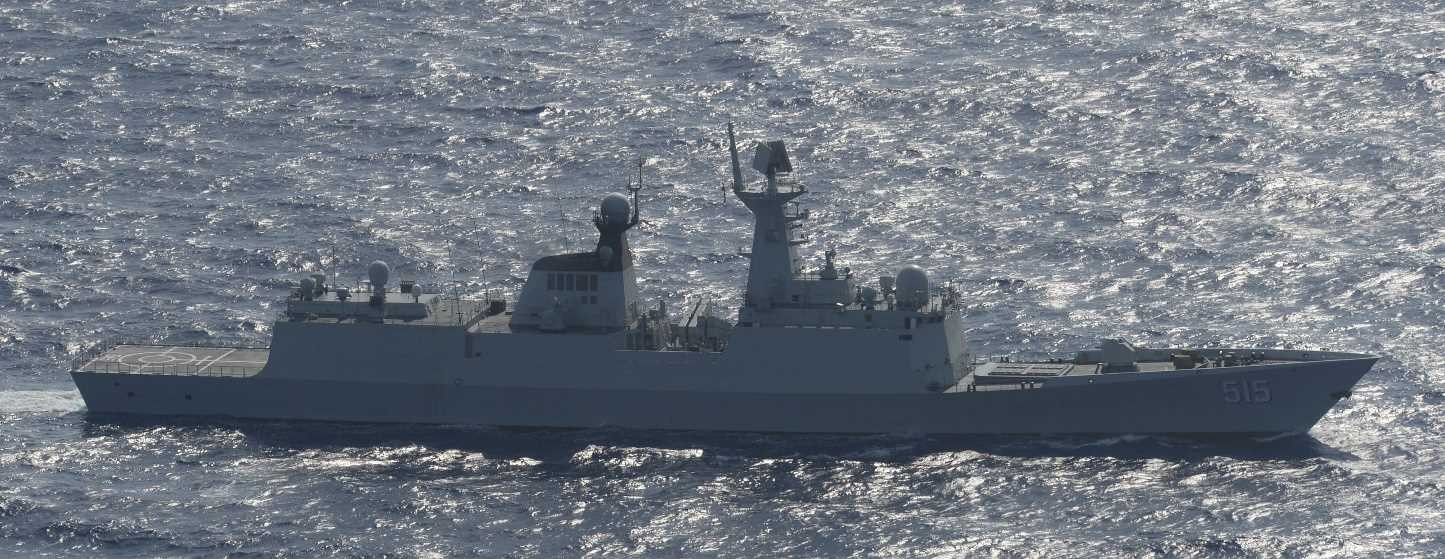
Binzhou underway on 30 May 2019.
