= Chinese frigate Xiangtan =

A number of vessels of the People's Liberation Army Navy have borne the name Xiangtan, after the city Xiangtan.

- Chinese frigate Xiangtan (556), a Type 053H1 frigate. Transferred to the Bangladesh Navy in 1989 and renamed BNS Osman.
- Chinese frigate Xiangtan (531), a Type 054A frigate, in service since 2016.
