= Type 054A frigate =

Class of Chinese guided-missile frigates

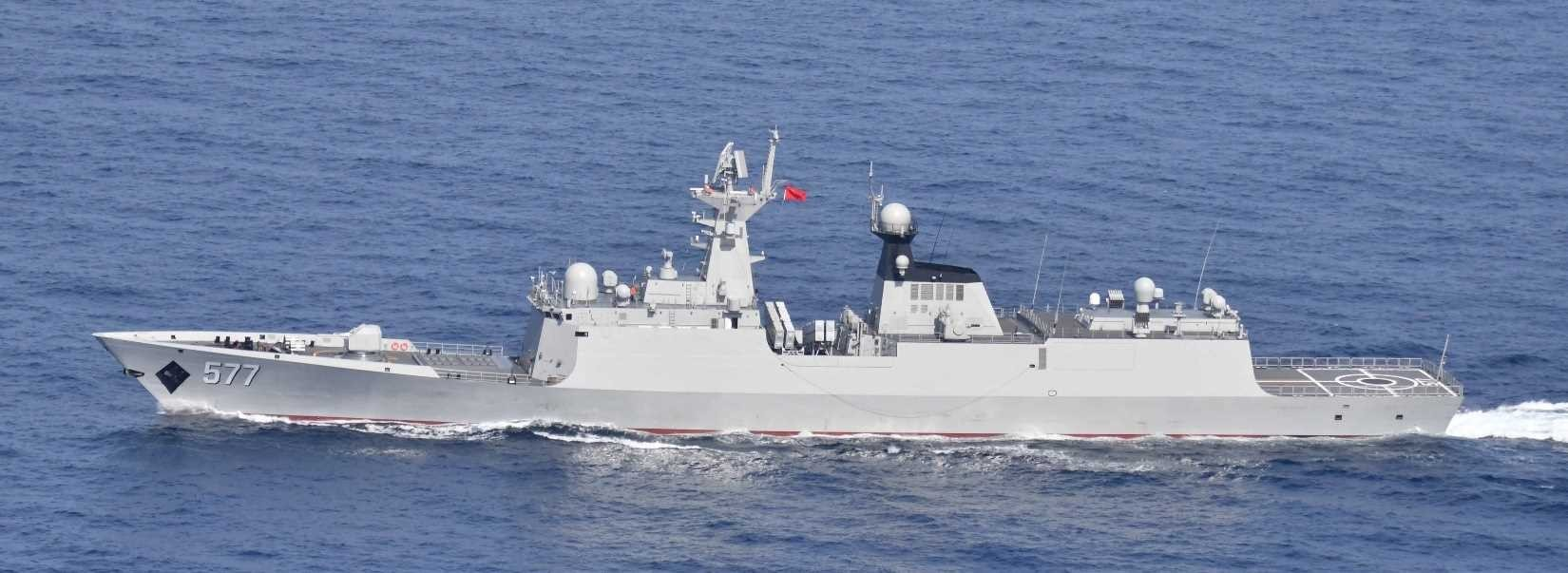
- Huanggang (577) in 2020

Class overview
- Builders: Hudong-Zhonghua Shipyard; Huangpu Shipyard
- Operators: People's Liberation Army Navy; China Coast Guard; Pakistan Navy
- Preceded by: Type 054 frigate
- Succeeded by: Type 054B frigate
- Subclasses: Tughril class (Pakistan) Type 818 Cutter (China Coast Guard)
- Cost: US$348 million (est. 2015)
- Built: 2005–present
- In commission: 2008–present
- Planned: 50
- Active: 46

General characteristics
- Type: Frigate
- Displacement: 3,963 tonnes (full)
- Length: 134 m (440 ft)
- Beam: 16 m (52 ft)
- Draught: 5 m (16 ft)
- Propulsion: CODAD, 4 × SEMT Pielstick 16 PA 6V 280 STC diesels, 20.7 MW (28,200 hp) total, 2 shafts
- Speed: 27 knots (50 km/h)
- Range: 3,800 nautical miles (4,400 mi; 7,000 km) estimated at 18 kn (33 km/h; 21 mph)
- Sensors & processing systems: Type 382 Radar; Type 344 Radar (Mineral-ME Band Stand) target acquisition and SSM fire control radar; 4 × MR-90 Front Dome SAM fire control radars; MR-36A surface search radar, I-band; Type 347G 76 mm gun fire control radar; 2 × Racal RM-1290 navigation radars, I-band; MGK-335 medium frequency active/passive sonar system; H/SJG-206 towed array sonar; ZKJ-4B/6 (developed from Thomson-CSF TAVITAC) combat data system; HN-900 Data link (Chinese equivalent of Link 11A/B, to be upgraded); SNTI-240 SATCOM; AKD5000S Ku band SATCOM
- Electronic warfare & decoys: 2 × Type 726-4 18-tube decoy rocket launchers; Type 922-1 radar warning receiver; HZ-100 ECM & ELINT system; Kashtan-3 missile jamming system
- Armament: 1 × 32-cell H/AKJ-16 VLS; HHQ-16 SAM; Yu-8 anti-submarine missile; 2 × 4 YJ-83 anti-ship missiles; 1 × H/PJ-26 76 mm naval gun (Type 054A and Type 054A+) or 1 x H/PJ-87 100 mm naval gun (Type 054AG); 2 × 30 mm Type 730 7-barrel gun-based CIWS or Type 1130 11-barrel gun-based CIWS; 2 × 3 324 mm Yu-7 torpedo launchers; 2 × 6 Type 87 240mm anti-submarine rocket launcher
- Aircraft carried: Type 054A: Harbin Z-9C or Kamov Ka-28 'Helix'; Type 054AG: Harbin Z-20 family helicopter including Z-20F anti-submarine version and the Z-20J naval utility version
- Aviation facilities: hangar

The Type 054A (NATO/OSD Jiangkai II) is a class of guided-missile frigate from the People's Republic of China. It is a development of the Type 054 frigate; compared to its predecessor, the Type 054A has medium-range air defense capability in the form of Type 382 radar and vertically launched (VLS) HHQ-16 surface-to-air missiles.

The first ship (Xuzhou) of the new Type 054A was laid down in 2005 and entered service with the People's Liberation Army Navy (PLAN) in January 2008; the class was a key component of the PLAN's surface fleet by the late 2010s. Production was ongoing in 2023, with 30 ships in service by mid 2019, while the next batch of 10 ships commissioned from 2022 onwards, and a final batch of 10 ships to a new Type 054AG variant are currently being introduced into service from 2024, although this last batch was interrupted by two units being built to the follow-on (and larger) Type 054B frigate design.

== Design ==
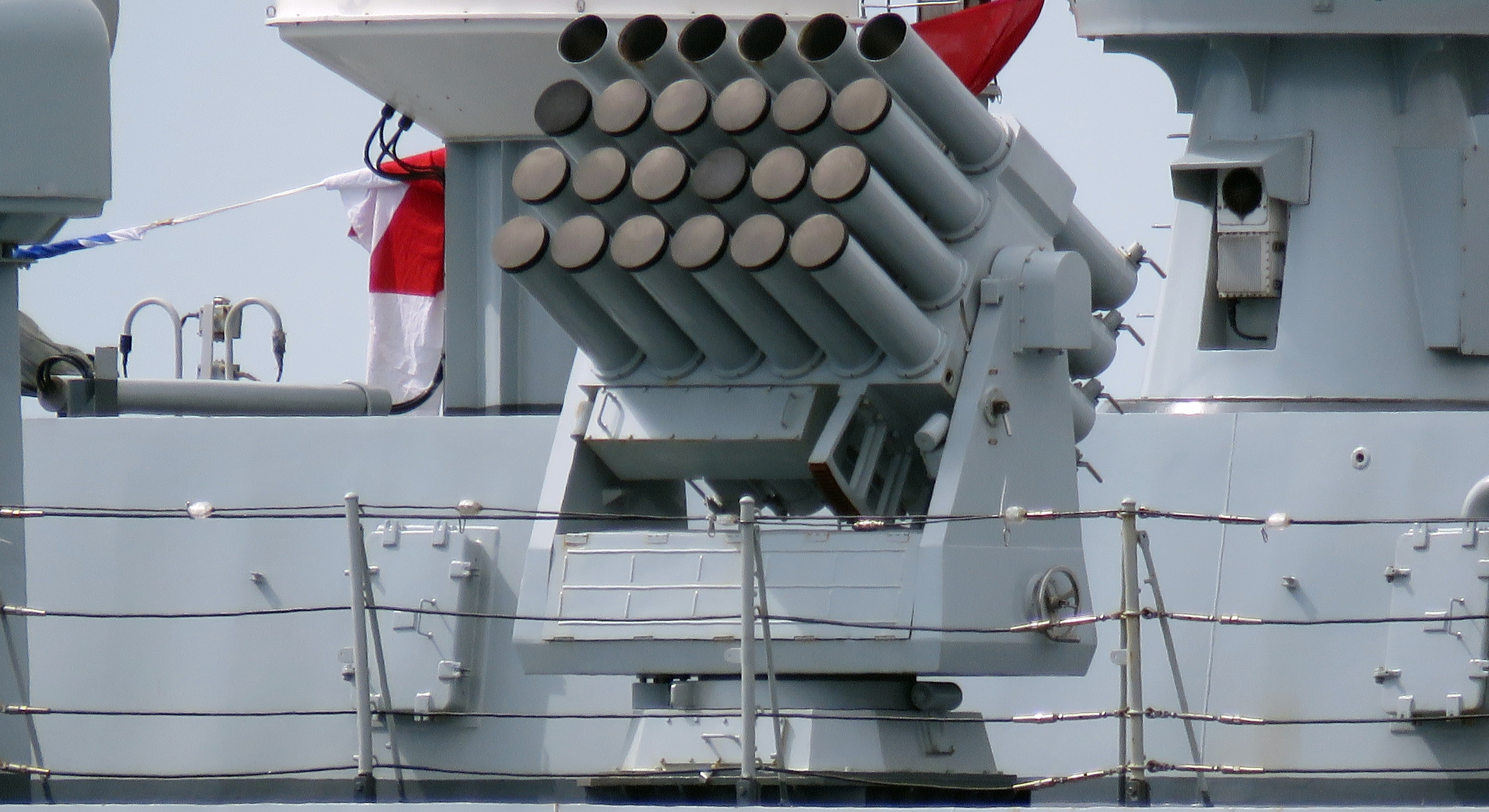
Type 726-4 decoy launchers of the Type 054A frigate Handan (579)

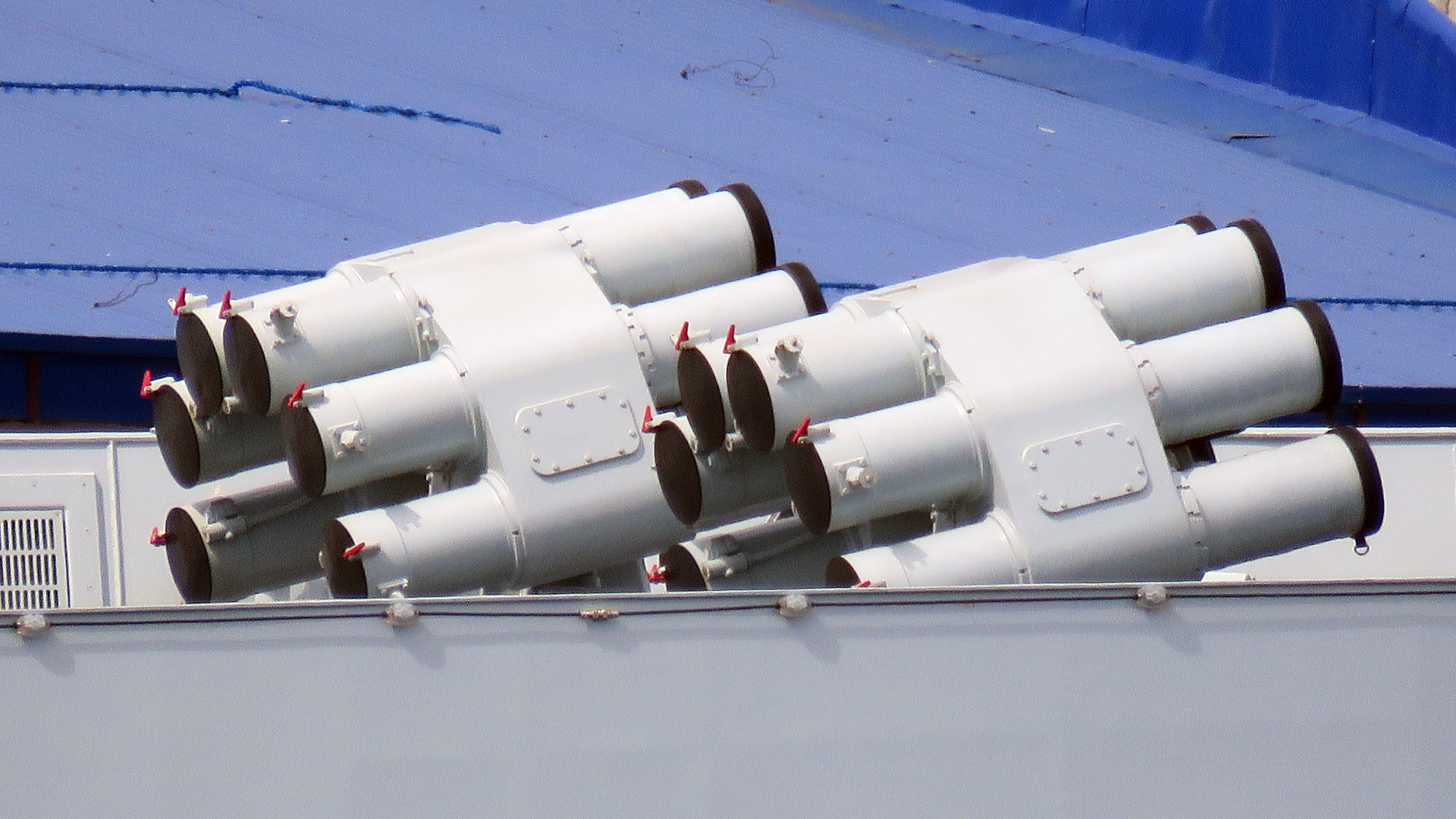
The Type 87 Anti Submarine Rocket (ASROC) Launchers of the Type 054A frigate Wuhu (539)

The Type 054 was heavily influenced by the La Fayette-class frigate from France, and so reflected the strategic and operational requirements of that country. The development of the Type 054A may have been driven by China's need to address high-intensity armed conflict.

The Type 054A uses the same stealthy hull form as the Type 054. The forward launcher for HQ-7 short-range SAM is replaced with a 32-cell vertical launching system for medium-range HHQ-16 SAMs and Yu-8 antisubmarine rockets. The smaller main gun and Type 730 close-in weapon system (CIWS) are also installed.

The radar suite makes use of technology reverse engineered from Russian systems; the affected Chinese systems may include the H/LJQ-382 air search radar (from the Fregat MAE-3) and the H/LJQ-366 fire control radar (from the Mineral ME). The HHQ-16 target illuminators may also be derived from the Russian MR-90.

Ships starting with the 17th unit (Huanggang) were constructed with enhanced anti-submarine warfare capability - adding variable depth and towed array sonar - and the Type 1130 CIWS instead of the Type 730. These ships have been unofficially referred to as Type 054A+, Type 054A2, or modified Jiangkai II.

In 2015, Gabe Collins estimated that each ship cost US$348 million.

== Operational history ==
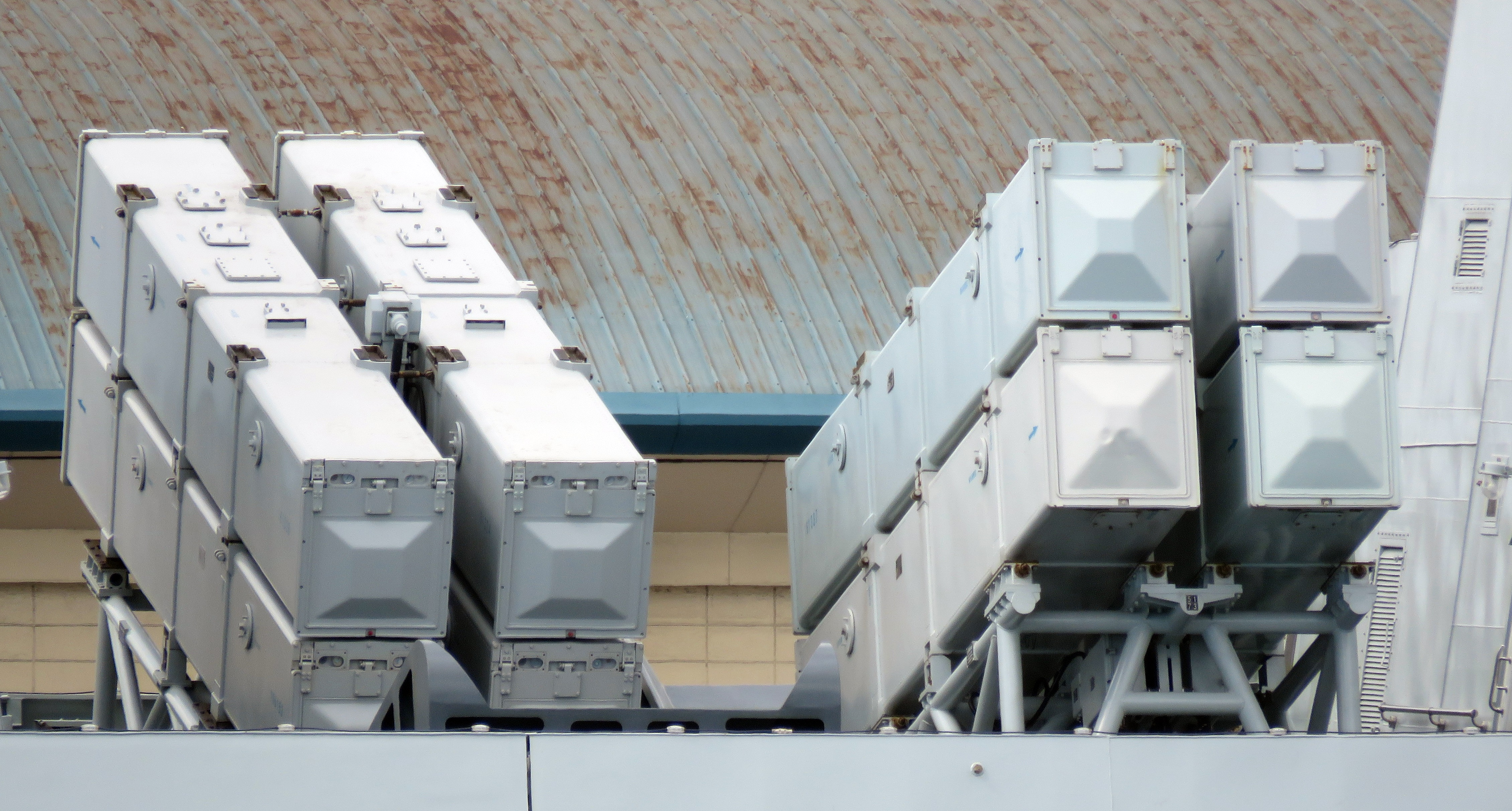
The YJ-83 anti-ship missile launchers on the Wuhu (539)

Type 054As have regularly deployed beyond China's regional waters.

Ships have participated in anti-piracy naval patrols off Somalia. The first was Huangshan, which deployed as part of China's second rotation in April 2019. From there, the ships have been detached to respond to regional crises. Frigates evacuated Chinese citizens from Libya in 2011 - making Xuzhou the first PLAN ship to enter the Mediterranean Sea - and Yemen in 2015. Another joined an international effort to secure Syria's chemical weapons in 2014.

Frigates also participated in the first Chinese naval exercises with the Russian Navy in the Mediterranean in 2015 and the Baltic Sea in 2017.

== Export ==
=== Thailand ===
In January 2013, it was confirmed that China offered three Type 054As to the Royal Thai Navy for US$1 billion. Ultimately, Thailand selected a derivative of the South Korean Gwanggaeto the Great-class destroyer from Daewoo Shipbuilding & Marine Engineering.

=== Pakistan ===
Pakistan ordered four Type 054A variants from Hudong-Zhonghua Shipbuilding in 2017-2018 as the Type 054A/P, or Tughril class. The first entered service on 8 November 2021, and all four were commissioned by mid 2022.

== Ships of class ==
Pennant number	Name	Namesake	Builder	Launched	Commissioned	Fleet	Status
Type 054A
529	舟山 / Zhoushan	City of Zhoushan	Hudong-Zhonghua	21 December 2006	3 January 2008	East Sea Fleet	Active
530	徐州 / Xuzhou	City of Xuzhou	Huangpu Shipyard	30 September 2006	27 January 2008	East Sea Fleet	Active
570	黄山 / Huangshan	City of Huangshan	Huangpu Shipyard	18 March 2007	15 May 2008	South Sea Fleet	Active
568	衡阳 / Hengyang	City of Hengyang	Hudong-Zhonghua	23 May 2007	30 June 2008	South Sea Fleet	Active
571	运城 / Yuncheng	City of Yuncheng	Huangpu Shipyard	8 February 2009	December 2009	South Sea Fleet	Active
569	玉林 / Yulin	City of Yulin, Guangxi	Hudong-Zhonghua	28 April 2009	1 February 2010	South Sea Fleet	Active
548	益阳 / Yiyang	City of Yiyang	Huangpu Shipyard	17 November 2009	26 October 2010	East Sea Fleet	Active
549	常州 / Changzhou	City of Changzhou	Hudong-Zhonghua	18 May 2010	30 May 2011	East Sea Fleet	Active
538	烟台 / Yantai	City of Yantai	Huangpu Shipyard	August 2010	June 2011	North Sea Fleet	Active
546	盐城 / Yancheng	City of Yancheng	Hudong-Zhonghua	27 April 2011	5 June 2012	North Sea Fleet	Active
572	衡水 / Hengshui	City of Hengshui	Huangpu Shipyard	2011	9 July 2012	South Sea Fleet	Active
547	临沂 / Linyi	City of Linyi	Huangpu Shipyard	December 2011	22 December 2012	North Sea Fleet	Active
573	柳州 / Liuzhou	City of Liuzhou	Hudong-Zhonghua	10 December 2011	26 December 2012	South Sea Fleet	Active
575	岳阳 / Yueyang	City of Yueyang	Huangpu Shipyard	19 May 2012	3 May 2013	South Sea Fleet	Active
550	潍坊 / Weifang	City of Weifang	Hudong-Zhonghua	9 July 2012	22 June 2013	North Sea Fleet	Active
574	三亚 / Sanya	City of Sanya	Hudong-Zhonghua	30 November 2012	13 December 2013	South Sea Fleet	Active
Type 054A+ (stretched)
577	黄冈 / Huanggang	City of Huanggang	Hudong-Zhonghua	28 April 2013	16 January 2015	East Sea Fleet	Active
576	大庆 / Daqing	City of Daqing	Huangpu Shipyard	8 October 2013	16 January 2015	North Sea Fleet	Active
578	扬州 / Yangzhou	City of Yangzhou	Hudong-Zhonghua	30 September 2013	21 September 2015	East Sea Fleet	Active
579	邯郸 / Handan	City of Handan	Huangpu Shipyard	26 July 2014	16 August 2015	North Sea Fleet	Active
532	荆州 / Jingzhou	City of Jingzhou	Hudong-Zhonghua	22 January 2015	5 January 2016	East Sea Fleet	Active
531	湘潭 / Xiangtan	City of Xiangtan	Huangpu Shipyard	19 March 2015	24 February 2016	East Sea Fleet	Active
515	滨州 / Binzhou	City of Binzhou	Hudong-Zhonghua	13 December 2015	29 December 2016	East Sea Fleet	Active
536	许昌 / Xuchang	City of Xuchang	Huangpu Shipyard	30 May 2016	23 June 2017	South Sea Fleet	Active
539	芜湖 / Wuhu	City of Wuhu	Hudong-Zhonghua	8 June 2016	29 June 2017	North Sea Fleet	Active
598	日照 / Rizhao	City of Rizhao	Huangpu Shipyard	1 April 2017	12 January 2018	North Sea Fleet	Active
599	安阳 / Anyang	City of Anyang	Hudong-Zhonghua	28 March 2017	12 April 2018	East Sea Fleet	Active
500	咸宁 / Xianning	City of Xianning	Huangpu Shipyard	22 September 2017	28 August 2018	South Sea Fleet	Active
601	南通 / Nantong	City of Nantong	Hudong-Zhonghua	16 December 2017	23 January 2019	East Sea Fleet	Active
542	枣庄 / Zaozhuang	City of Zaozhuang	Huangpu Shipyard	30 June 2018	22 February 2019	North Sea Fleet	Active
522	资阳 / Ziyang	City of Ziyang	Huangpu Shipyard	12 July 2021	27 May 2022	East Sea Fleet	Active
534	鹤壁 / Hebi	City of Hebi	Hudong-Zhonghua	1 August 2021	December 2022	East Sea Fleet	Active
551	巴彦淖尔市 / Bayannao'er	City of Bayannao'er	Huangpu Shipyard	23 December 2021	December 2022	South Sea Fleet	Active
540	西昌 / Xichang	City of Xichang	Huangpu Shipyard	November 2021	2023	South Sea Fleet	Active
537	宜兴 / Yixing	City of Yixing	Hudong-Zhonghua	23 December 2021	January 2023	East Sea Fleet	Active
516	淮北 / Huaibei	City of Huaibei	Huangpu Shipyard	11 August 2022	July 2023	East Sea Fleet	Active
523	红河 / Honghe	City of Honghe	Hudong-Zhonghua			East Sea Fleet	Active
552	郴州 / Chenzhou	City of Chenzhou	Huangpu Shipyard			South Sea Fleet	Active
553	大理 / Dali	City of Dali	Huangpu Shipyard			South Sea Fleet	Active
554	通辽 / Tongliao	City of Tongliao	Huangpu Shipyard			South Sea Fleet	Active
Type 054AG (stretched and with 100 mm gun)
543	臨汾 / Linfen	City of Linfen			2024		Active
580	鄂尔多斯 / Ordos	City of Ordos			2024		Active

== Gallery ==
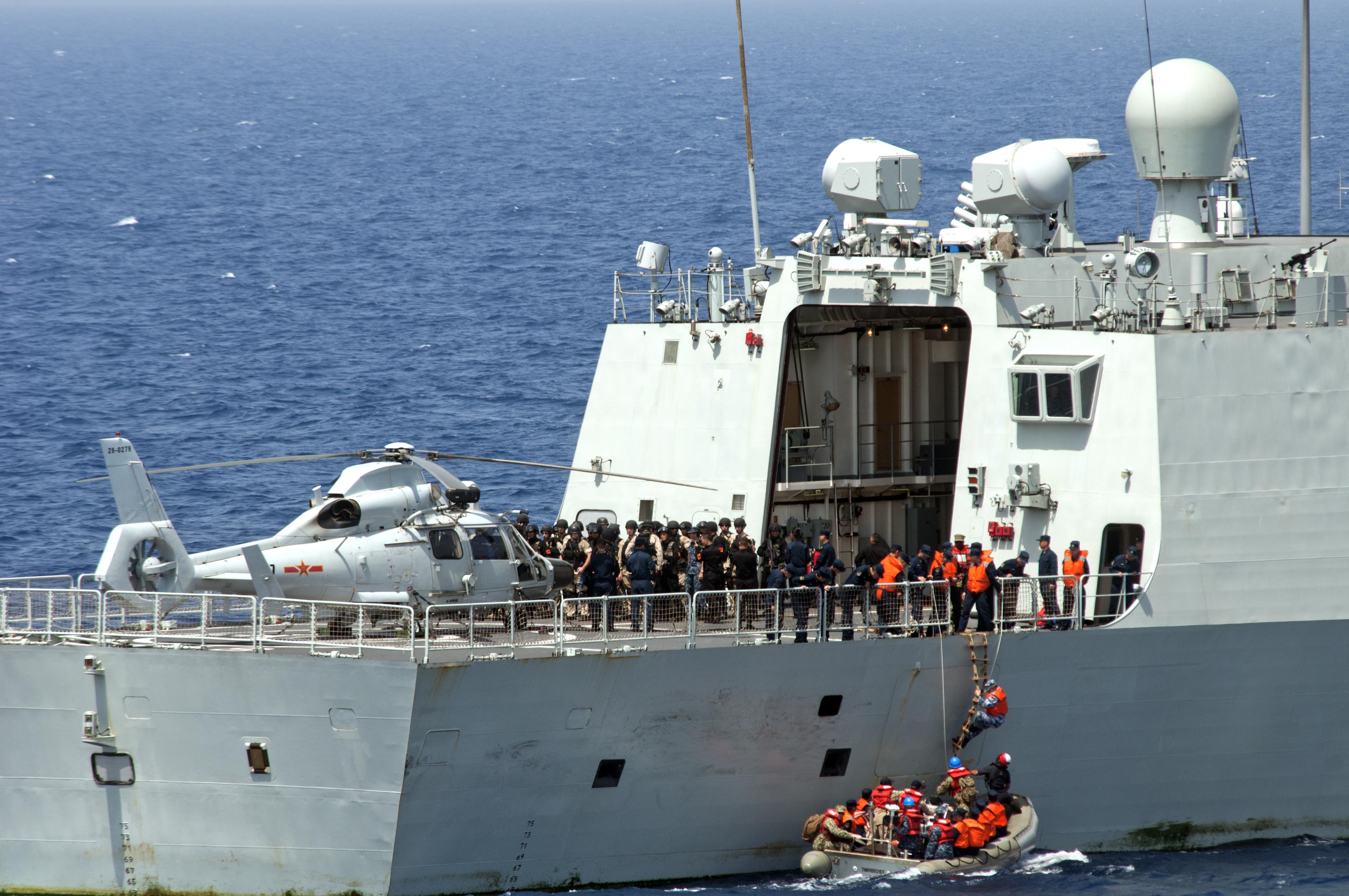
Aft-deck of frigate Yiyang (548) with PLAN and USN personnel, and a Harbin Z-9 helicopter

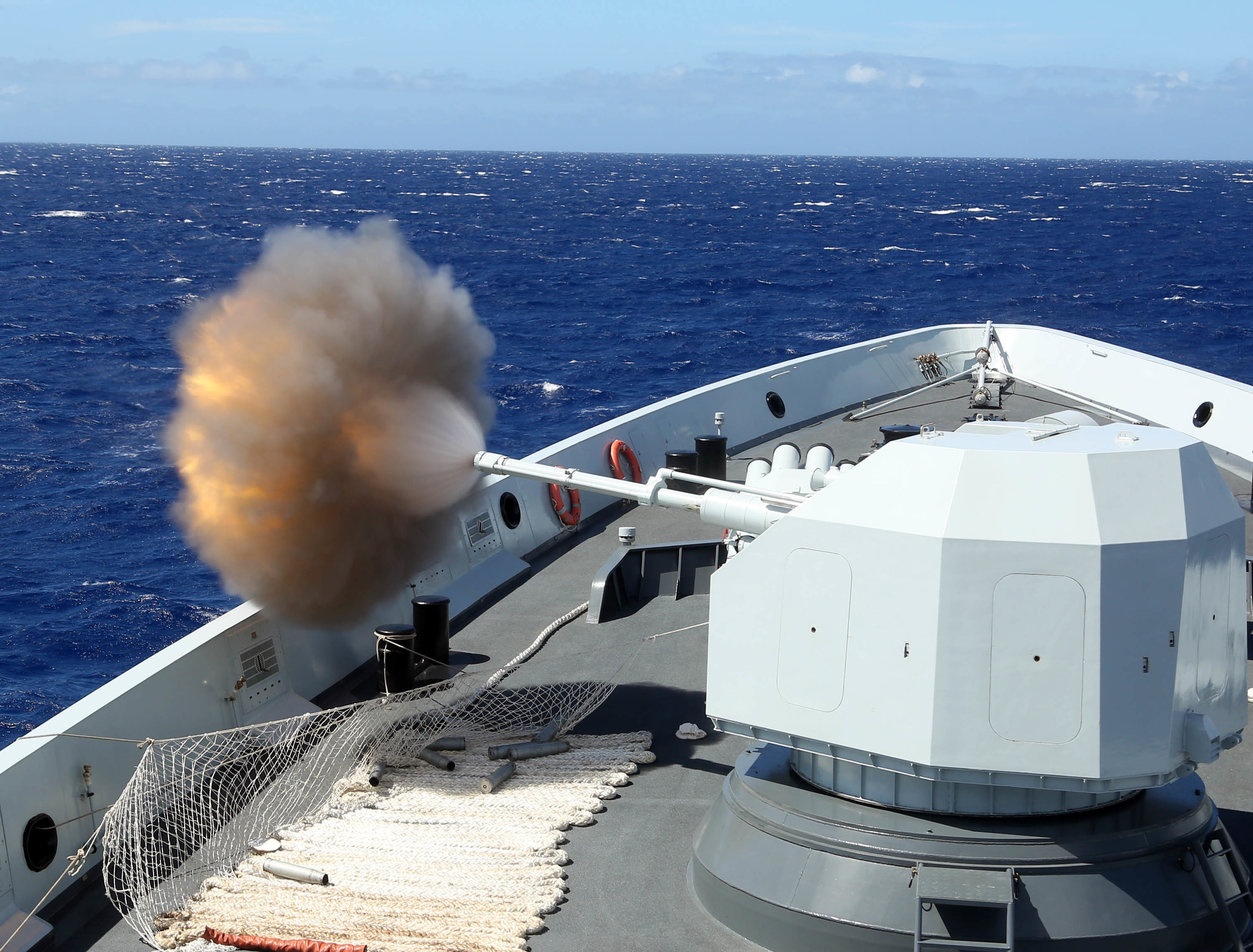
H/PJ-26 76mm main gun onboard Hengshui (572)

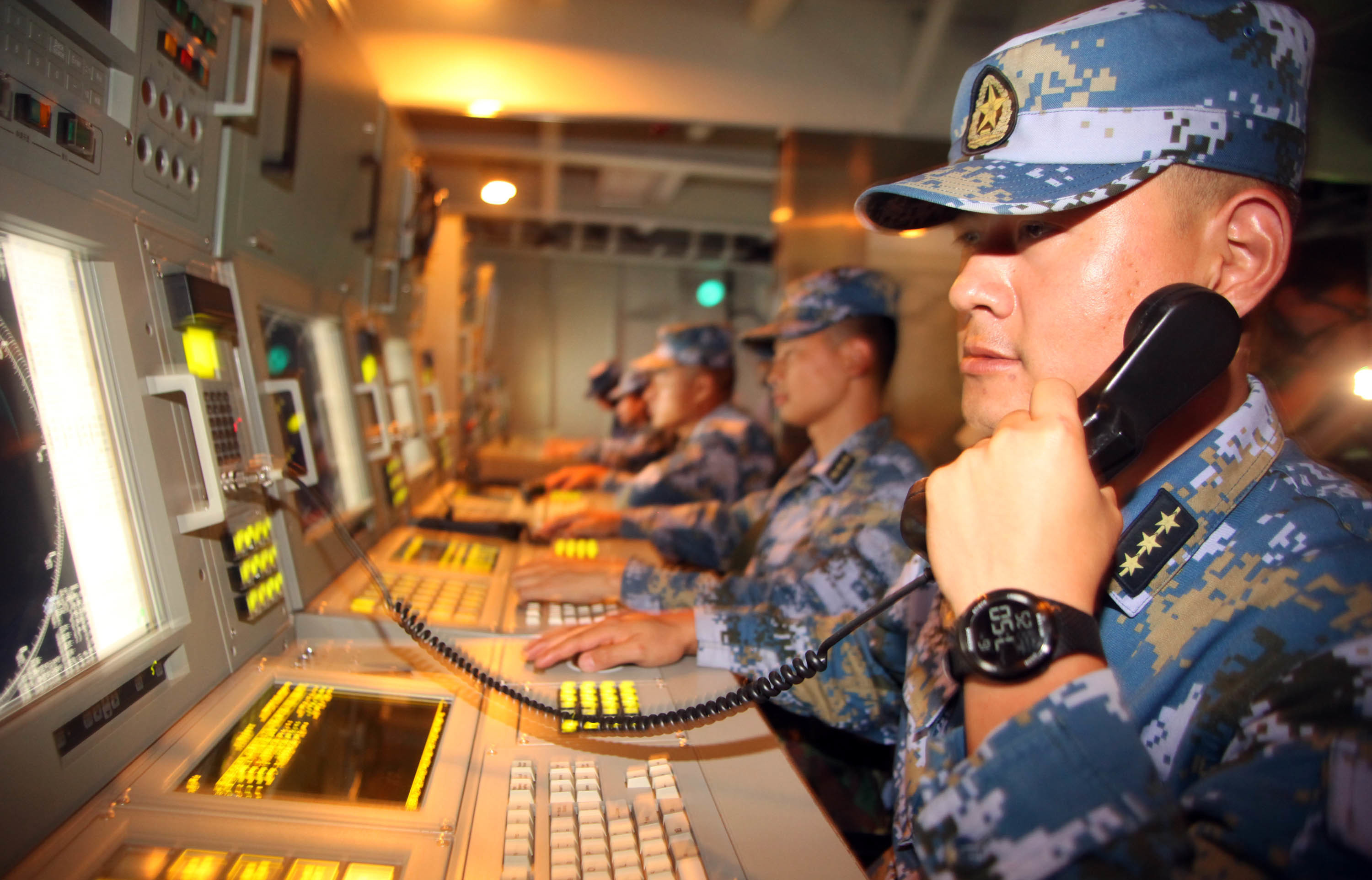
Weapon control station of Chinese Navy Ship Hengshui (572)

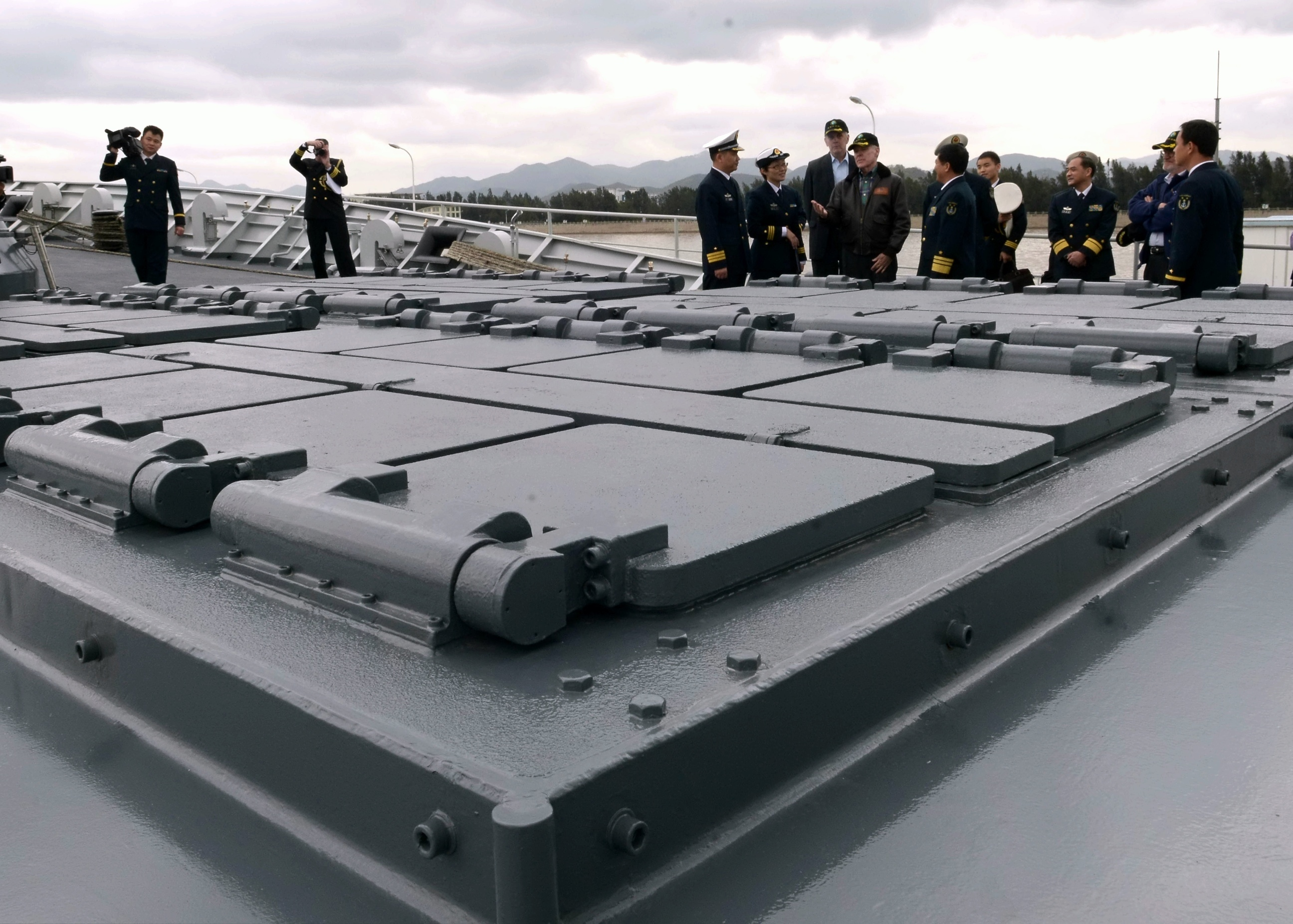
HQ-16 VLS SAM launchers on Xuzhou (530)

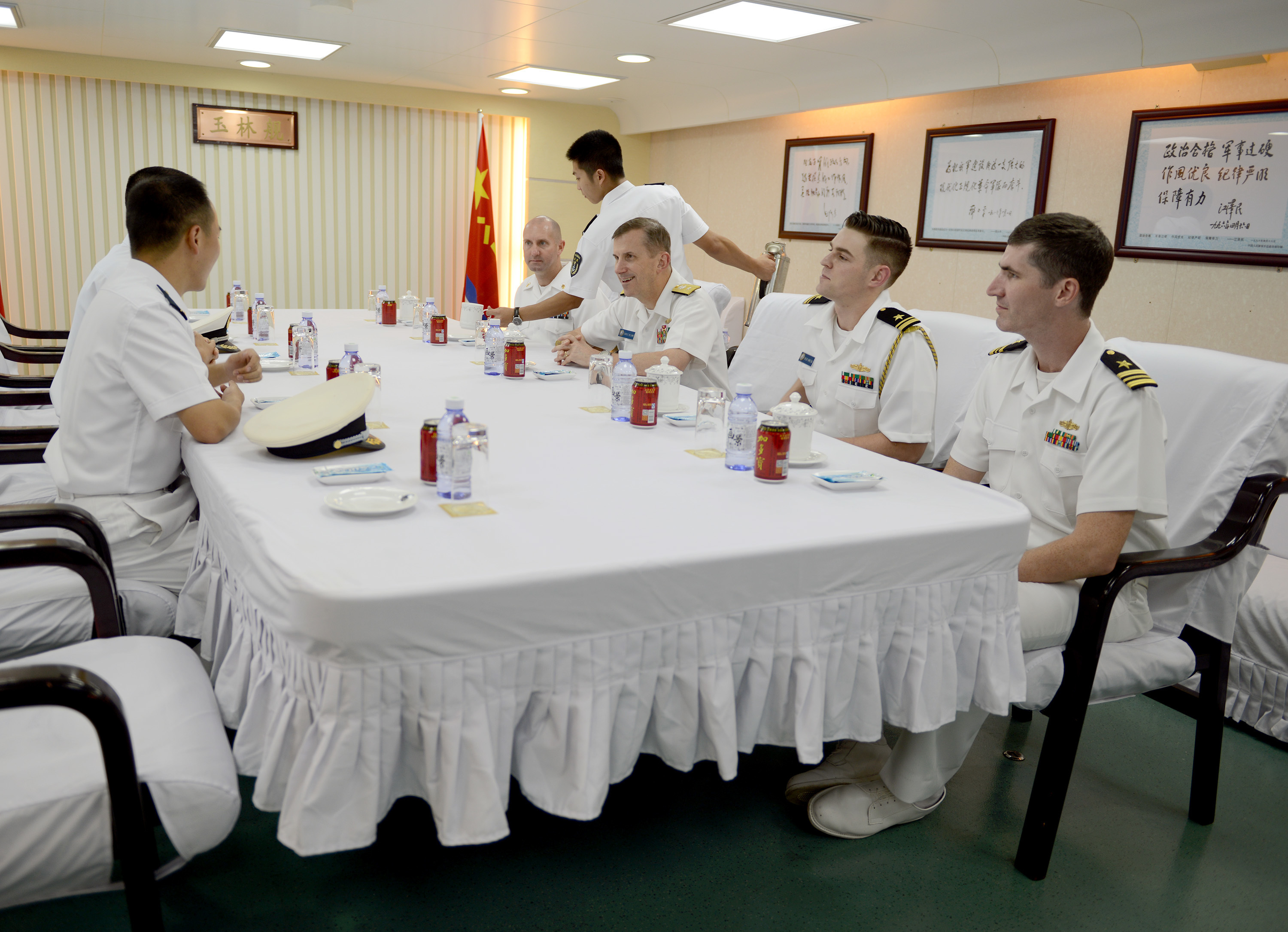
The meeting room facility onboard Yulin (569)

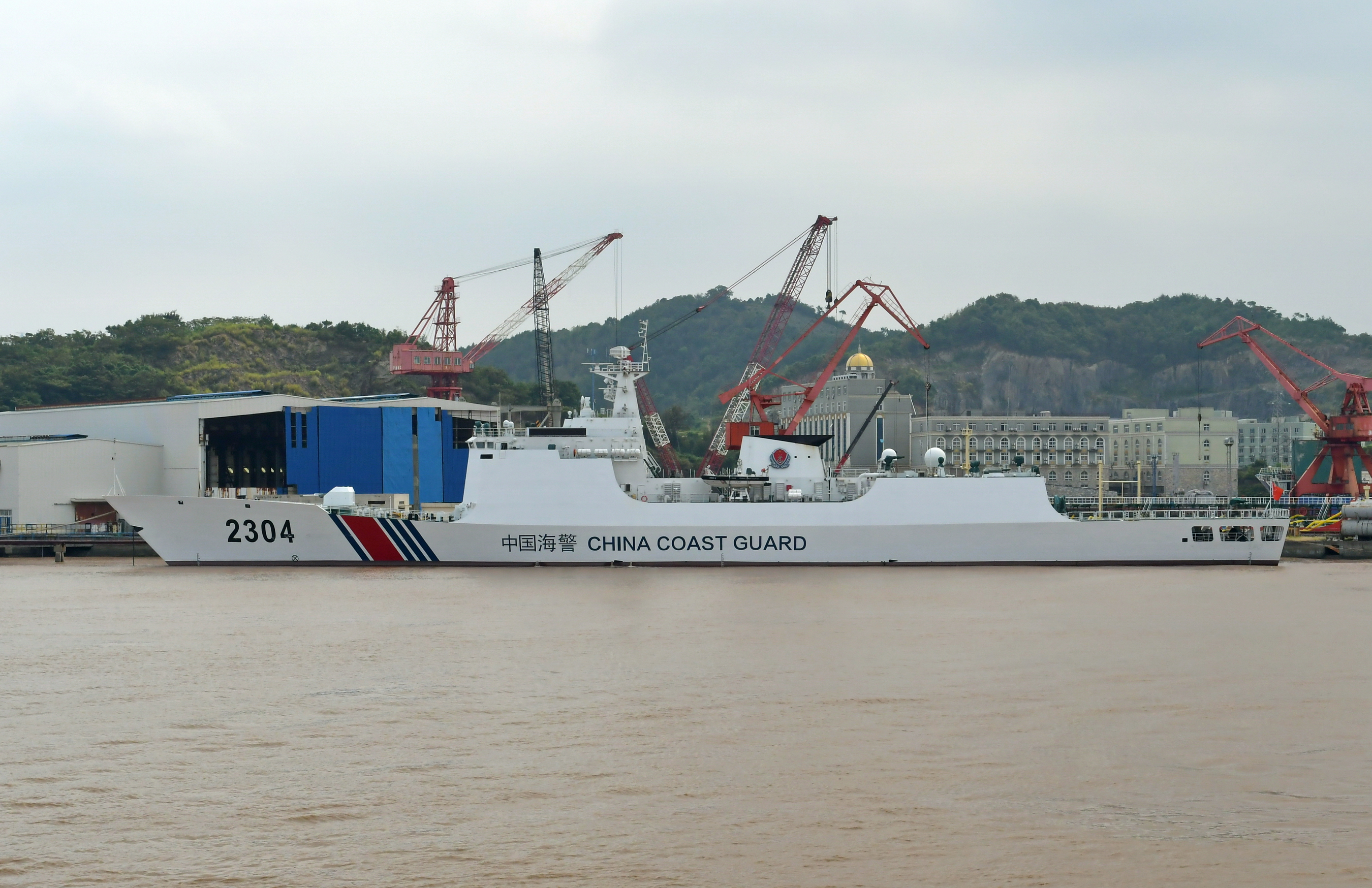
China Coast Guard Type 818 class patrol cutter Baita (2304)

== See also ==
- List of frigate classes in service

Equivalent frigates of the same era

- De Zeven Provinciën class
- Sachsen class
- FREMM
- Iver Huitfeldt class
- Álvaro de Bazán class
- Project 22350
