= Shaanxi Diesel Engine Heavy Industry =

Chinese diesel engines manufacturer

- Native name: 陕西柴油机重工有限公司
- Romanized name: Shǎnxī cháiyóujī zhònggōng yǒuxiàn gōngsī
- Industry: Automotive parts
- Headquarters: Shaanxi, China
- Products: Engines and generators
- Parent: China Shipbuilding Industry Corporation
- Website: www.sxd408.com

Shaanxi Diesel Engine Heavy Industry, Co. Ltd. (Chinese: 陕西柴油机重工有限公司; pinyin: Shǎnxī cháiyóujī zhònggōng yǒuxiàn gōngsī)) of Shaanxi, China is a major producer of diesel-powered electrical generators, high-speed prime movers for large-scale marine applications, and is one of China's key state enterprises for the production of such engines.

== Parent Company ==
Shaanxi Diesel Engine Heavy Industry, Co. Ltd. is a subsidiary of China Shipbuilding Industry Corporation.

== Diesel Engines ==
The company's large 150-series diesel engines produce between 98 and 1072 hp (73 and 800 kW).

In addition, their smaller 396-series engines are produced under license from MTU Friedrichshafen, and are intended for use in vehicles, oil production equipment, small marine applications, and the generation of power.

Shaanxi Diesel's stand-alone power generators are rated for 102 to 536 hp (76 to 400 kW).

They also produce engines under license for MAN Diesel.

The company also produces diesel propulsion engines for warships such as the Type 054A frigate, of which the design is licensed from SEMT Pielstick. The engine produced is the 16-cylinder PA6 STC.

== Automotive Fuel Injection Systems ==
They are an aftermarket provider as well, producing 50 different types of injector pumps and nozzles.

== Export Sales ==
At present, Shaanxi Diesel exports its products to more than 20 countries.
