= Type 382 radar =

Naval air search radar

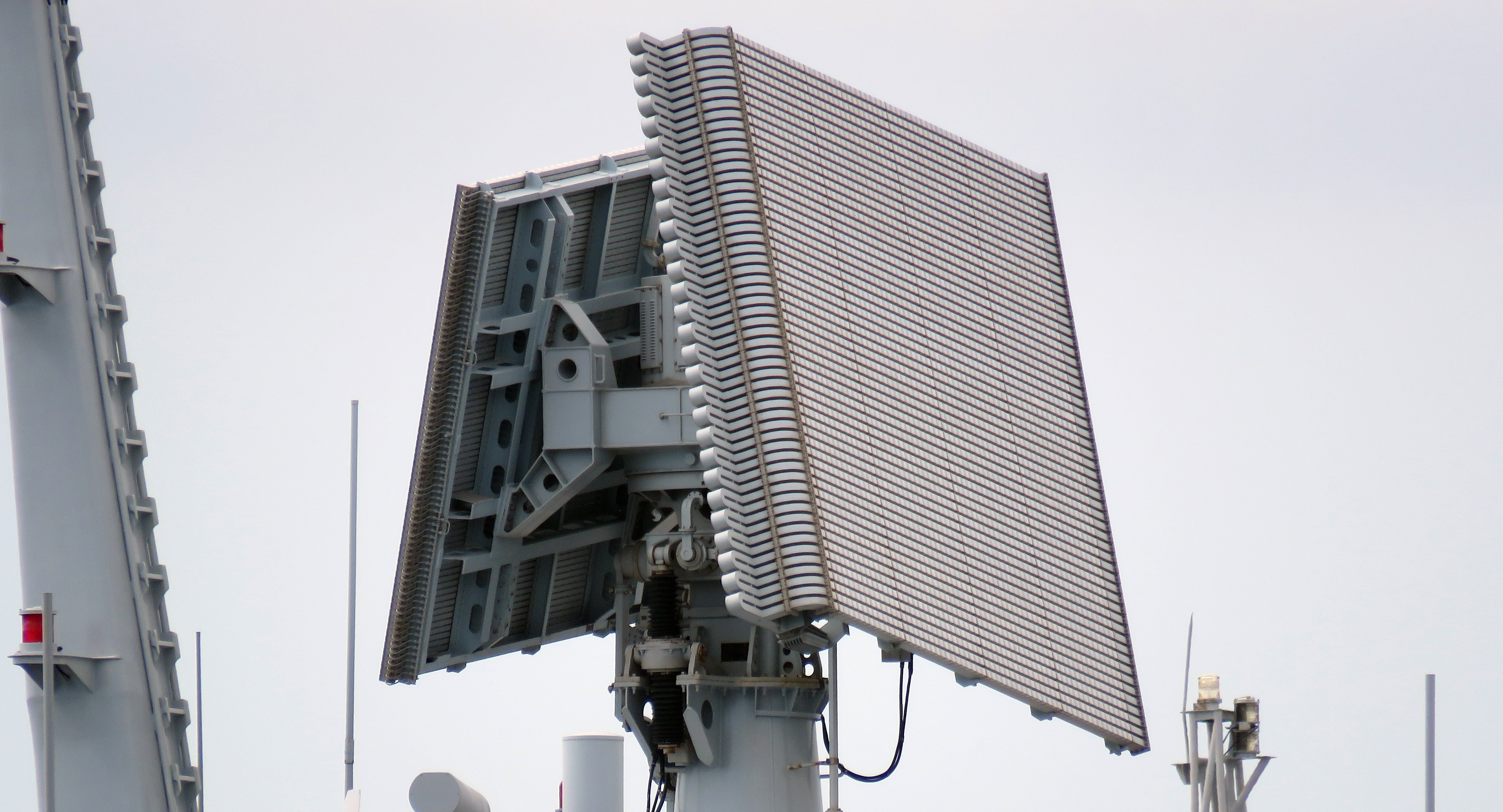
Type 382 installed on a Type 054A frigate.

The Type 382 (or H/LJQ-382) is a 3-D naval air search radar developed by the People's Republic of China. It uses two back-to-back planar arrays on a rotating mount.

The relationship between the Type 382 and the Russian Fregat MAE-3 radar (NATO reporting name: Top Plate) is unclear. In 2015, Type 382 was identified as the Fregat by Kirchberger and Jane's Fighting Ships, or possibly a reverse engineered version. At the same time, Schwartz stated that the Type 382 was "quite advanced" compared to Russian radar. In 2020, Wertheim used "Top Plate" in conjunction with the Chinese designation.
