= Type 345 Radar =

Type 345
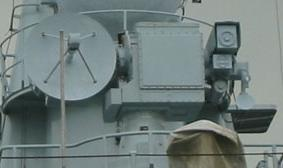
- Type 345 Fire Control Radar of the Luhai Class. Taken at IMDEX2003
- Country of origin: People's Republic of China
- Type: Fire-Control
- Frequency: Ku/J band
- PRF: 3600 pps or 7200 pps
- Pulsewidth: unknown
- RPM: unknown
- Range: 30km against 2m2 RCS aircraft; 15km against sea-skimming target
- Altitude: unknown
- Diameter: unknown
- Azimuth: unknown
- Elevation: -25-85
- Precision: unknown
- Power: 30 kW

The Type 345 (MR35) fire-control radar system is used to guide the HQ-7 short-range surface-to-air missile. The system is installed on many modern and retrofitted Chinese navy ships.

The Type 345 fire control radar appears to be based on the Thomson-CSF Castor CTM (Conduite de Tir Multisensor) fire control radar, which is a Castor II/J with a separate IR camera (Piraña) and TV tracker and not the oft quoted Castor IIC. It is possible, however, that the Castor IIC was bought initially, but the CTM was also bought later.

It uses a TWT transmitter with a Cassegrain antenna. Pulse compression (7.5 μs pulse) and pulse Doppler processing (first blind speed 1000 m/s) techniques are used, and it can acquire ASHM at 18 km and fighter at 30 km with a tracking range between 350 m and 30 km.

== Specifications ==
- System: Radar+ IR compound tracking
- Band: Ku band
- IR: 3~5 μm & 8~12 μm
- Range performance: 30 km against 2 m² RCS aircraft; 15 km against sea-skimming target
- Radar beam width: 1.2°
- IR FOV: 1.3° X 1°
- Tracking coverage: 360° (Az); -30°~85° (El)
- Tracking Radar
  - Frequency: Ku band
  - Polarization: Horizontal
  - Antenna type: Cassegrain antenna
- IR Tracker
  - Spectral band 3~5 μm
  - Pixel Resolution: 320x240
  - FOV: 1.3° X 1°
- Transmitter
  - Antenna gain: 21 dB
  - Beam width: Wide 20°, Narrow 3°
- Ambient temperature
  - Antenna: -25–+70 °C
- Power supply
  - 115 V/50 Hz 3-phase AC: 5 kW
  - 115 V/400 Hz 3-phase AC: 1 kW

== See also ==
- Type 052 Luhu class destroyer
- Type 051B Luhai class destroyer
- Type 053H Jiangwei class frigate
