= H/AKJ-16 =

Chinese vertical launching system

H/AJK-16 vertical launching system
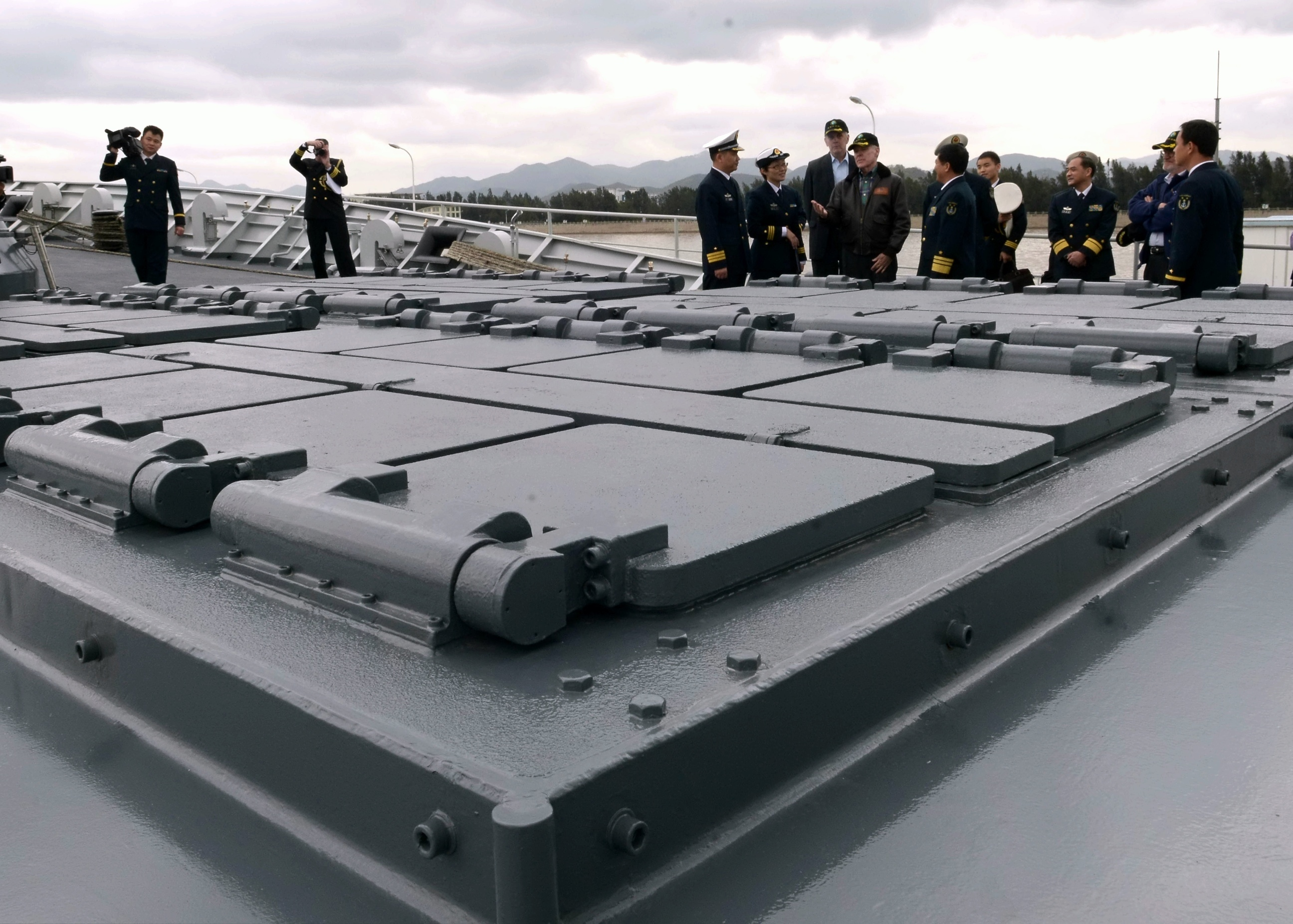
- Four racks of 8-tube cells onboard the frigate Xuzhou
- Type: Missile launching system
- Place of origin: China

Service history
- Used by: PLAN

H/AJK-16 is a Chinese hot-launch vertical launching system (VLS) used aboard the People's Liberation Army Navy (PLAN) surface combatants. When introduced on the Type 054A frigate, it was China's first modern naval VLS system.

== Specifications ==
The cells have a square cross-section with 650-millimetre (26 in) sides. The length of the launch tube is not publicly known.

As a hot-launch system, it has a limited choice of compatible missiles, those being the HQ-16 family of surface-to-air missiles and the Yu-8 rocket-assisted torpedoes for anti-submarine warfare.

== Current Operators ==
- China
  - Type 054A frigate - 32 cells (4x8)
  - Type 054B frigate - 32 cells (4x8)
  - Type 054AG corvette - 32 cells (4x8)

== See also ==
- GJB 5860-2006 - a new, larger, standard Chinese VLS.
- K-VLS - A vertical launching system of Republic of Korea Navy.
- Mark 41 Vertical Launching System - A vertical launching system of United States Navy.
- Poliment-Redut - A vertical launching system of Russian Navy, navalized version of S-350.
- 3S-14 - A vertical launching system of Russian Navy for cruise, anti-ship and anti-submarine missiles.
- Sylver - A vertical launching system designed by DCNS.
