= ROCS Tian Dan =

Cheng Kung-class frigates

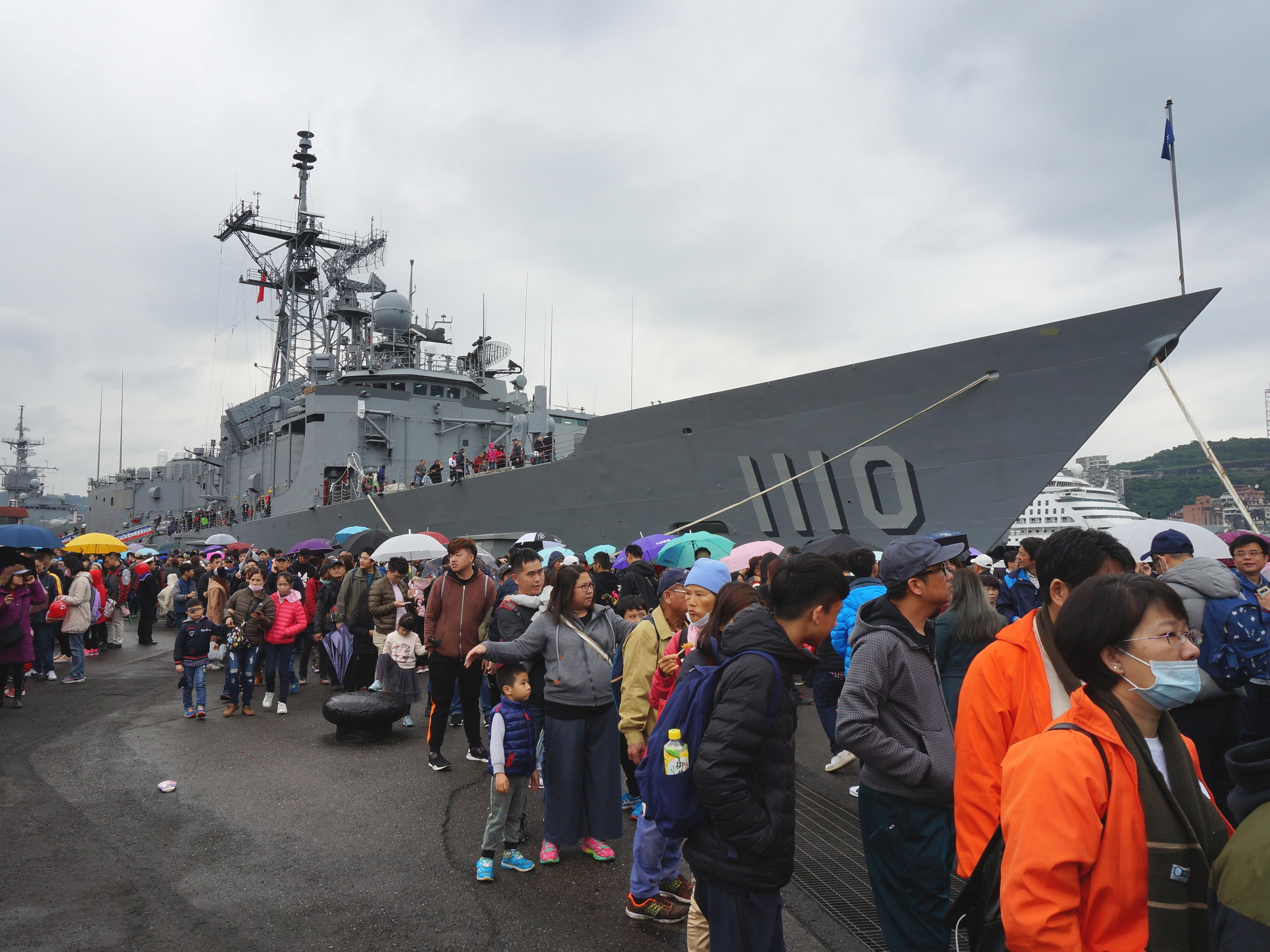
- ROCN Tian Dan on 24 March 2019

History

Republic of China
- Name: Tian Dan (田單)
- Namesake: Tian Dan
- Builder: China Shipbuilding Corp., Kaohsiung
- Laid down: 22 February 2001
- Launched: 17 October 2002
- Commissioned: 11 March 2004
- Home port: Tsoying
- Identification: Pennant number: PFG2-1110
- Status: in active service

General characteristics
- Class & type: Cheng Kung-class frigate
- Displacement: 4,103 long tons (4,169 t) full
- Length: 453 ft (138 m)
- Beam: 46.95 ft (14.31 m)
- Propulsion: General Electric LM2500-30 gas turbines, 41,000 shp (31,000 kW) total
- Speed: 29 knots (54 km/h; 33 mph)
- Complement: 18 officers; 180 enlisted; 19 flight crew
- Sensors & processing systems: AN/SPS-49 air-search radar; AN/SPS-55 surface-search radar; CAS, STIR gun fire control radar; SQS-56 sonar
- Electronic warfare & decoys: AN/SLQ-32(V)5; (AN/SLQ-32(V)2 + SIDEKICK)
- Armament: 40 × SM-1MR at Mk 13 Missile Launcher; 4 × Hsiung Feng II and 4 HF-3 supersonic AShM; 1 × OTO Melara 76 mm naval gun; 2 × Bofors 40mm/L70mm guns; 1 × 20 mm Phalanx CIWS; 2 × triple Mark 32 ASW torpedo tubes with Mark 46 anti-submarine torpedoes
- Aircraft carried: Sikorsky S-70C-1/2
- Aviation facilities: Hangar and helipad

ROCS Tian Dan (田單, PFG2-1110) is the eighth ship of the Cheng Kung-class guided-missile frigates of the Republic of China Navy (ROCN), which was based on the Oliver Hazard Perry class of the United States Navy. Tian Dan was intended to be the first hull of the second batch of the class, with improved armament and electronics. However, delays in the development of the weapon systems and electronics led to the second batch being cancelled. In 1999, the first ship of the second batch was re-ordered to the standard design with all the improvements to the design. The ship was constructed beginning in 2001 by the China Shipbuilding Corporation in Taiwan and the frigate was launched in 2002 and entered service with the ROCN in 2004. In 2014, Tian Dan was among the Taiwanese vessels sent to assist in the search for the missing Malaysia Airlines MH370 flight.

== Design and description ==
The Cheng Kung class are based on the long-hulled version of the Oliver Hazard Perry-class frigates of the United States Navy but with modifications. The class was intended to be built in two batches, with Batch I built to the standard design, and Batch II constructed to an improved design, incorporating new technologies. The standard initially had a light displacement of 3,100 long tons (3,100 t) and a full load displacement of 4,200 long tons (4,300 t). They initially measured 455 feet 5 inches (138.81 m) long overall and 413 ft 1 in (125.91 m) at the waterline with a beam of 45 ft (14 m) and a maximum draft of 18 ft 8 in (5.69 m). They are powered by two General Motors LM-2500 gas turbines turning one shaft connected to a controllable pitch propeller, creating 41,000 shaft horsepower (31,000 kW). They also have two drop-down auxiliary propulsion units that create 720 hp (540 kW). This gives them a maximum speed of 29 knots (54 km/h; 33 mph). They carry 587 long tons (596 t) of fuel giving them a range of 5,000 nautical miles (9,300 km; 5,800 mi) at 18 knots (33 km/h; 21 mph). The ships have four 1,000 kW diesel alternator sets for generating electricity. For additional stability in heavy seas, the ships have fin stabilizers. The frigates have a crew of 206 including 13 officers and an air group of 19.

The frigates were initially armed with eight Hsiung Feng II SSMs placed in two box launchers located atop the superstructure aft of the bridge. They also mounted a Mark 13 launcher for 40 RIM-66 Standard MR surface-to-air missiles. They have an OTO Melara 76-millimetre (3 in)/62 dual-purpose naval gun situated forward and two single-mounted Bofors 40 mm (1.6 in)/L70 guns. the 40 mm guns cannot be crewed while the 76 mm gun is firing due to blast effects. (Note: /62 refers to the length of the gun in terms of calibers. A /62 gun is 62 times as long as it is in bore diameter.) The Cheng Kung class mounts a 20 mm (0.79 in)/76 Phalanx close-in weapon system (CIWS) atop the hangar. Flanking the CIWS atop the hangar are two Type 75 20 mm/75 guns. For ASW, the frigates are armed with two triple-mounted 324 mm (12.8 in) Mk 32 torpedo tubes for Mark 46 torpedoes.

The ships mount SPS-55 surface search radar, SPS-49(V)5 air search, Mark 92 fire control radar, STIR 24 missile fire control radar and Mark 90 Phalanx fire control radar. They are also equipped with DE 1160B hull-mounted sonar and are capable of using the ATAS towed passive sonar or the SQR-18A towed sonar. For electronic countermeasures, they mount the Chang Feng IV suite, which consists of the SLQ-32(V)5 radar warning system and the Sidekick radar jammer, and the SLQ-25 Nixie torpedo decoy system. The ships are equipped with the Prairie-Masker acoustic signature reduction system. The ships came designed with a hangar and aft helicopter deck capable of operating two helicopters. However, the ROCN had difficulty acquiring helicopters capable of operating from the class until they obtained the S-70C Thunderhawk helicopters from the United States. Though capable of operating two, only one is kept housed aboard the frigates. The ships use the Recovery Assist, Secure and Traverse (RAST) haul-down system for their helicopters.

=== Upgrades ===
The displacement of the Cheng Kung-clas frigates has varied over time. In 2009, it was reported that the vessels had a light displacement of 2,750 long tons (2,790 t) and a full load displacement of 4,105 long tons (4,171 t). Furthermore, their draft increased to a maximum of 24 ft 5 in (7.44 m). This increased again by 2013, with the ships displacing 3,207 long tons (3,258 t) light with a maximum draft of 28 ft 3 in (8.60 m).

The Cheng Kung class was initially fitted with eight Hsiung Feng II SSMs, instead of the Harpoon missiles that the Oliver Hazard Perry class used. Ships of the class began refitting with four Hsiung Feng III (HF III) missiles, replacing four of the Hsiung Feng II missiles after the new HF III missiles entered production. In addition, the ROCN ordered Harpoon missiles for use by the Cheng Kungs in September 2000. After the US stopped supporting the SM-1 and their associated launch system support was taken up by NCSIST which also implemented an upgrade program for the missiles. Upgrades to the SM-1 include a better rocket motor and an active seeker.

The class's Mk 75 main guns have been upgraded and have an improved firing rate of 100 rounds a minute.

== Construction and career ==
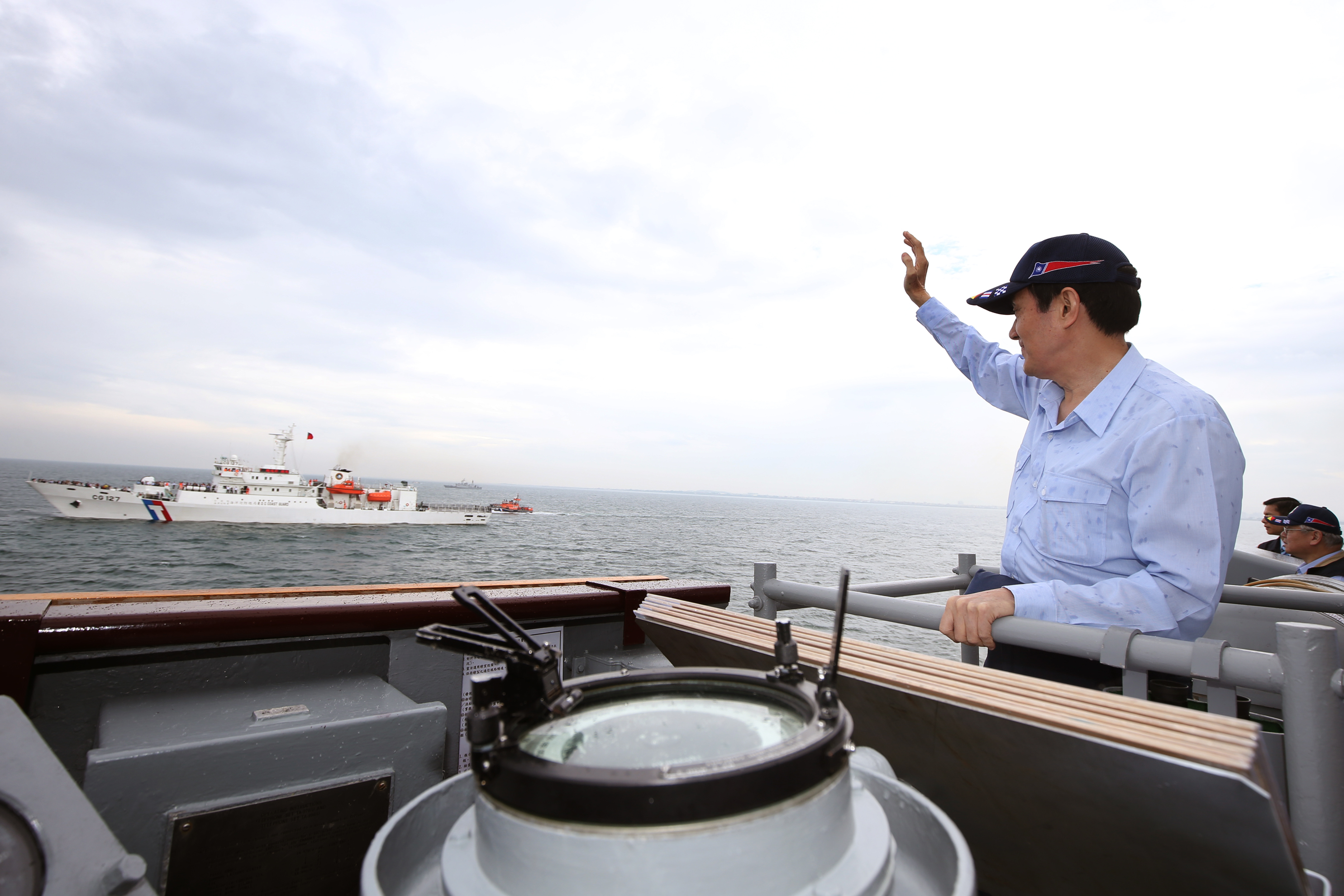
In 2015, President Ma Ying-jeou of the Republic of China boarded the Tian Dan warship to inspect the joint fishing protection exercise of the National Army and the Executive Yuan Coast Guard Administration, and waved to the New Taipei Ship (CG-127) of the Executive Yuan Coast Guard Administration's Marine Patrol Headquarters .

Tian Dan was initially ordered as the first ship of the second batch of the Cheng Kung class. However, the second batch was cancelled in October 1994. The ship was re-ordered from the China Shipbuilding Corporation at Kaoshuing, Taiwan, as a continuation of Batch I in January 1999, but funding for the vessel did not become available until December 2000. The frigate was laid down on 21 December 2001 and was launched on 15 October 2002. Named for a famous Chinese commander, the ship was commissioned on 11 March 2004. The Cheng Kung-class frigates make up the ROCN 146th Frigate Squadron.

On 14 March 2014, Tian Dan, along with two of Taiwan's Coastguard patrol vessels, arrived in the South China Sea between Malaysia and Vietnam to join the multi-national search and rescue operation for the missing Malaysia Airlines MH370 flight.

On June 11, 2018, during the Hanguang 34 exercise, the Tiandan was included in the Navy and Air Force missile shooting training mission. On July 15, the shooting detachment commander, Major General Wu Liping, led the ships to the Jiupeng Sea. Records show that at 7:07 on July 16, the captain of the Tiandan, Colonel Sun Kanghua, issued a permission to launch order. At 7:10:00, the Tiandan arrived at the launch position, heading 347 degrees T, speed 10 knots, and the target ship Zhongquan Landing Ship ((LST-221)) was at 067 degrees T, 47 kilometers away, 22 degrees 05 minutes north latitude, 121 degrees 3 minutes east longitude. At this time, the Tian Dan ship launched a Hsiung Feng III (No. 4 missile on the No. 2 launcher, numbered S015). The missile flew at a speed of 2.2 to 2.4 Mach and hit the No. 2 target ship at 7:11:11.

Participating in the 2019 Dunmu Expeditionary Training Detachment, with the ROCS Pan Shi as the flagship, the "Tian Dan" and the ROCS Wu Chang, and led by Major General Wang Guoqiang, the team stopped at Palau, Marshall Islands, Solomon Islands.

On March 24, 2023, this ship used broadcasting and tactical maneuvers to drive away the PLA Type 056A Tongren in the southern waters.

On August 19, 2023, the Navy dispatched this ship to monitor the PLA Xuzhou conducting military exercises in the waters around Taiwan.

== Gallery ==
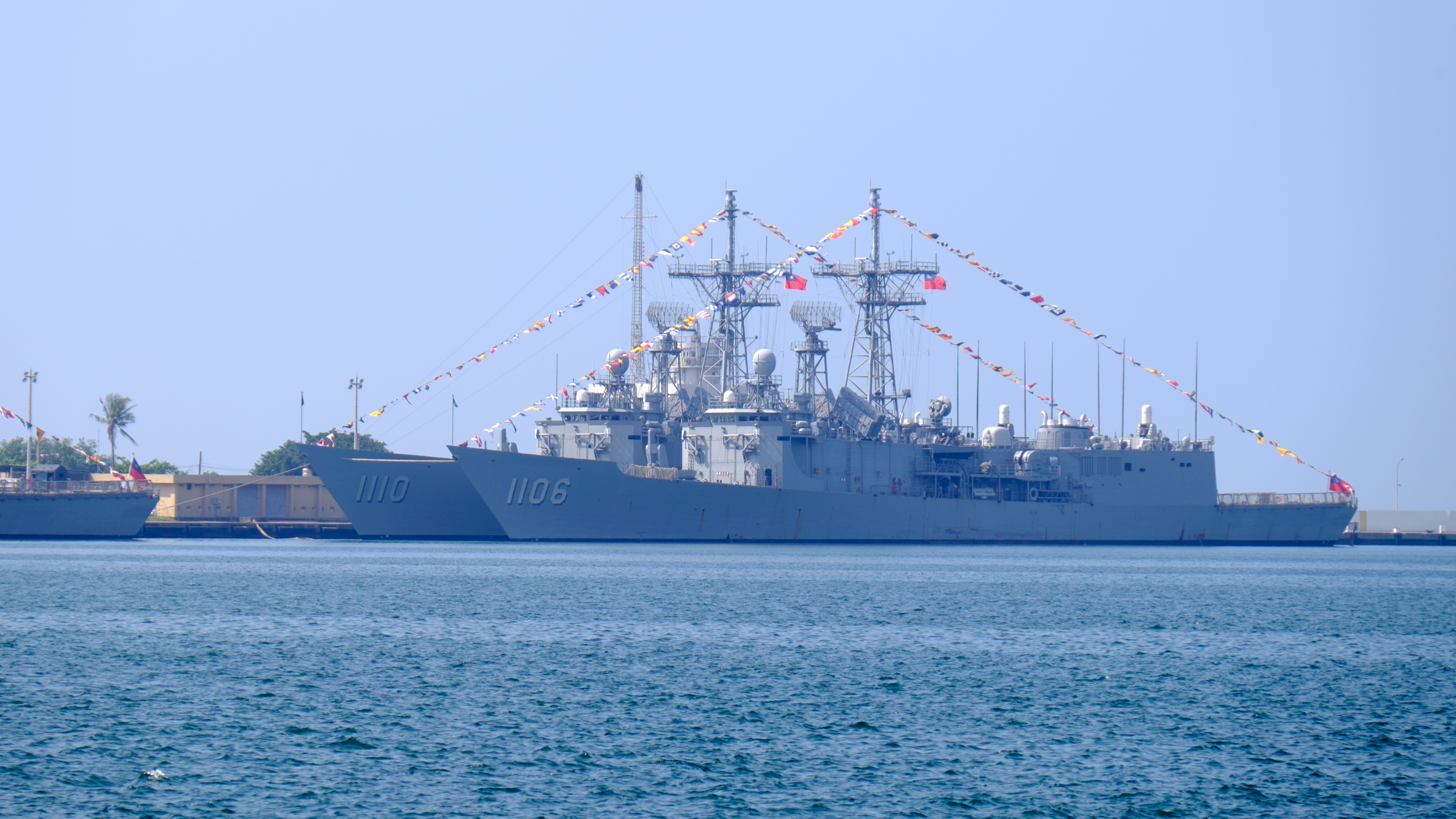
ROCS Yueh Fei and ROCS Tian Dan on 24 October 2015

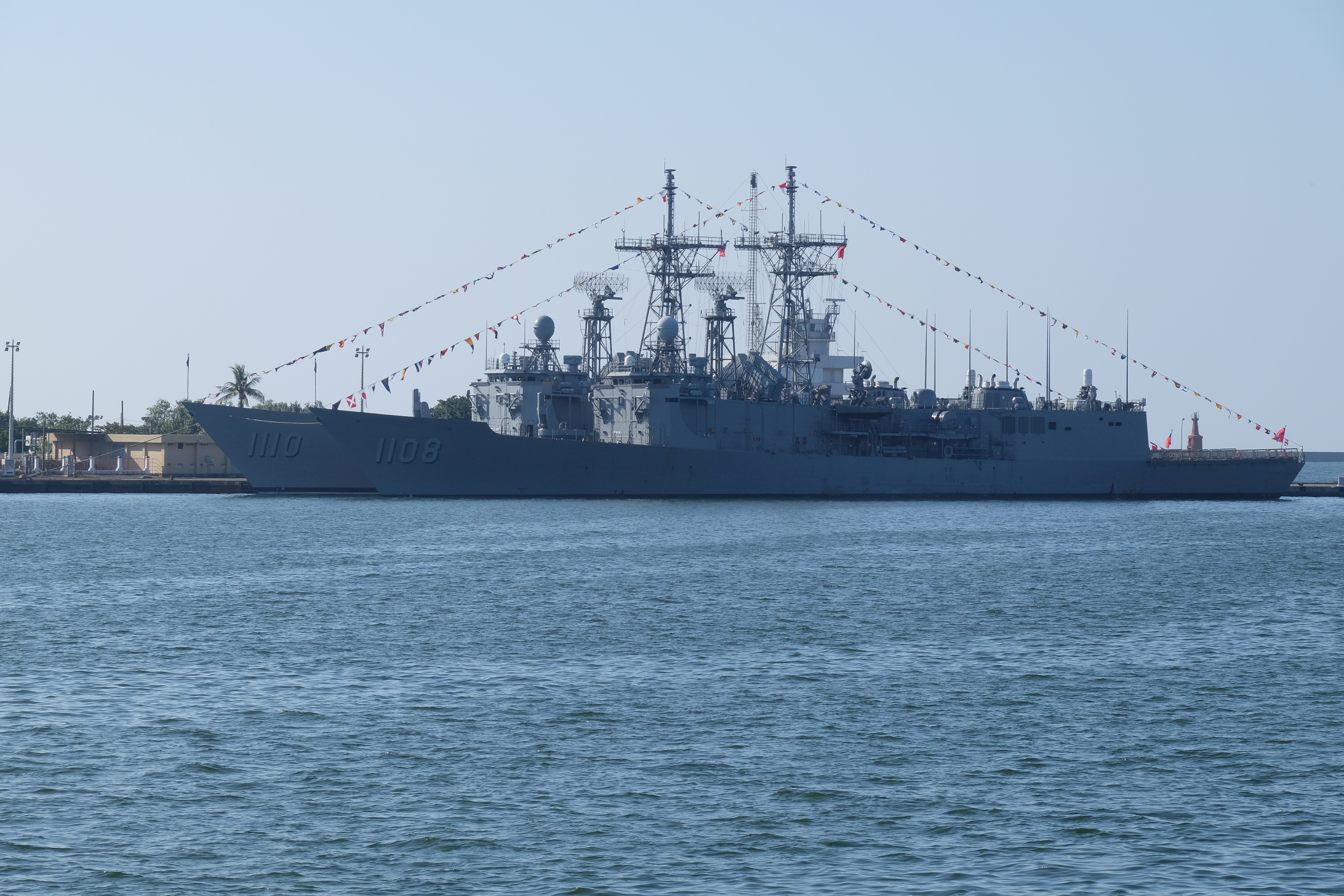
ROCS Pan Chao and ROCS Tian Dan on 23 November 2014

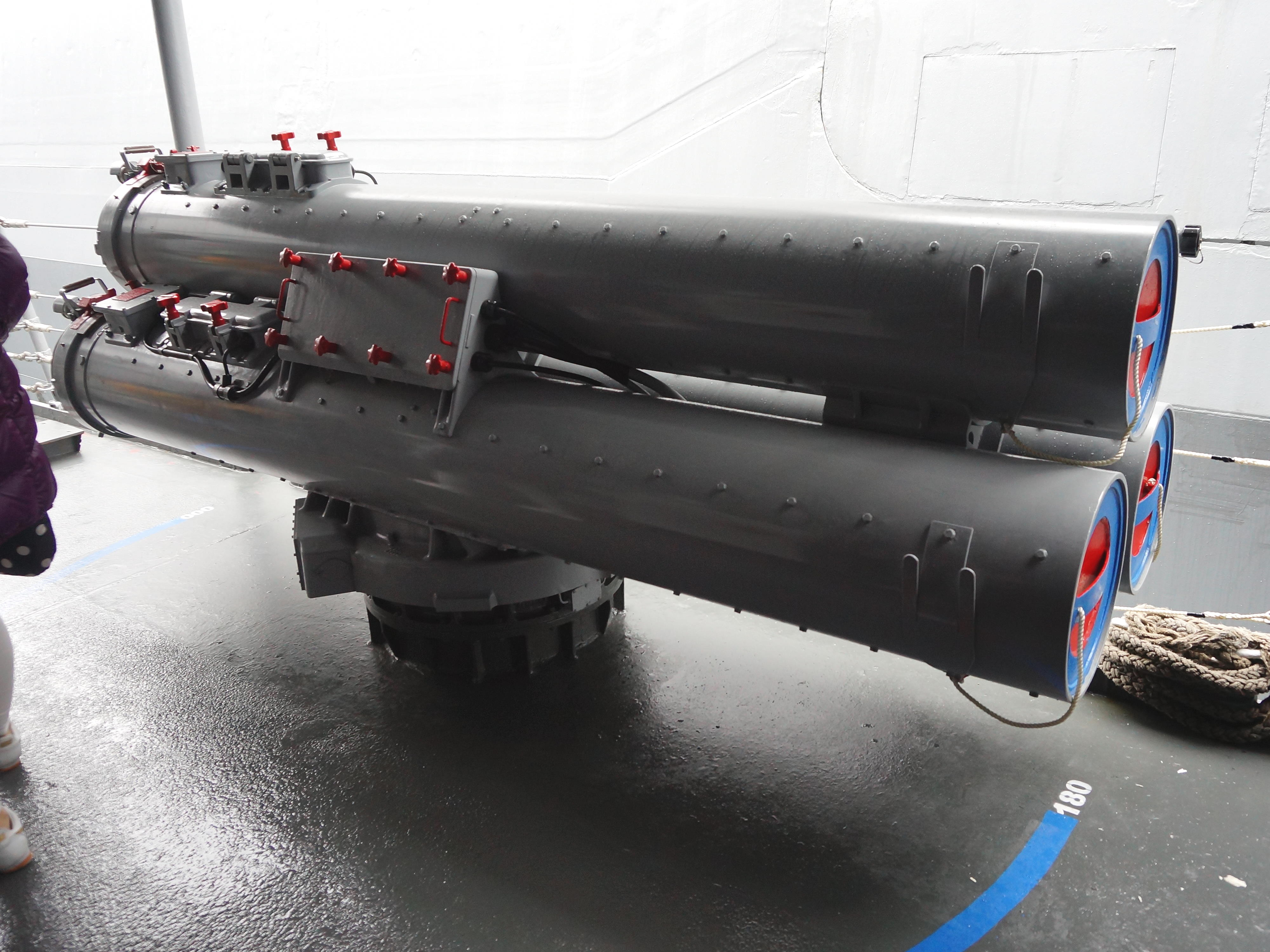
ROCS Tian Dan's Mark 32 torpedo tubes

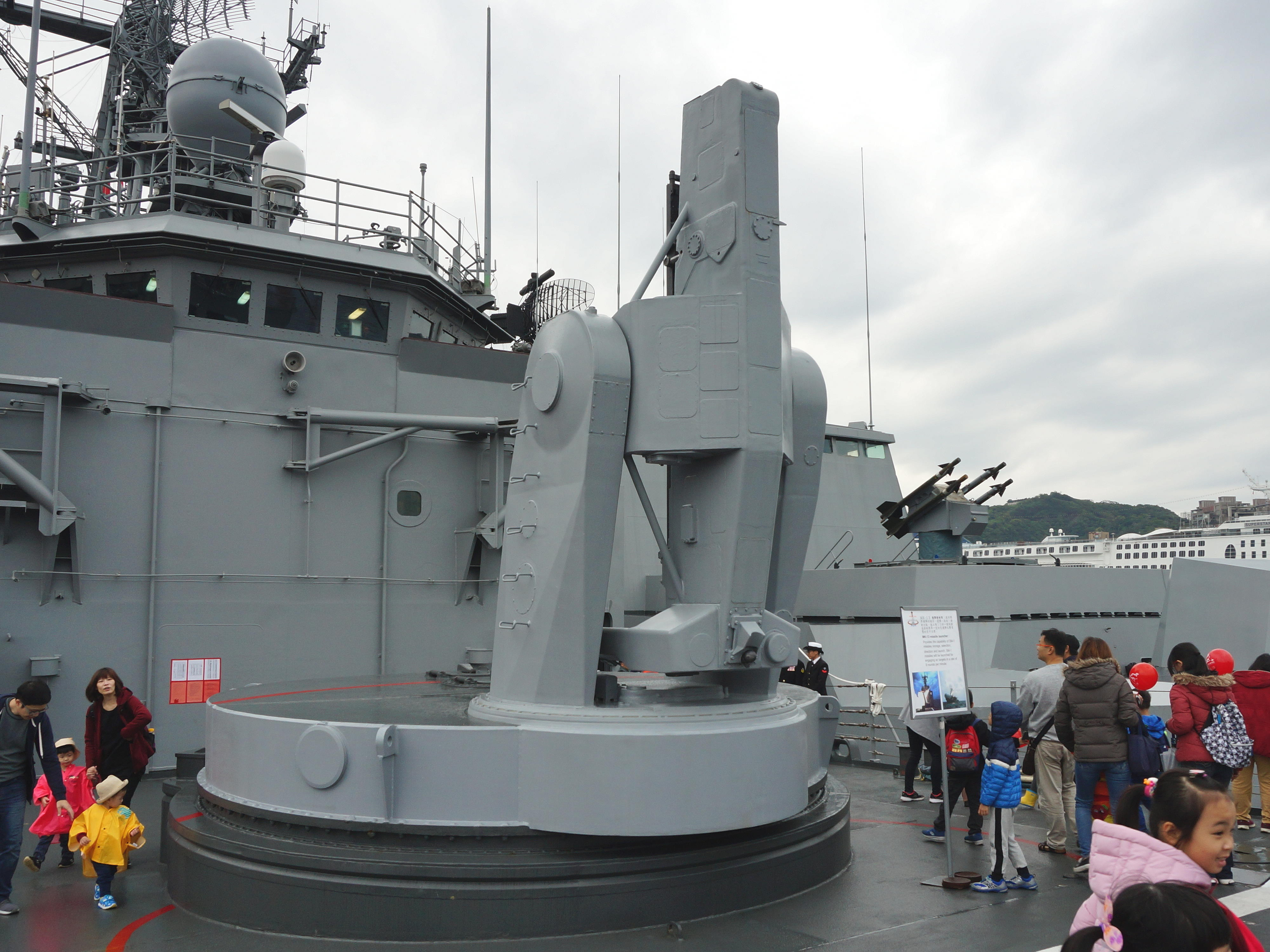
ROCS Tian Dan's Mark 13 launchers

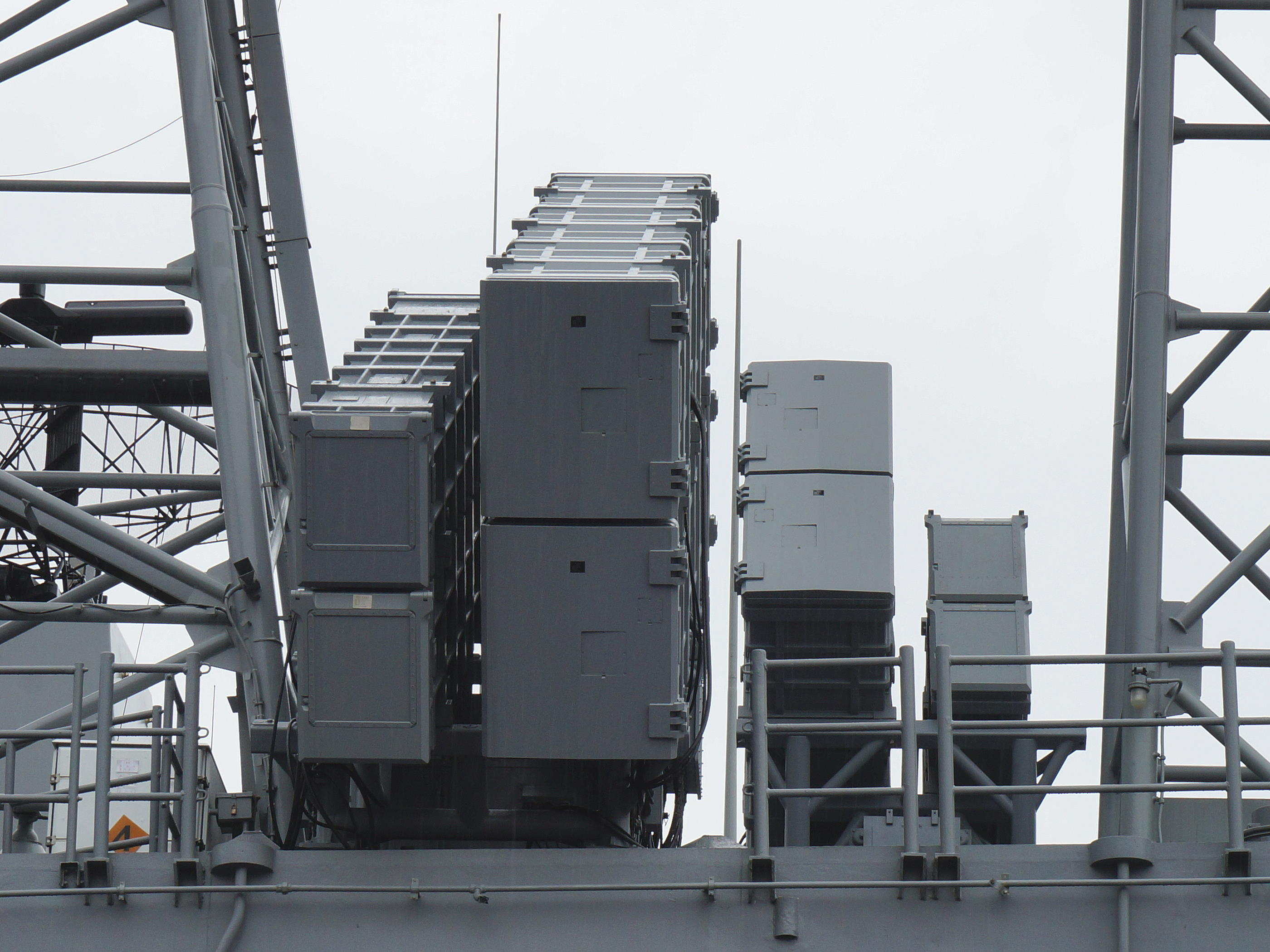
ROCS Tian Dan's Hsiung Feng II and Hsiung Feng III

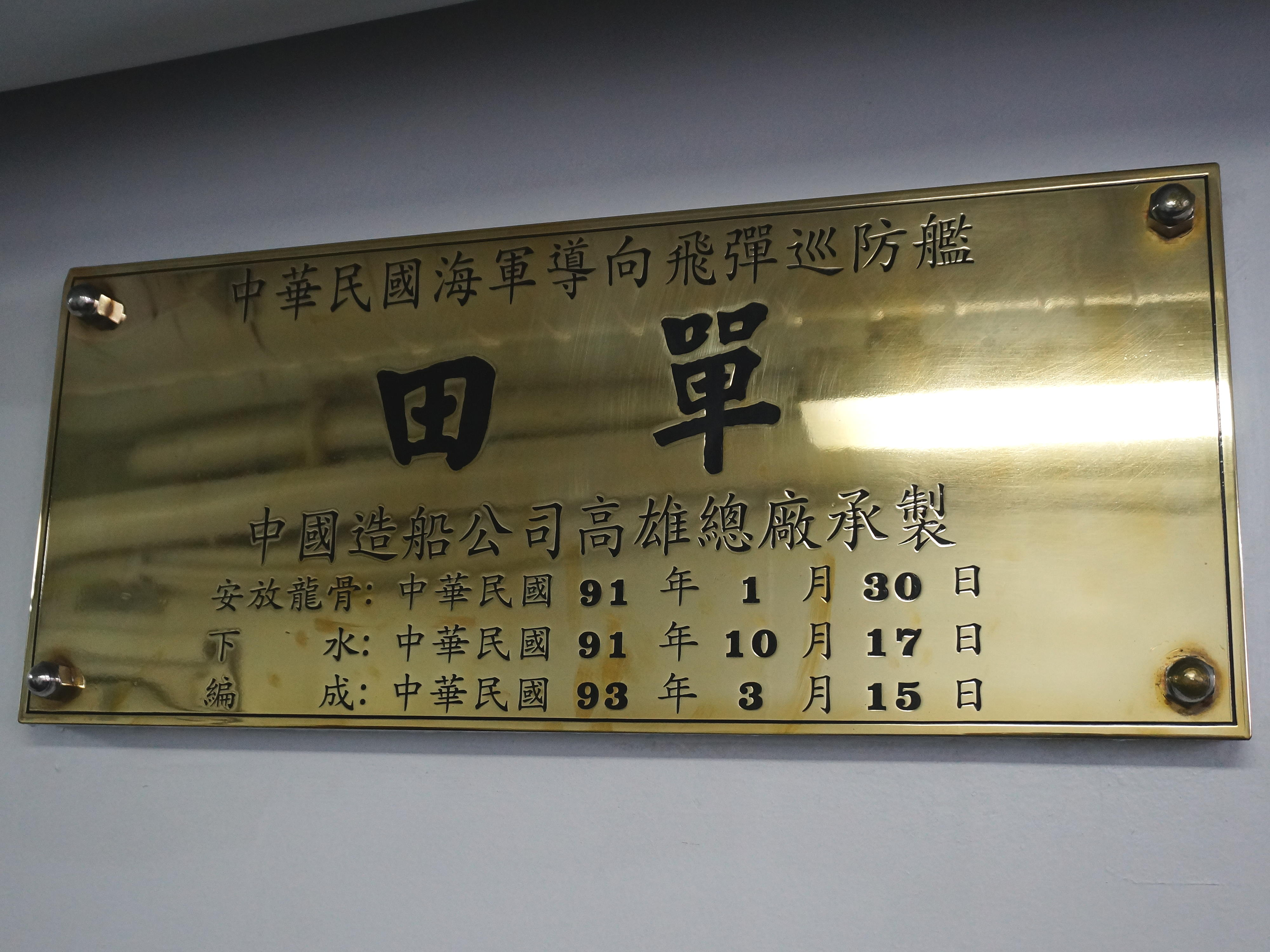
ROCS Tian Dan's nameplate

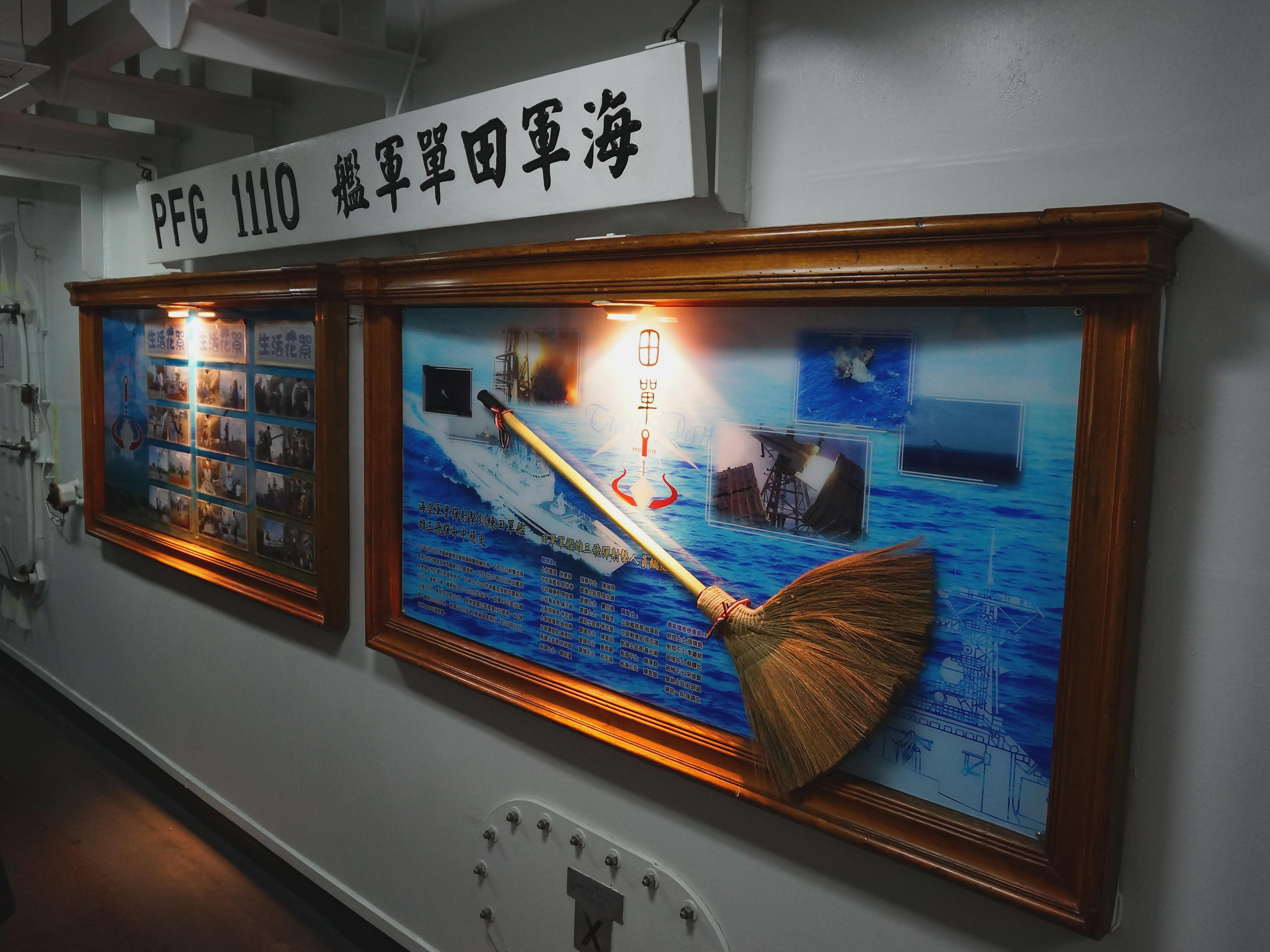
ROCS Tian Dan's bulletin board

== See also ==
- Republic of China Navy
