= Vertical launching system =

Modern system for holding and firing missiles on naval vessels

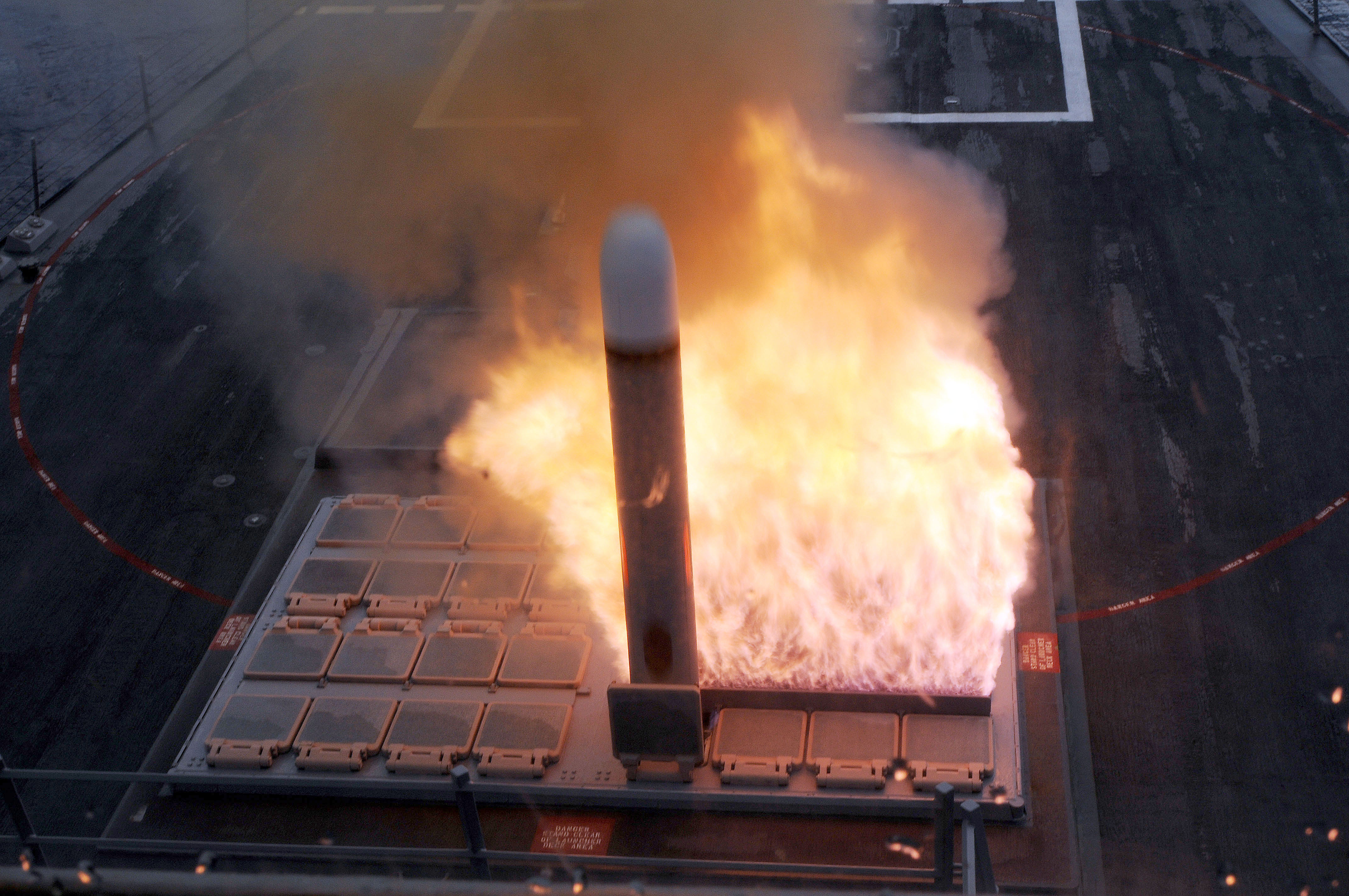
US Navy Mk. 41 VLS launching Tomahawk cruise missile using hot launch method

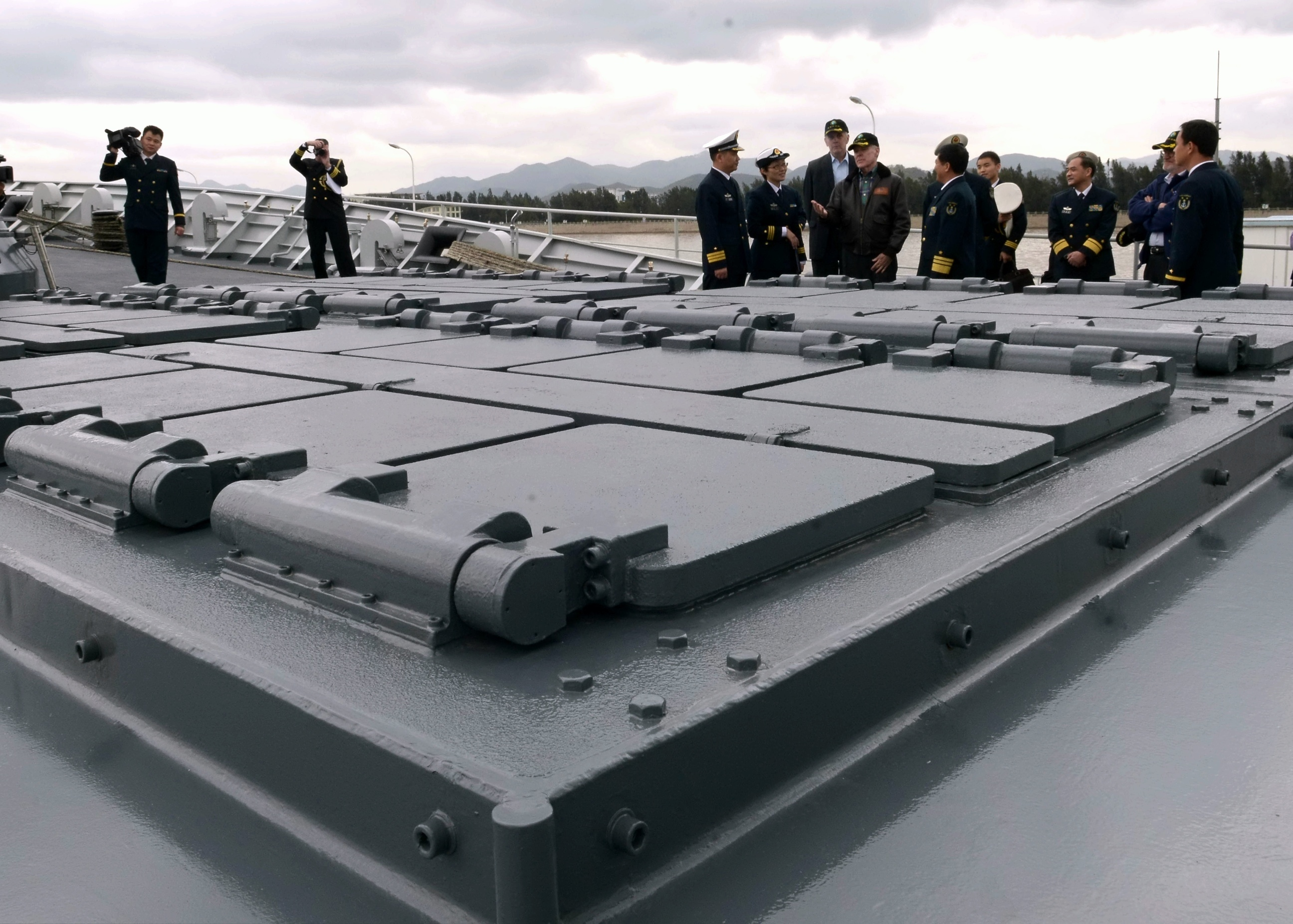
An example of modern Chinese VLS onboard the Chinese frigate Xuzhou

The video shows the launch of the Sea Wolf missile from the VLS cells aboard HMS Richmond

A vertical launching system (VLS) is an advanced system for holding and firing missiles on mobile naval platforms, such as surface ships and submarines. Each vertical launch system consists of a number of cells, which can hold one or more missiles ready for firing. Typically, each cell can hold a number of different types of missiles, allowing the ship flexibility to load the best set for any given mission. Further, when new missiles are developed, they are typically fitted to the existing vertical launch systems of that nation, allowing existing ships to use new types of missiles without expensive rework. When the command is given, the missile flies straight up far enough to clear the cell and the ship, then turns onto the desired course.

A VLS allows surface combatants to have a greater number of weapons ready for firing at any given time compared to older launching systems such as the Mark 13 single-arm and Mark 26 twin-arm launchers, which were fed from behind by a magazine below the main deck. In addition to greater firepower, VLS is much more damage tolerant and reliable than the previous systems and has a lower radar cross-section (RCS). The U.S. Navy now relies exclusively on VLS for its guided missile destroyers and cruisers.

The most widespread VLS in the world is the Mark 41, developed by the United States Navy. More than 11,000 Mark 41 VLS missile cells have been delivered, or are on order, for use on 186 ships across 19 ship classes, in 14 navies around the world. This system currently serves with the US Navy as well as the Australian, Canadian, Danish, Dutch, German, Japanese, Norwegian, South Korean, Spanish, and Turkish navies, while others like the Greek Navy preferred the similar Mark 48 system.

The 3S-14 VLS was developed in Russia and is used in sea-based as well as land-based TEL systems such as the S-400 missile system. MiDLAS vertical launching system is a Turkish system made by Roketsan.

The advanced Mark 57 VLS (an upgrade to the Mark 41) is used on the Zumwalt-class destroyer. The older Mark 13 and Mark 26 systems remain in service on ships that were sold to other countries such as Taiwan and Poland.

When installed on a nuclear-powered attack submarine, a VLS allows a greater number and variety of weapons to be deployed, compared with using only torpedo tubes.

== Launch type ==
A vertical launch system can be either "hot launch", where the missile ignites in the cell, or "cold launch", where the missile is expelled by gas produced by a gas generator which is not part of the missile itself, and then the missile ignites. "Cold" means relatively cold compared with rocket engine exhaust. A hot launch system does not require an ejection mechanism but does require some way of disposing of the missile's exhaust and heat as it departs the cell. If the missile ignites in a cell without an ejection mechanism, the cell must withstand the tremendous heat generated without igniting missiles in adjacent cells.

=== Hot launch ===
A missile launching from the KVLS cell of the Sejong the Great-class destroyer during maritime operations drills

An advantage of a hot-launch system is that the missile propels itself out of the launching cell using its own engine, which eliminates the need for a separate system to eject the missile from the launching tube. This potentially makes a hot-launch system relatively light, small, and economical to develop and produce, particularly when designed around smaller missiles. A potential disadvantage is that a malfunctioning missile could destroy the launch tube. American surface-ship VLSs have missile cells arranged in a grid with one lid per cell and are "hot launch" systems. The engine ignites within the cell during the launch and so requires a way of venting rocket exhaust. France, Italy and Britain use a similar hot-launching Sylver system in PAAMS.

=== Cold launch ===
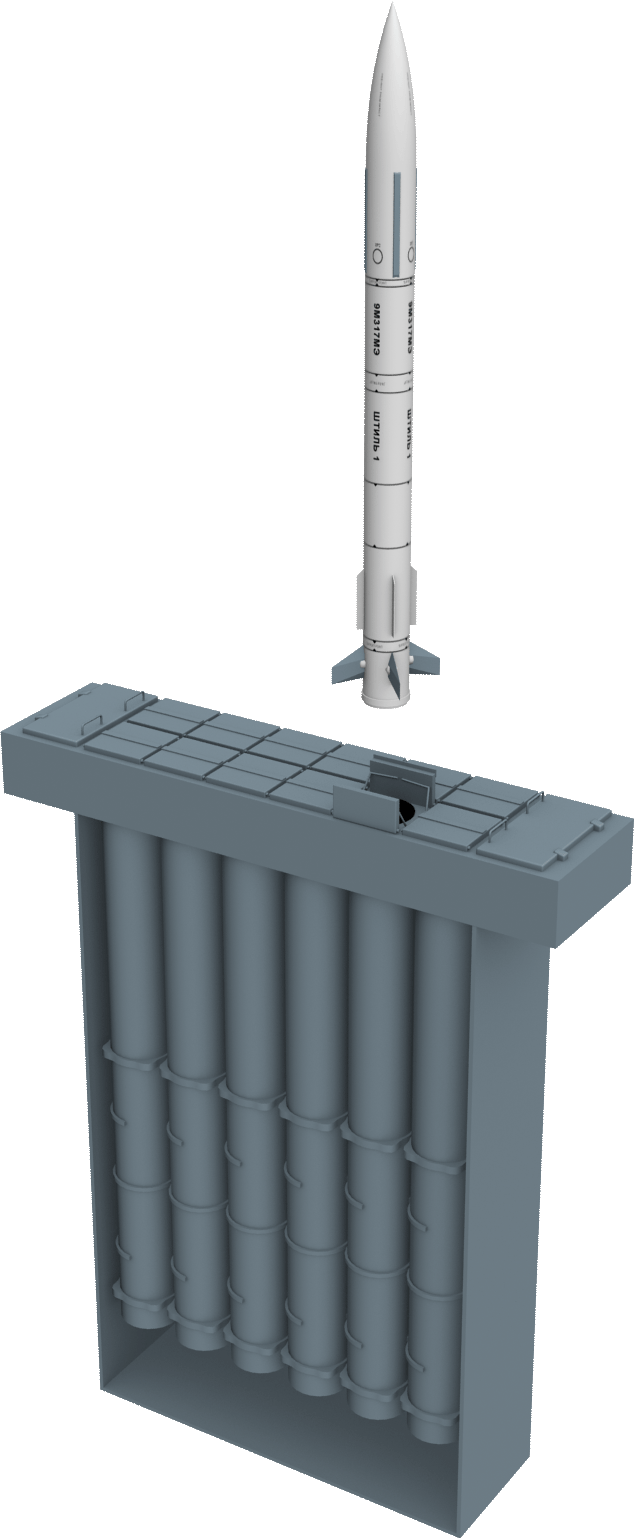
3S90M VLS system used cold launch method to launch 9M317M surface-to-air-missiles

The advantage of the cold-launch system is in its safety: if a missile engine malfunctions during launch, the cold-launch system can eject the missile, reducing or eliminating the threat. For this reason, Russian VLSs are often designed with a slant so that a malfunctioning missile will land in the water instead of on the ship's deck. As missile size grows, the benefits of ejection launching increase. Above a certain size, a missile booster cannot be safely ignited within the confines of a ship's hull. Most modern intercontinental ballistic missiles and submarine-launched ballistic missiles are cold-launched. Russia produces both grid systems and a revolver arrangement with more than one missile per lid for its cold launch system. Russia also uses a cold launch system for some of its vertical launch missile systems, e.g., the Tor missile system.

The United Kingdom's Common Anti-Air Modular Missile (CAMM) family of missiles utilises a similar cold-launching system, referred to as "soft-vertical-launch", and actively markets the advantages of the system. Soft-launch provides the missile with a better minimum interception range,reduces the infrared homing signature of the ship and the obscurant of visibility by rendering the ship in efflux for several minutes; and most notably, the lack of hot efflux and reduced stress on the ship's structure allows for a much greater choice of launch systems, such as the lighter "Mushroom Farm" launcher whilst also still enabling installation into the heavier Mark 41 in a quad-pack or dual-packed configuration (two or four missiles per cell) for a costly, but more space efficient option.

=== Concentric canister launch ===
Some warships of China's People's Liberation Army Navy use a concentric canister launch (CCL) system that can launch using both hot and cold methods in the cell module, onboard the Type 052D destroyer and the Type 055 destroyer. The universal launch system is offered for export.

Older Chinese ships use single launch system: Type 052C destroyers use a cold launch system, while Type 054A frigates use a hot launch system.

== Other platforms ==
Transporter erector launchers are wheeled or tracked land vehicles for the launch of surface-to-air and surface-to-surface missiles. In most systems the missiles are transported in a horizontal out-of-battery configuration: in order to fire, the vehicle must stop and the transport/launch tube must be raised to the vertical before firing.

BAE Systems has filed patents relating to the use of Vertical Launch missiles from modified passenger aircraft.

== List of VLS ==
- VLS with multiple types of missile launching capability:
  - 3S-14 (Russia)
  - GJB 5860-2006 (China)
  - Korean vertical launching system (South Korea)
  - Mark 41 vertical launching system (USA)
  - Mark 48 vertical launching system (USA)
  - Mark 57 vertical launching system (USA)
  - MiDLAS vertical launching system (Turkey)
  - Sylver vertical launching system (France)
  - HY-VLS (Taiwan)
- VLS made for only single model of missile or missile family:
  - GWS 26 vertical launching System (UK)
  - GWS 35 vertical launching System (UK)

== Systems in use by states ==
=== NATO ===
In 2021, the Centre for Military Studies published the total number of VLS cells in use with fourteen NATO navies. The results are displayed below.

Vertical launch system cells of 14 NATO navies in 2020 (Centre for Military Studies)
| Country | Ship classes and approx. number of VLS cells | Total | Strike length VLS cells for sea-launched cruise missiles (SLCM) |
|---|---|---|---|
| United States | 74 × 90/96 Arleigh Burke-class destroyer; 9 × 122 Ticonderoga-class cruiser; 2 × 80 Zumwalt-class destroyer | 8,158 | 8,700+ arsenal of SLCM. VLS and BFM on submarines not included. |
| Europe total | - | 2,392 | 688 |
| United Kingdom | 6 × 48 Type 45 destroyer; 13 × 32 Type 23 frigate | 704 | - |
| France | 2 × 48 Horizon-class frigate; 6 × 32 Aquitaine-class frigate | 288 | 6 × 16 = 96 SLCM deployed on Aquitaine class |
| Denmark | 2 × 36 Absalon-class support ship; 3 × 56 Iver Huitfeldt-class frigate | 240 | 3 x 32 = 96 / No SLCM |
| Spain | 5 × 48 Álvaro de Bazán-class frigate | 240 | 5 × 48 = 240 / No SLCM |
| Italy | 2 × 48 Orizzonte-class frigate; 10 × 16 Carlo Bergamini-class frigate; 4 x 16 Thaon di Revel-class ocean patrol vessel | 320 | No SLCM |
| Canada | 12 × 16 Halifax-class frigate | 192 | - |
| Netherlands | 4 × 40 De Zeven Provinciën-class frigate; 2 × 16 Karel Doorman-class frigate | 192 | 4 × 40 = 160 / No SLCM |
| Germany | 4 × 16 Brandenburg-class frigate; 3 × 32 Sachsen-class frigate | 160 | 3 × 32 = 96 / No SLCM |
| Turkey | 2 × 8 Barbaros-class frigate; 2 × 32 Salih Reis-class frigate; 4 × 8 G-class frigate | 122 | - |
| Greece | 4 × 16 Hydra-class frigate | 64 | - |
| Norway | 3 × 8, 1 × 16 Fridtjof Nansen-class frigate | 40 | - |
| Belgium | 2 × 16 Karel Doorman-class frigate | 32 | - |
| Portugal | 2 × 16 Karel Doorman-class frigate | 32 | - |

Note: The above table does not include NATO navies which do not possess vertical launching systems, namely Albania, Croatia, Estonia, Iceland, Latvia, Lithuania, North Macedonia, Poland, Romania and Slovenia.

=== Other ===
Algeria

- El Radii-class frigates – Umkhonto (32 cells)

Australia

- Anzac-class frigate – Mark 41 Mod 16 (8 cells)
- Hobart-class destroyer – Mark 41 (48 cells)
- Hunter-class frigate – Mark 41 (32 cells)

Brazil

- Tamandaré-class frigate – GWS-35 (12 cells)

Chile

- Karel Doorman-class frigate – Mark 48 Mod 1 (16 cells)
- Type 23 frigate – GWS-35 (32 cells)
- Adelaide-class frigate – Mark 41 Mod 16 (8 cells)

China
Surface

As of 2025, PLAN has an arsenal of 4864+ ship-based VLS. VLS on submarines not included.

- Type 055 destroyer – GJB 5860-2006 Concentric Canister Launch System (112 cells)
- Type 052D destroyer – GJB 5860-2006 Concentric Canister Launch System (64 cells)
- Type 052C destroyer – H/AJK-03 HHQ-9 (48 cells)
- Type 051C destroyer – 48N6E (48 cells)
- Type 051B destroyer – H/AKJ-16 (32 cells)
- Sovremenny-class destroyer – H/AKJ-16 (32 cells)
- Type 054B frigate – H/AKJ-16 (32 cells)
- Type 054A frigate – H/AKJ-16 (32 cells)

Egypt

- Tahya Misr – SYLVER A43 (16 cells)

Republic of China

- Kang Ding-class frigate – HY-VLS (32 cells)

Finland

- Hamina-class missile boat – Umkhonto (8 cells)
- Hämeenmaa-class minelayer – Umkhonto (8 cells)

India

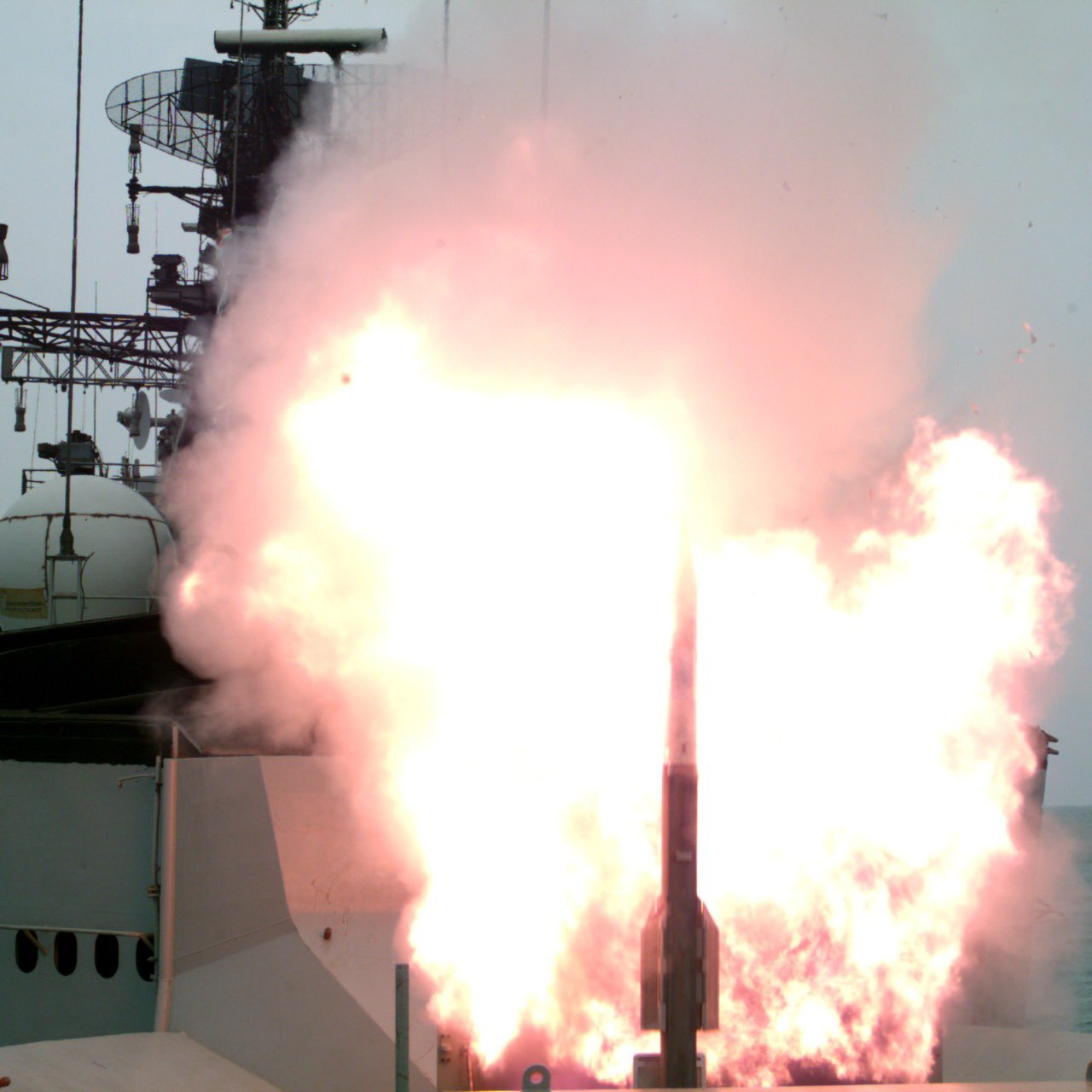
Shipborne launch of VL-SRSAM

Surface (32 ships with 1,040 cells)

- INS Vikrant – Barak 8 (64 cells)
- INS Vikramaditya – Barak 1 and Barak 8 (48 cells)
- Visakhapatnam-class destroyer (4) – BrahMos (16 cells) and Barak 8 (32 cells)
- Kolkata-class destroyer (3) – BrahMos (16 cells) and Barak 8 (32 cells)
- Delhi-class destroyer (3) – Barak 1 (32 cells)
- Rajput-class destroyer (3) – BrahMos (8 cells) and VL-SRSAM or Barak 1 (16 cells)
- Nilgiri-class frigate (3) – BrahMos (8 cells) and Barak 8 (32 cells)
- Shivalik-class frigate (3) – Club or BrahMos (8 cells) and Barak 1 (32 cells)
- Talwar-class frigate (Batch III) (2) – BrahMos (8 cells) and Shtil-1 (24 cells)
- Talwar-class frigate (Batch I & II) (6) – Club or BrahMos (8 cells)
- Brahmaputra-class frigate (3) – Barak 1 (24 cells)

Submarine

- Arihant-class submarine (2) – K-4 or K-15 (4 cells)

Iran

- Shahid Soleimani-class corvette – SD-3 or Navvab and Q-474 CMs (22 cells)
- Zulfighar-class fast attack craft – Navvab (4 cells)

Indonesia

- Bung Tomo-class corvette – VL MICA (16 cells)
- Martadinata-class frigate – VL MICA (12 cells)
- Ahmad Yani-class frigate – Yakhont VLS (4 cells) Ex-Van Speijk-class frigate

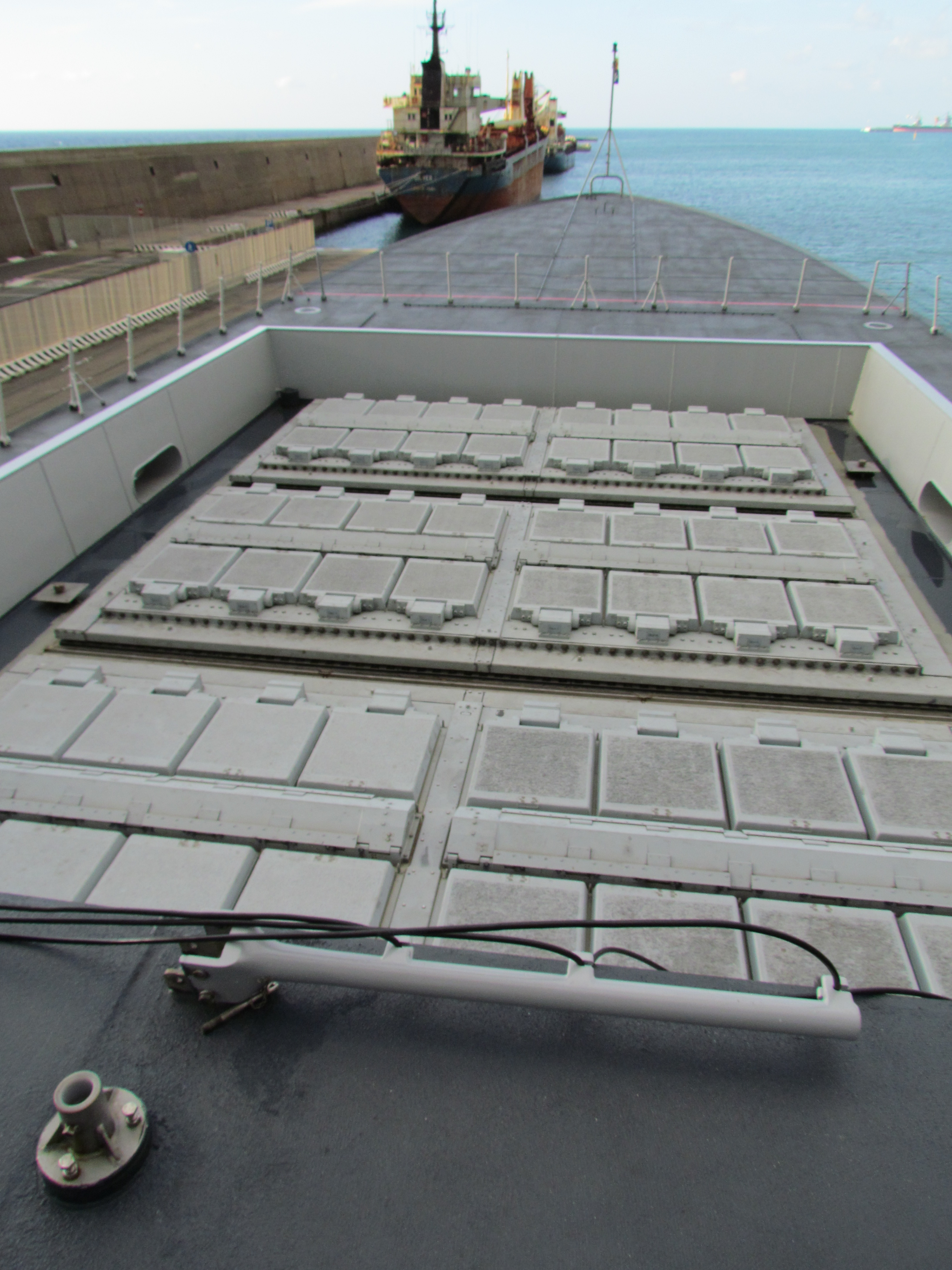
SYLVER cells of the Italian destroyer Caio Duilio

Israel

- Sa'ar 5 – Sa'ar 6 – Barak 1 Barak 8 (2 x 32 cells)

Japan

- Hyūga-class helicopter destroyer – Mark 41 (16 cells)
- Kongō-class destroyer – Mark 41 (90 cells)
- Atago-class destroyer – Mark 41 (96 cells)
- Maya-class destroyer – Mark 41 (96 cells)
- Murasame-class destroyer – Mark 41 (16 cells) + Mark 48 (16 cells)
- Takanami-class destroyer – Mark 41 (32 cells)
- Akizuki-class destroyer – Mark 41 (32 cells)
- Asahi-class destroyer – Mark 41 (32 cells)
- Mogami-class frigate - Mark 41 (16 cells)
- Asuka - Mark 41 (8 cells)

Malaysia

- Lekiu-class frigate - GWS-26 (16 cells)

Morocco

- Mohammed VI – SYLVER A50 (16 cells)

New Zealand

- Anzac-class frigate – GWS-35 (20 cells)

Oman

- Khareef-class corvette – VL MICA (12 cells)

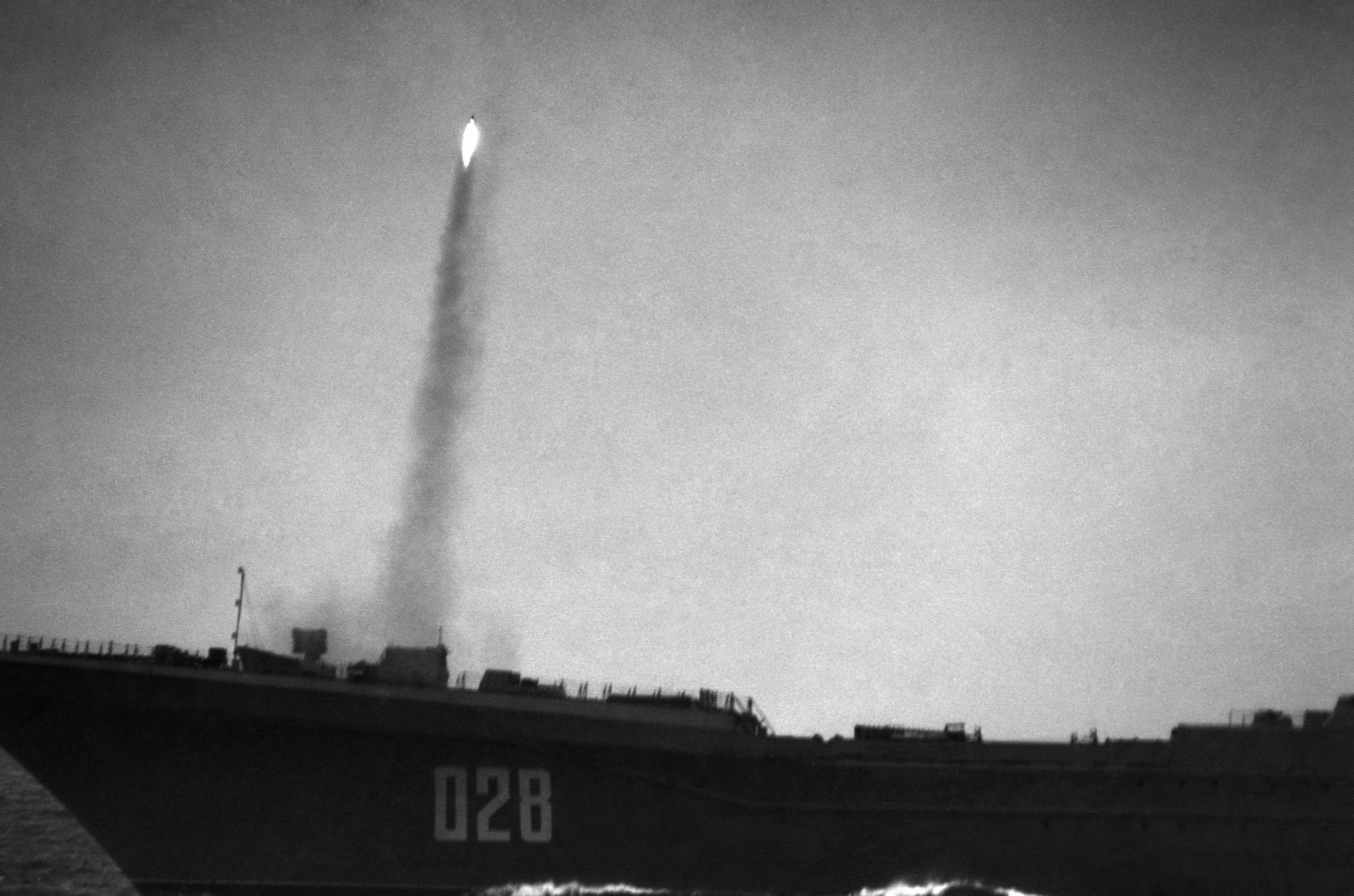
Soviet missile cruiser Frunze firing a missile from the Tor VLS

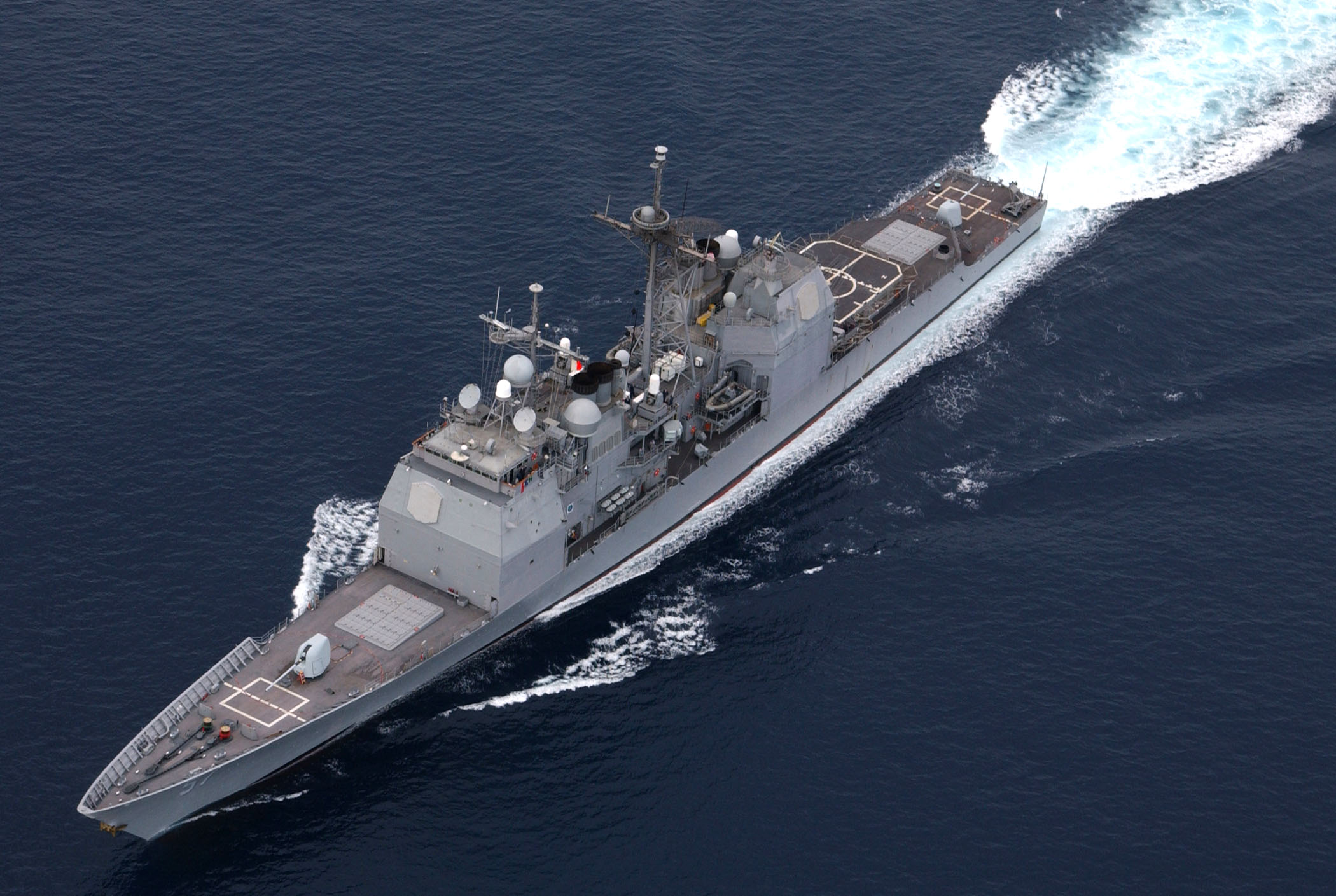
Top view of the Ticonderoga-class USS Lake Champlain with VLS visible fore and aft as the gray boxes near the bow and stern of the ship

Pakistan

- Tughril class – HQ16 (32 cells)
- Babur-class corvette – GWS-35 (12 cells)

Philippines

- Miguel Malvar-class frigate - MICA (16 cells)

Russia
Surface

- Kuznetsov-class aircraft carrier – Granit (Note: P-700 Granits were fired from an angled system (therefore not truly vertical in practice), however referred to as vertical. (See the Cold launch section)) (12 cells) + Kinzhal (192 cells)
- Kirov-class battlecruiser – Granit (20 cells) + Fort/Fort-M (96 cells) + Kinzhal (128 cells)
- Kirov-class battlecruiser Admiral Nakhimov – 3S14 for Kalibr, Oniks, or Zircon (80 cells) + S-400 (96 cells)
- Slava-class cruiser – Fort (64 cells)
- Udaloy-class destroyer – Kinzhal (64 cells)
- Udaloy-class destroyer Marshal Shaposhnikov – 3S14 for Kalibr or Oniks (16 cells) +Kinzhal (64 cells)
- Neustrashimy-class frigate – Kinzhal (32 cells)
- Admiral Grigorovich-class frigate – 3S14 for Kalibr or BrahMos (8 cells) + 3S90M for 9M317M (24 cells)
- Admiral Gorshkov-class frigate – 3S14 for Kalibr, Oniks, or Zircon (16 cells) + Redut system for different type of missiles (32 cells)
- Gepard-class frigate – 3S14 for Kalibr or Oniks (8 cells)
- Steregushchiy-class corvette – Redut (12 cells)
- Gremyashchiy-class corvette – Redut (2 x 8 cells) + 3S14 for Kalibr or Oniks ( 8 cells)
- Buyan-M-class corvette – 3S14 for Kalibr or Oniks (8 cells)
- Karakurt-class corvette – 3S14 for Kalibr or Oniks (8 cells)
- Project 22160E patrol ship – 3S14 for Kalibr or Oniks (8 cells)
- Korsar-class escort ship – 3S14 for Kalibr (8 cells)

Submarine

- Amur 950-class submarine – 3S14 for Kalibr or BrahMos (10 cells)
- Oscar-class submarine – Granit (24 cells) + RPK-2 Vyuga (28 cells)
- Yasen-M-class submarine – 3S14 for Kalibr, Oniks, or Zircon (Note: Sources claim that the Zircon missile was installed via refit/modification on Severodvinsk and Kazan, and that the first submarine designed from inception to carry Zircons is the Perm, the fifth boat of the class) (32 cells (Note: These submarines' VLS design slightly differs from other iterations of the 3S14. The Yasen and Yasen-M-class submarines are equipped with 8 missile silos. Each silo has the capability to carry 5 Kalibr missiles and 4 Oniks missiles, with either 4 or 5 spots for Zircon on certain boats.))
- Typhoon-class submarine – R-39 Rif (20 cells)
- Delta III-class submarine – R-29 Vysota (16 cells)
- Delta IV-class submarine – R-29RMU Sineva or R-29RM Shtil (16 cells)
- Borei-class submarine – RSM-56 Bulava (16 cells)

Saudi Arabia

- Al Jubail-class corvette -Mark 41 (16 Cells)

South Africa

- Valour-class frigate – Umkhonto (16 cells)

South Korea

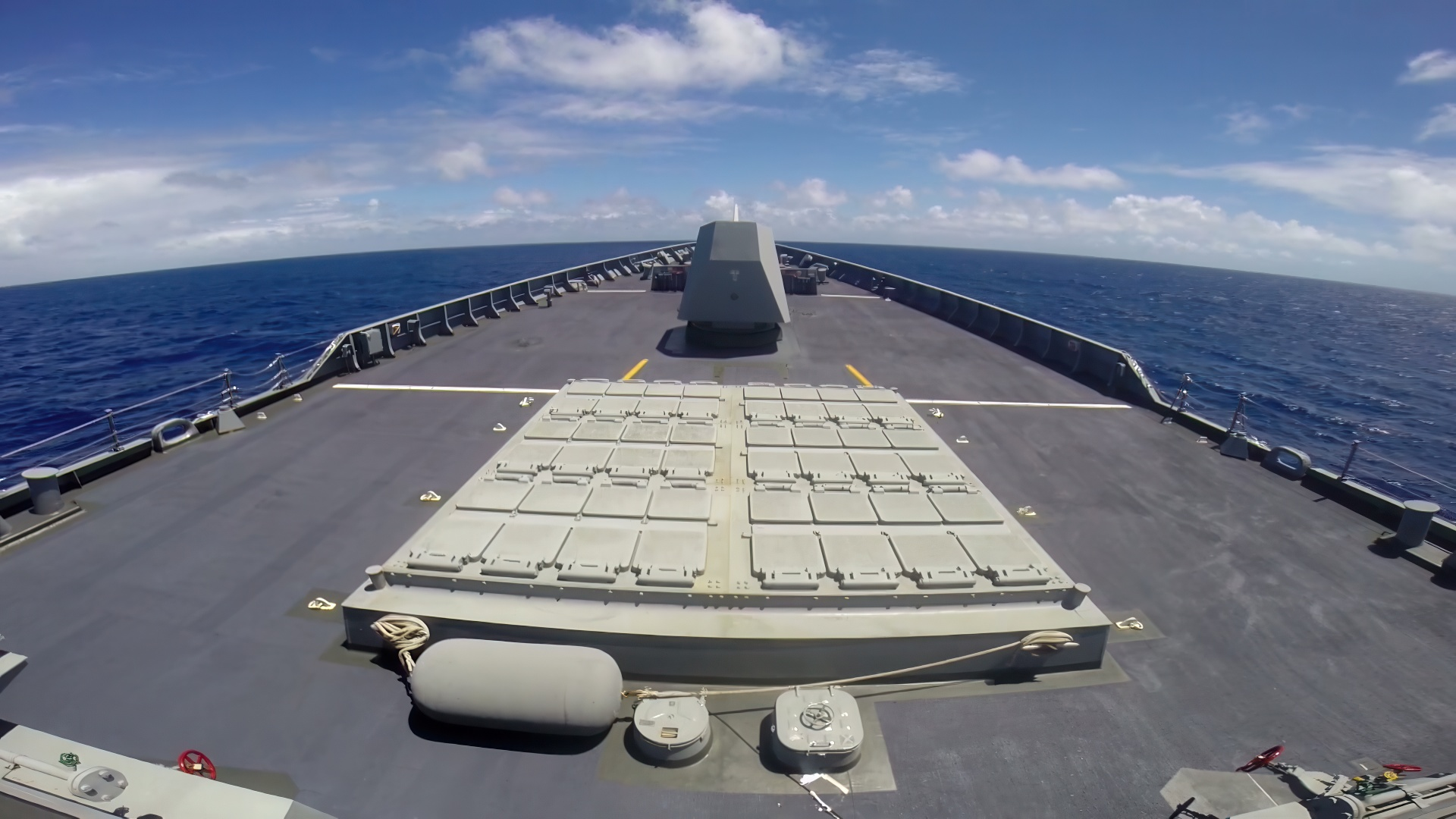
8-cell KVLS modules on board a Sejong the Great-class destroyer

Surface

- Gwanggaeto the Great-class destroyer (KDX-I) – Mark 48 (16 cells)
- Chungmugong Yi Sun-shin-class destroyer (KDX-II) – Mark 41 (32 cells) + Korean Vertical Launching System (K-VLS) (24 cells / 32 cells)
- Sejong the Great-class destroyer (KDX-III) – Mark 41 (80 cells) + K-VLS (48 cells)
- Nampo-class minelayer – K-VLS (4 cells)
- Cheon Wang Bong-class landing ship – K-VLS (4 cells)
- Daegu-class frigate – K-VLS (16 cells)

Submarine

- Dosan Ahn Changho-class submarine – K-VLS (10 cells)

Singapore

- Formidable-class frigate – SYLVER (32 cells)
- Victory-class corvette – Barak 1 (2 x 8 cells)
- Independence-class littoral mission vessel – VL MICA-M (12 cells)

Thailand

- Naresuan-class frigate – Mark 41 (8 cells)
- Bhumibol Adulyadej-class frigate – Mark 41 (8 cells)

== Gallery ==
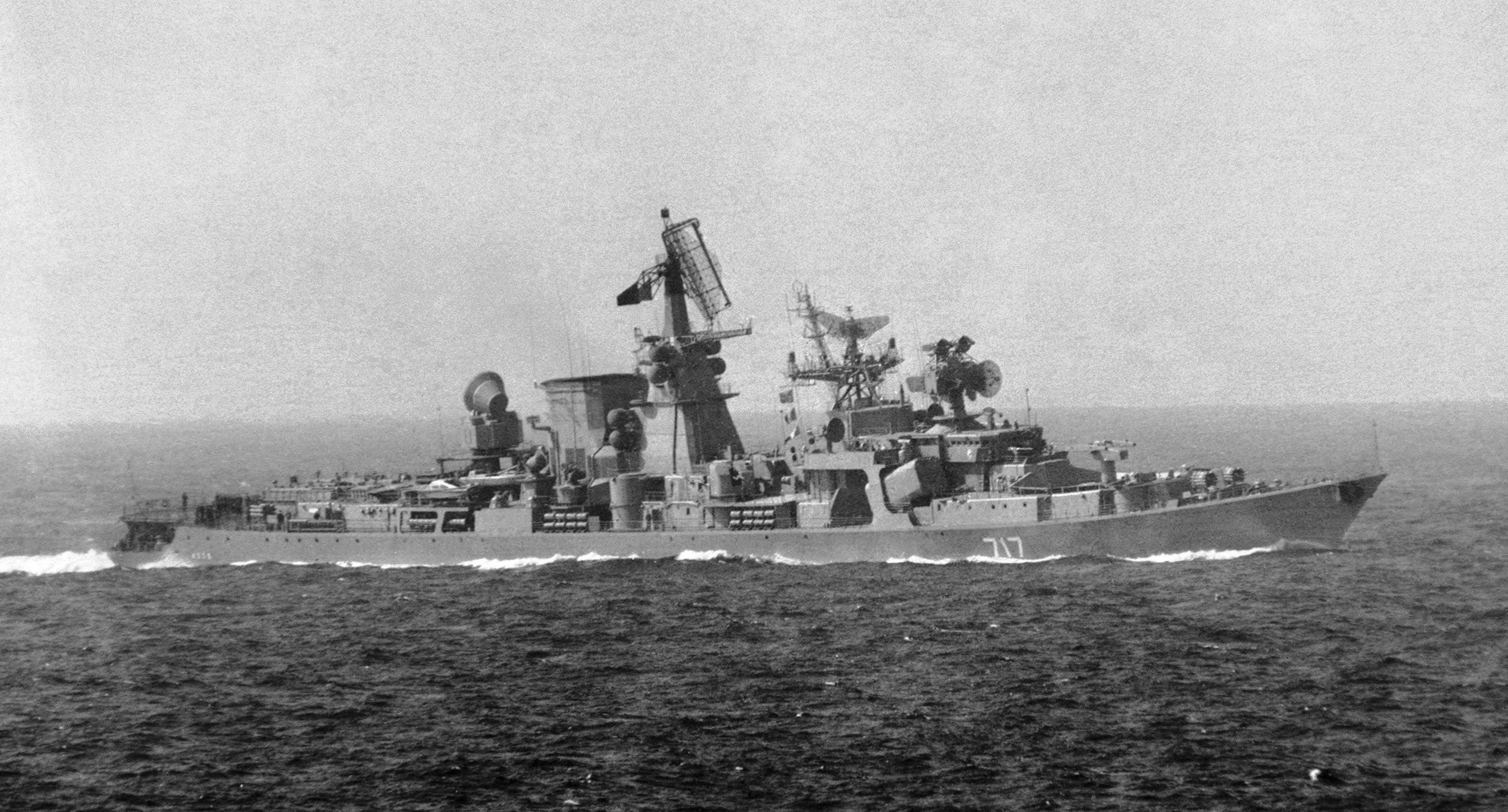
The Kara-class cruiser Azov was the first surface ship to be fitted with a true, 90° VLS. The system in question contained four revolving drums of 48 tubes for 5V55RM missiles

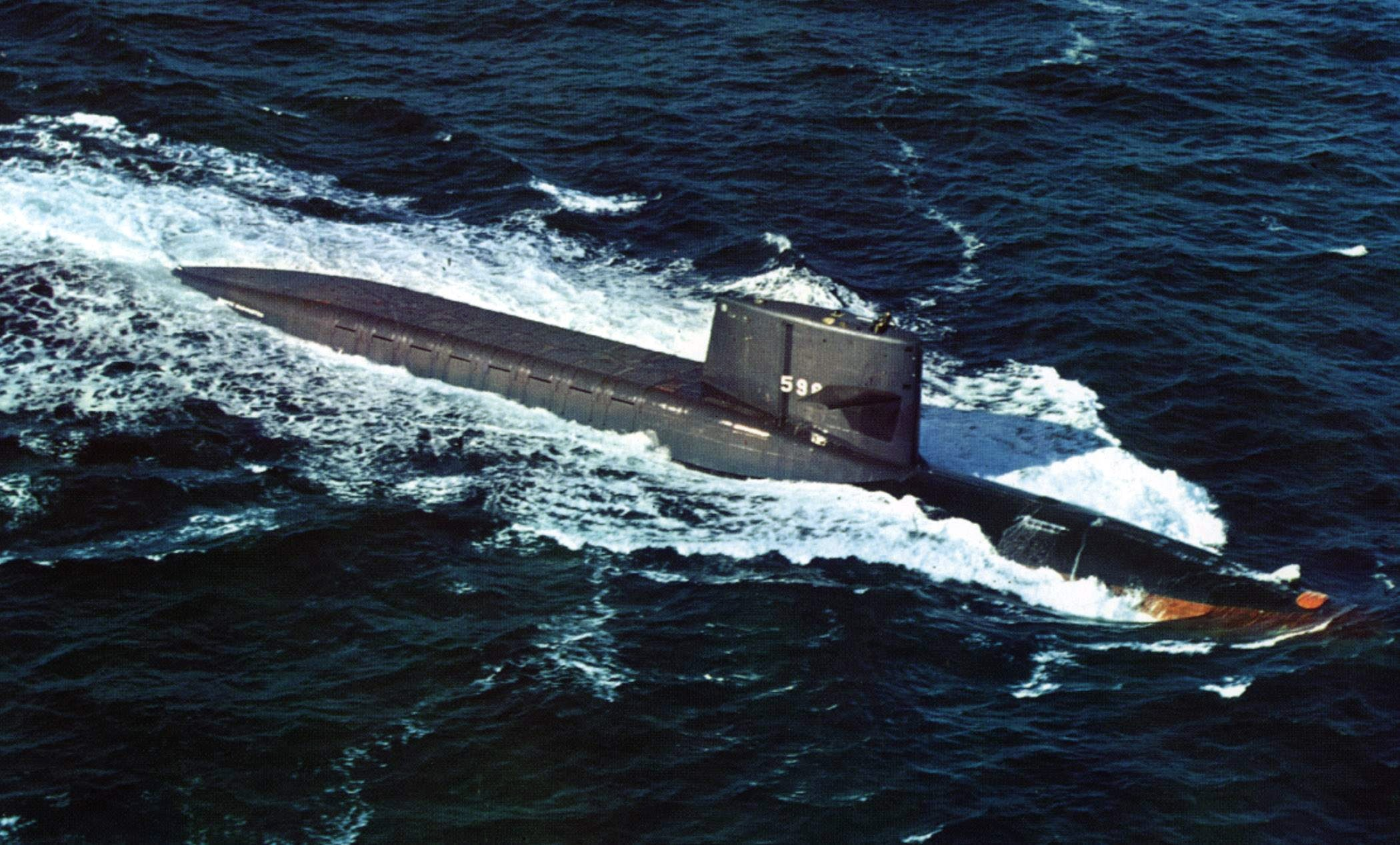
In December 1959, the U.S. Navy commissioned USS George Washington as its first ballistic missile submarine, making it the first VLS-equipped submarine in the world to use nuclear rather than diesel propulsion.

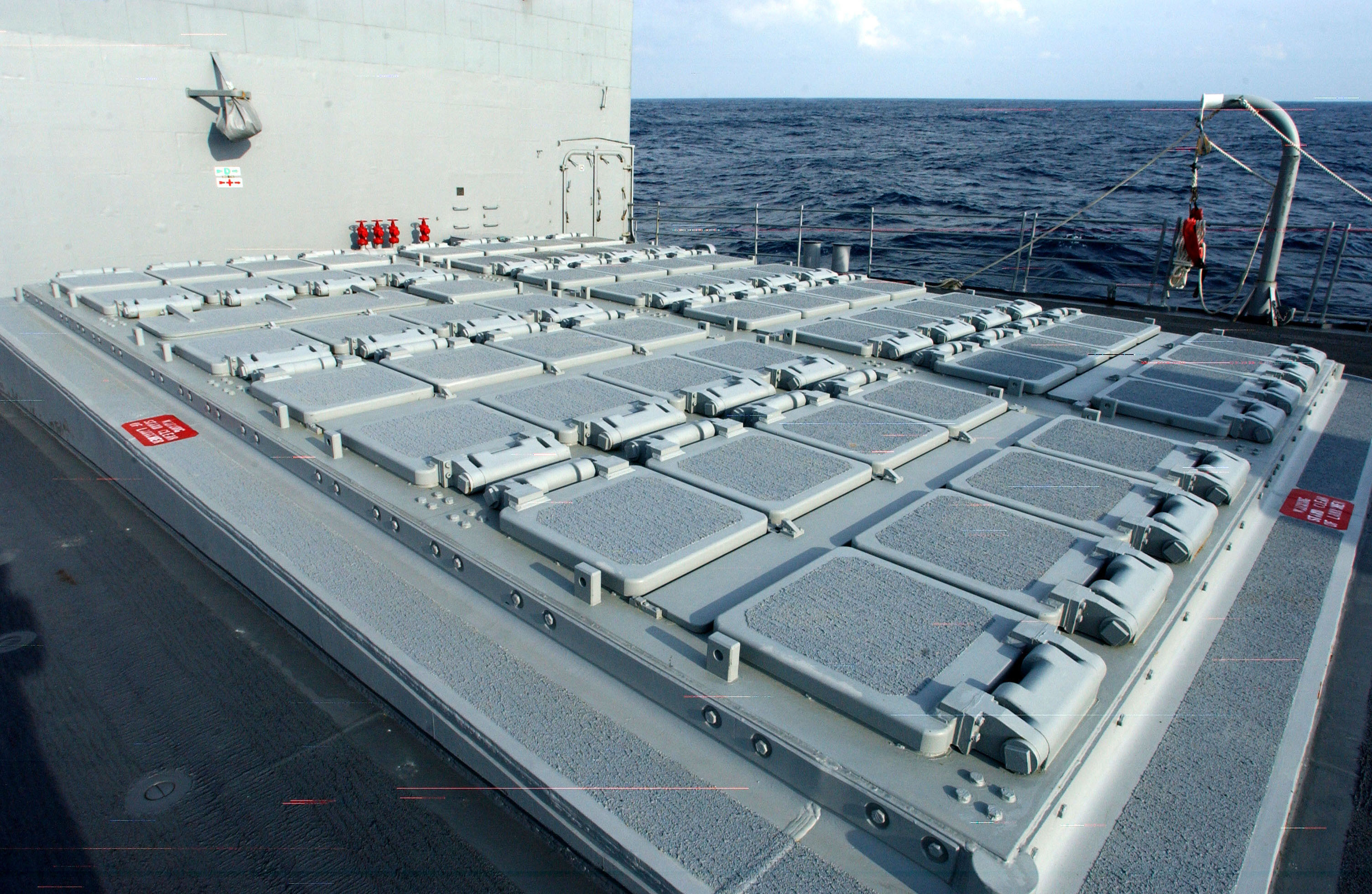
An example of modern VLS cells, these being the Mk. 41, on board USS San Jacinto

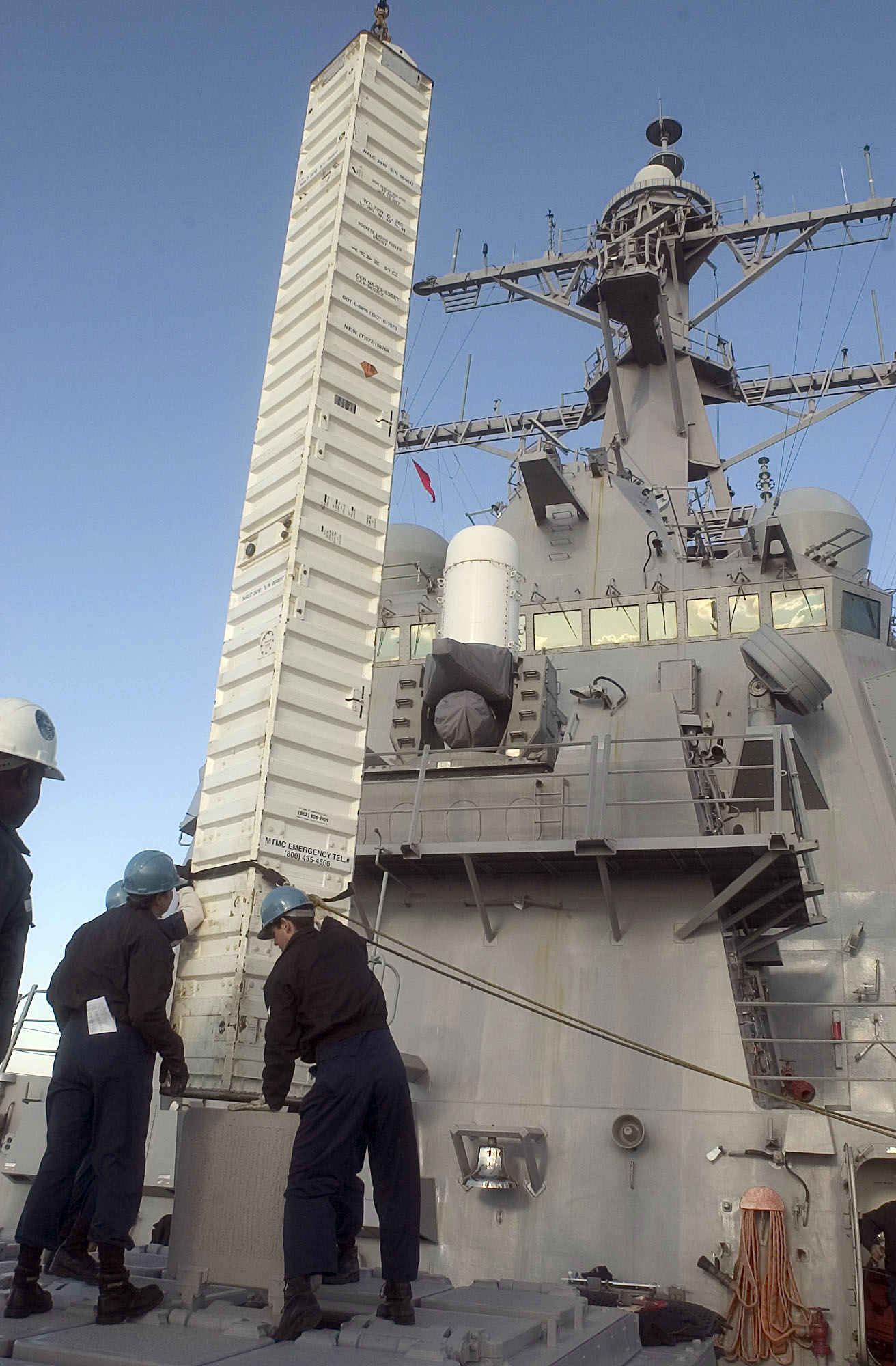
A Tomahawk missile canister being offloaded from a VLS aboard the Arleigh Burke-class destroyer USS Curtis Wilbur

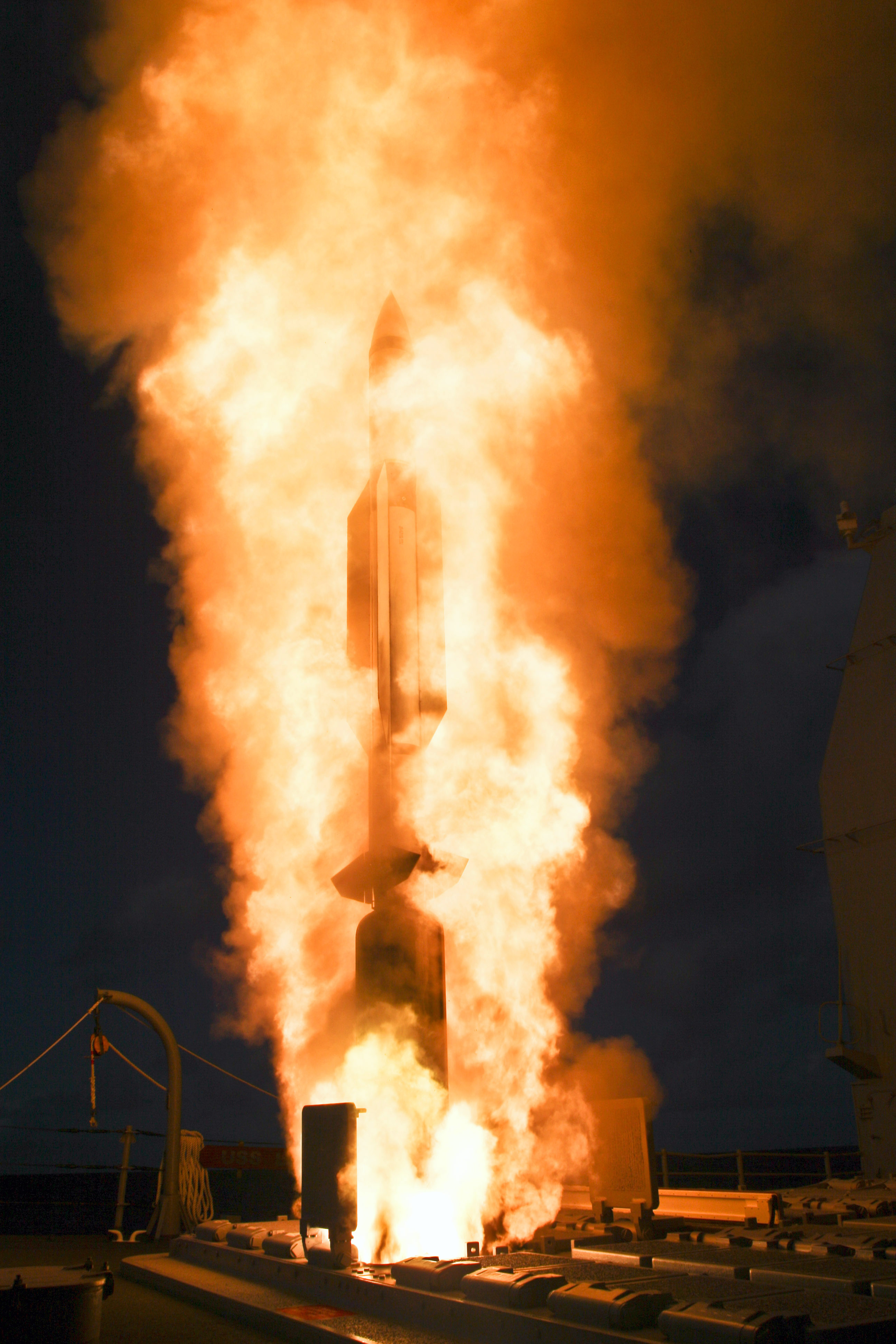
RIM-156A missile launching from a VLS cell on USS Lake Erie in 2008

== See also ==
- List of United States Navy Guided Missile Launching Systems
- XM501 Non-Line-of-Sight Launch System, an experimental small land and surface VLS
