= Type 054B frigate =

Class of Chinese guided-missile frigates

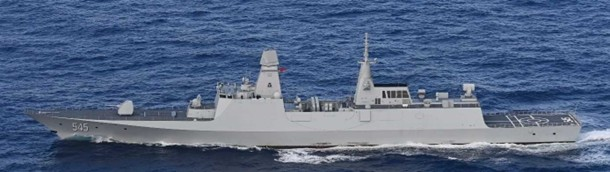
- Luohe (545) in 2026

Class overview
- Builders: Hudong-Zhonghua Shipyard; Huangpu Shipyard
- Operators: People's Liberation Army Navy
- Preceded by: Type 054A frigate
- Building: 2
- Active: 2

General characteristics
- Type: Frigate
- Displacement: Estimated 5,500 to 6,000 tons (full)
- Length: Around 150 m (490 ft) (estimated)
- Beam: Around 17 m (56 ft) (estimated)
- Propulsion: CODAD, 4 × CS16V27 diesels, 29.12 MW (39,050 hp) total, 2 shafts
- Speed: 28 knots
- Range: 5,000 nautical miles (5,800 mi; 9,300 km)
- Armament: 1 × 100 mm gun PJE-087B; 1 × 30 mm H/PJ-11 11-barrel gun-based CIWS; 1 × HHQ-10 SAM-based CIWS; 8 × Anti-ship missiles; A total of 32 (4 × 8-cell) H/AKJ-16 VLS for the first two ships and a total of 48 (6 × 8-cell) H/AKJ-16 VLS from the third ship onward; HHQ-16 SAM; Yu-8 anti-submarine missile; 2 × 3 324mm ASW torpedo launchers
- Aircraft carried: 1x Harbin Z-20 family helicopter
- Aviation facilities: Hangar

The Type 054B (NATO/OSD Jiangkai III) is a class of multirole guided-missile frigate of the People's Republic of China. It is a development of the Type 054A frigate, and is around 15 m (49 ft) longer and 1 m (3 ft 3 in) wider than its predecessor. Compared to the Type 054A frigate, the extra length allows the Type 054B frigate to install SAM-based CIWS along with the gun-based CIWS, a heavier main gun and carry a heavier helicopter. The sensors are also upgraded, including a new radar. The Type 054AG frigate, the latest variant of the Type 054A, has some similarities with the Type 054B, including the main gun and helicopter.

== Development ==
In the 2010s, Chinese military observers speculated a successor design to Type 054A frigate, designated Type 054B or Type 057. In the early 2020s, more confident intelligence suggested the successor to Type 054A would be the Type 054B. The first two hulls were laid down in 2022 at the Hudong shipyard and the Huangpu shipyard in Shanghai and launched in 2023. The first frigate, Luohe was commissioned on 22 January 2025 at Qingdao.

The second ship in its class, Qinzhou, was secretly commissioned, with its existence confirmed on April 12, 2025. Two additional vessels are currently under construction. Satellite imageries captured by Vantor around August 2026 indicates that the latter ships have an increased missile capacity, being equipped with six eight-cell vertical launching system instead of four for the first two vessels.

== Design ==
The Type 054B is longer and wider than the Type 054A. A dual-face rotating AESA radar is mounted on the top of the forward integrated mast. The stern has a panel for variable depth sonar and ports for deploying towed sonars and decoys.

Armament includes a 100mm H/PJ-87 main gun, a 32-cell vertical launching system (H/AKJ-16), a Type 1130 11-barrel 30mm close in weapon system, and a HHQ-10 air defense missile launcher.

The helicopter pad is large enough to accommodate the Harbin Z-20.

== Operational history ==
On 27 May 2026, Japan confirmed the first known deployment of a Type 054B frigate, where it was part of a carrier strike group of the Chinese navy. The vessel was spotted as part of a group in the Western Pacific which included the Chinese aircraft carrier Liaoning.

== Ships of class ==
Pennant number	Name	Namesake	Builder	Launched	Commissioned	Fleet	Status
545	漯河 / Luohe	City of Luohe	Hudong-Zhonghua Shipyard	August 26, 2023	January 22, 2025	North Sea Fleet	Active
555	钦州 / Qinzhou	City of Qinzhou	Huangpu Shipyard	October 29, 2023	April 23, 2025	South Sea Fleet	Active

== See also ==
- List of frigate classes in service
- List of ships of the People's Liberation Army Navy

Equivalent frigates of the same era

- Constellation class
- FFM
- Chungnam class
- Type 31
- Thaon di Revel class
- FDI
- Nilgiri class
