= Chinese frigate Xuzhou =

Type 054A frigate of the PLA Navy

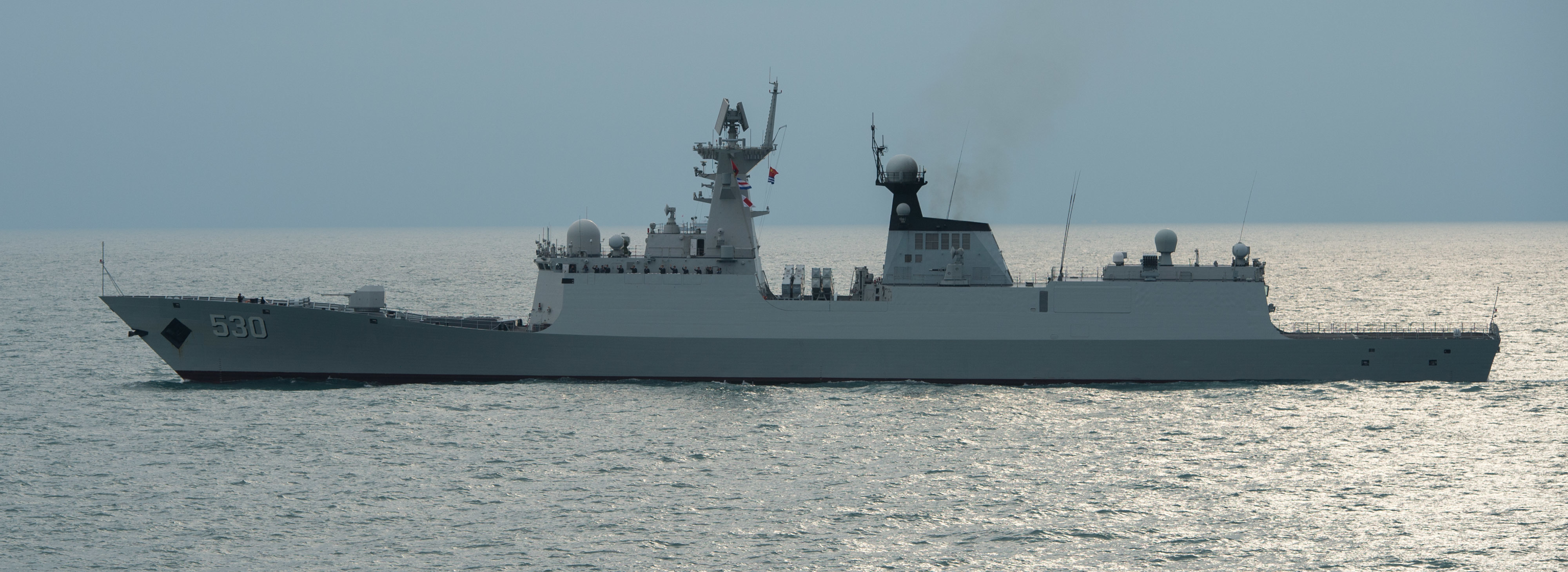
- Xuzhou underway on 19 November 2015

History

China
- Name: Xuzhou
- Namesake: Xuzhou; (徐州)
- Builder: Huangpu, Shanghai
- Launched: July 2007
- Commissioned: 27 January 2008
- Identification: Pennant number: 530
- Status: Active
- Badge: See #Emblem

General characteristics
- Class & type: Type 054A frigate
- Displacement: 4,053 tonnes (full)
- Length: 134.1 m (440 ft)
- Beam: 16 m (52 ft)
- Propulsion: CODAD, 4 × Shaanxi 16 PA6 STC diesels, 5700 kW (7600+ hp @ 1084 rpm) each
- Speed: 27 knots estimated
- Range: 8,025 nautical miles (9,235 mi; 14,862 km) estimated
- Complement: 165
- Sensors & processing systems: Type 382 Radar; Type 344 Radar (Mineral-ME Band Stand) OTH target acquisition and SSM fire control radar; 4 × Type 345 Radar(MR-90 Front Dome) SAM fire control radars; MR-36A surface search radar, I-band; Type 347G 76 mm gun fire control radar; 2 × Racal RM-1290 navigation radars, I-band; MGK-335 medium frequency active/passive sonar system; H/SJG-206 towed array sonar; ZKJ-4B/6 (developed from Thomson-CSF TAVITAC) combat data system; HN-900 Data link (Chinese equivalent of Link 11A/B, to be upgraded); SNTI-240 SATCOM; AKD5000S Ku band SATCOM
- Electronic warfare & decoys: Type 922-1 radar warning receiver; HZ-100 ECM & ELINT system; Kashtan-3 missile jamming system
- Armament: 1 × 32-cell VLS; HQ-16 SAM; Yu-8 anti submarine rocket launcher; 2 × 4 C-803 anti-ship / land attack cruise missiles; 1 × PJ26 76 mm dual-purpose gun; 2 × Type 730 7-barrel 30 mm CIWS guns or Type 1130; 2 × 3 324mm Yu-7 ASW torpedo launchers; 2 × 6 Type 87 240mm anti-submarine rocket launcher (36 rockets carried); 2 × Type 726-4 18-tube decoy rocket launchers
- Aircraft carried: 1 Kamov Ka-28 'Helix' or Harbin Z-9C
- Aviation facilities: hangar

Xuzhou (530) is a Type 054A frigate of the People's Liberation Army Navy. She was commissioned on 27 January 2008.

== Development and design ==
The Type 054A carries HQ-16 medium-range air defence missiles and anti-submarine missiles in a vertical launching system (VLS) system. The HQ-16 has a range of up to 50 km, with superior range and engagement angles to the Type 054's HQ-7. The Type 054A's VLS uses a hot launch method; a shared common exhaust system is sited between the two rows of rectangular launching tubes.

The four AK-630 close-in weapon systems (CIWS) of the Type 054 were replaced with two Type 730 CIWS on the Type 054A. The autonomous Type 730 provides improved reaction time against close-in threats.

== Construction and career ==
Xuzhou was launched on 30 September 2006 at the Huangpu Wenchong Shipyard in Guangzhou. She was commissioned on 1 January 2008 in Zhoushan.

On 26 September 2014, Xuzhou, along with the East China Sea Fleet of the People's Liberation Army Navy, organized a real-fire drill in a complex underwater acoustic environment in a certain area of the South China Sea, and conducted continuous attacks on submarines by surface fleets and successive submarine ambushes, and research and practice for other subjects.

In February 2016, Xuzhou launched a major exercise mission in the East China Sea. On 20 March, an accident occurred when the oil pipeline ruptured on the way back. Fortunately, the crew handled it in time to avoid flashover. On 26 March, Xuzhou began to continue its mission.

Xuzhou was deployed as part of China's 29th Escort Task Force in the Gulf of Aden during 2018, where it deployed its helicopter along with Chinese Naval Special Forces to conduct VBSS operations.

Xuzhou was deployed as part of the 2023 Chinese military exercises around Taiwan, where it came within 5 km of ROCS Yi Yang.

== Emblem ==
The Emblem of the Xuzhou is shield-shaped. It has the PLA emblem along with 4 other stars in the center of the emblem.

Emblem of the Xuzhou
- https://web.archive.org/web/20250222074401/https://gfjy.ahnews.com.cn/gfsp/con/2023-04/24/3613_824304.html

== Gallery ==
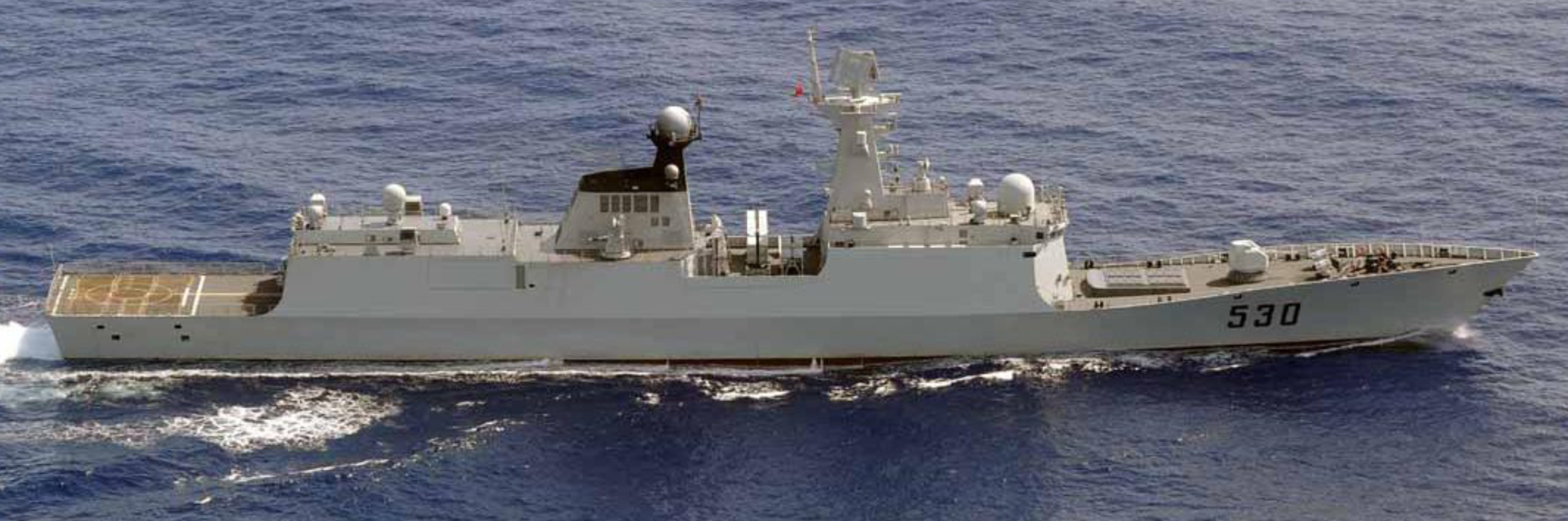
Xuzhou underway on 14 May 2012.

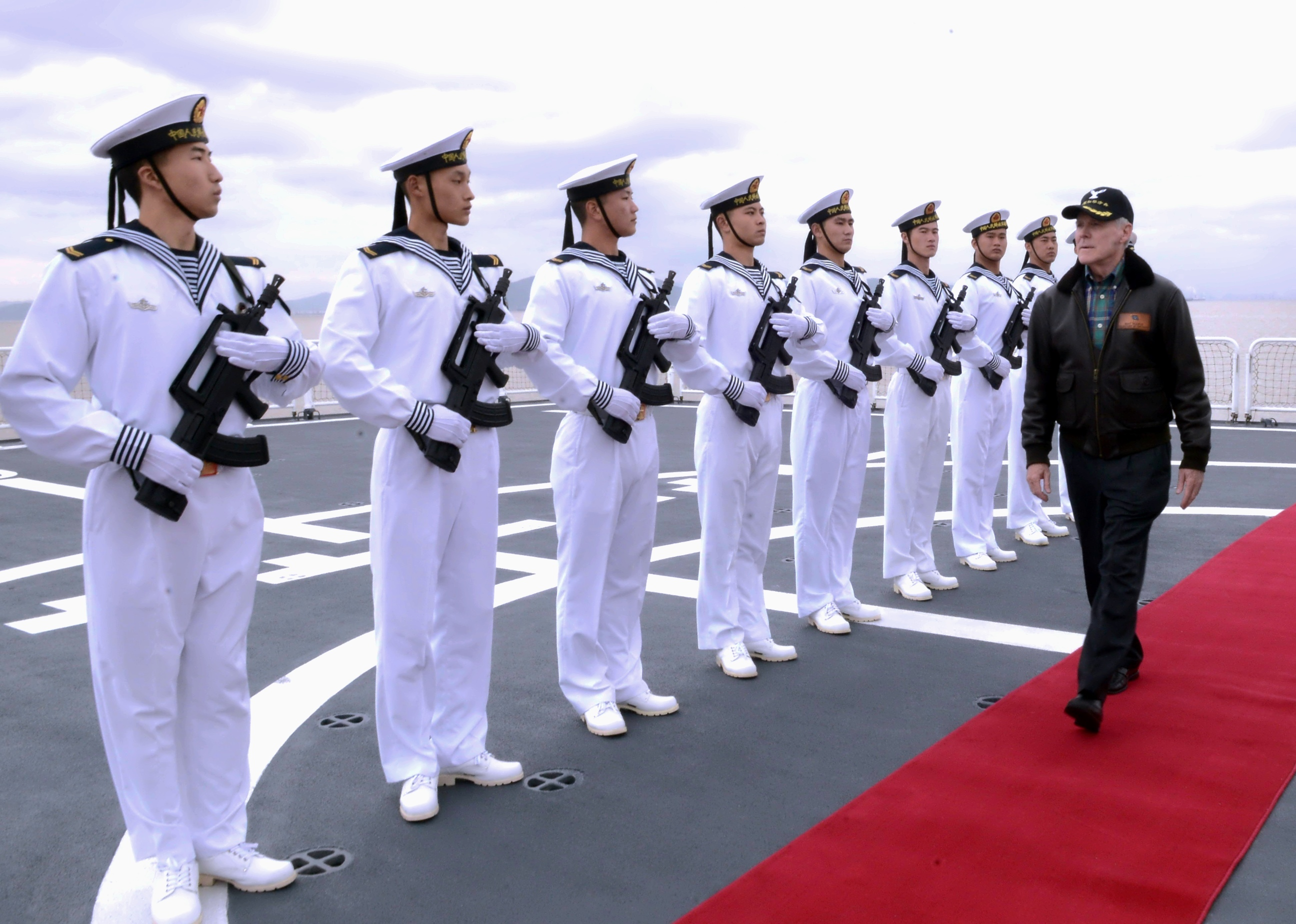
Ray Mabus visiting Xuzhou on 28 November 2012.

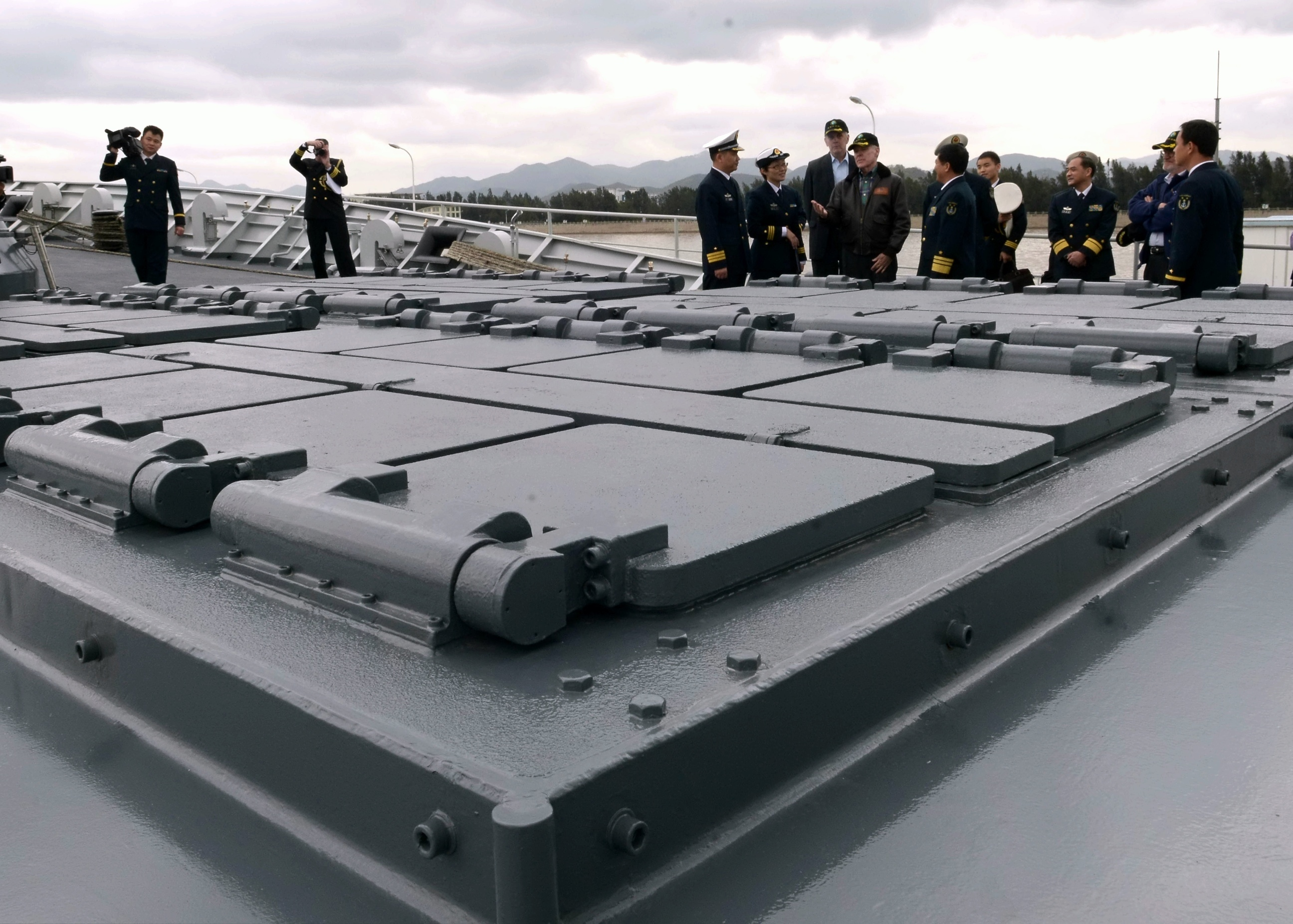
Xuzhou's VLS on 29 November 2012.

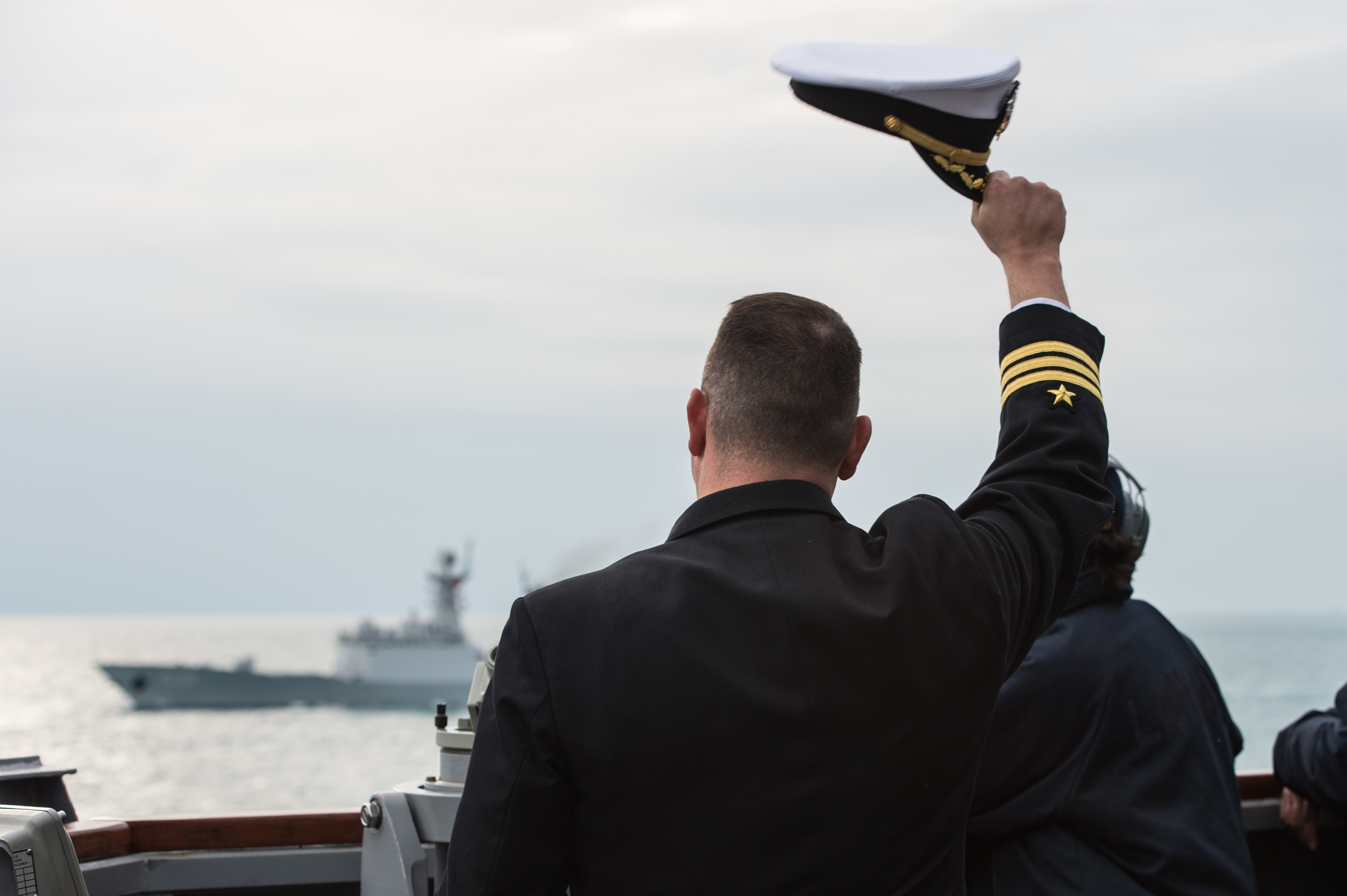
Xuzhou underway with USS Stethem on 19 November 2015.

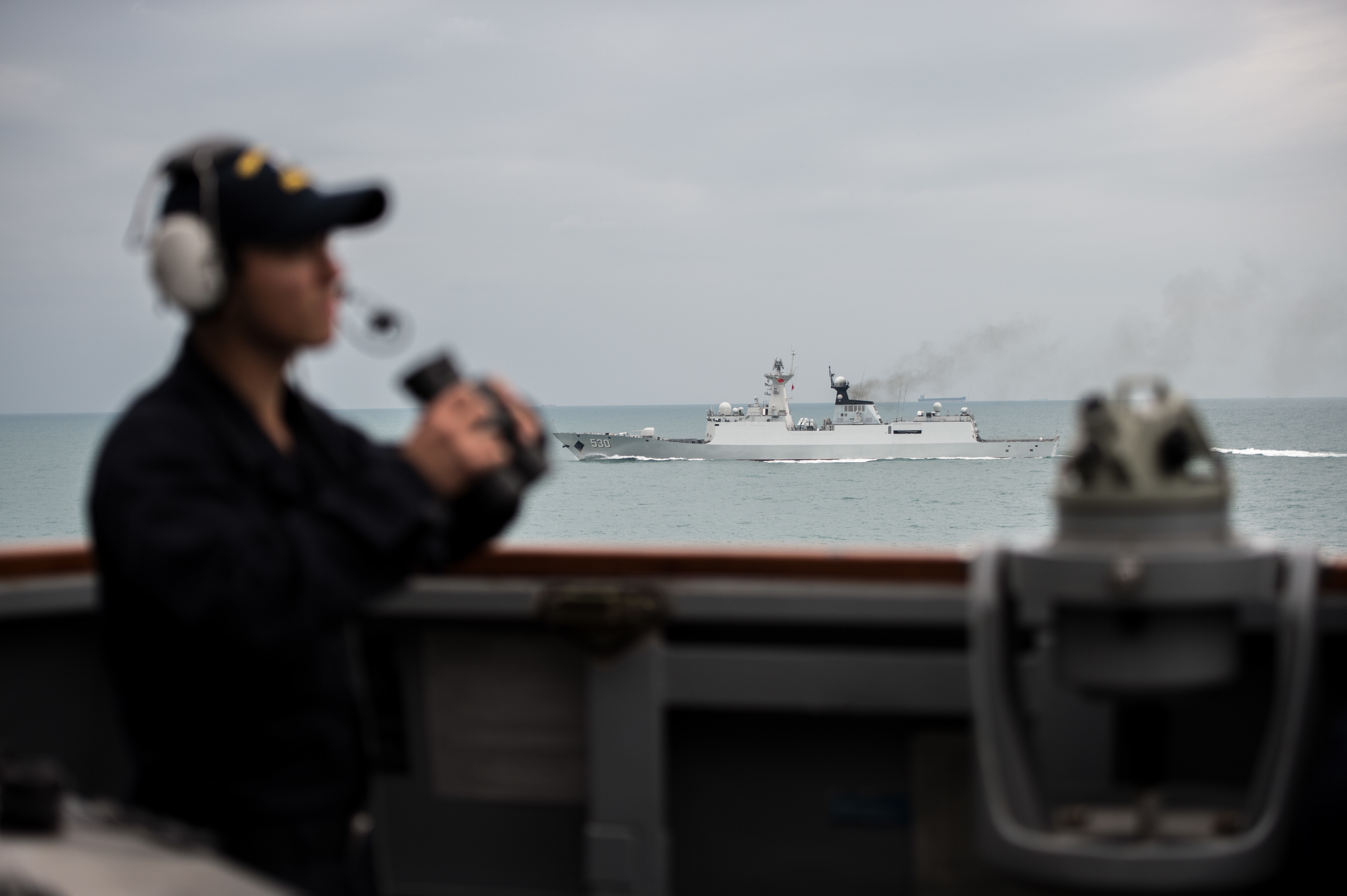
Xuzhou underway with USS Stethem on 19 November 2015.

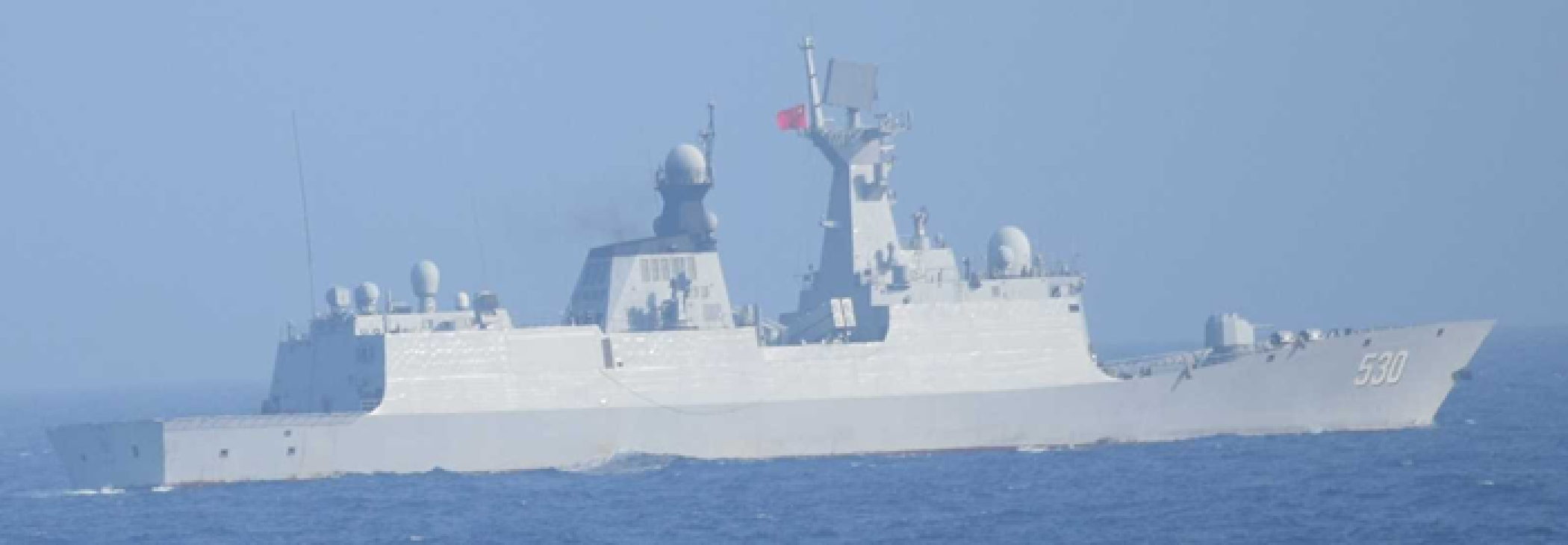
Xuzhou underway on 2 April 2019.

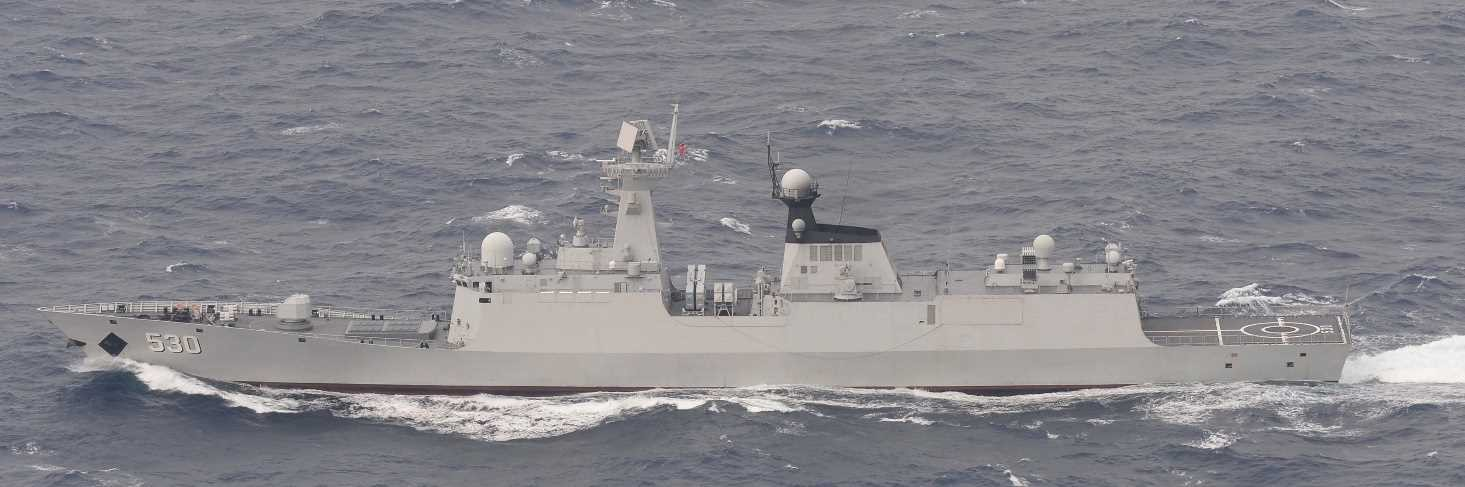
Xuzhou underway on 16 April 2019.
