= Joint Sea 2013 =

During 5–12 July 2013, warships from the Russian Pacific Fleet and the North Sea Fleet of the People's Liberation Army Navy participated in Joint Sea 2013 (Chinese name), bilateral naval maneuvers held in the Peter the Great Gulf. Naval Cooperation 2013 was the Russian name. Joint Sea 2013 was the largest naval drills yet undertaken by China's navy with a foreign navy. The exercise involved anti-submarine warfare drills, close maneuvers, and the simulated seizure of a hostile ship.

"Joint Sea" maneuvers continued after 2013.

== Naval forces ==
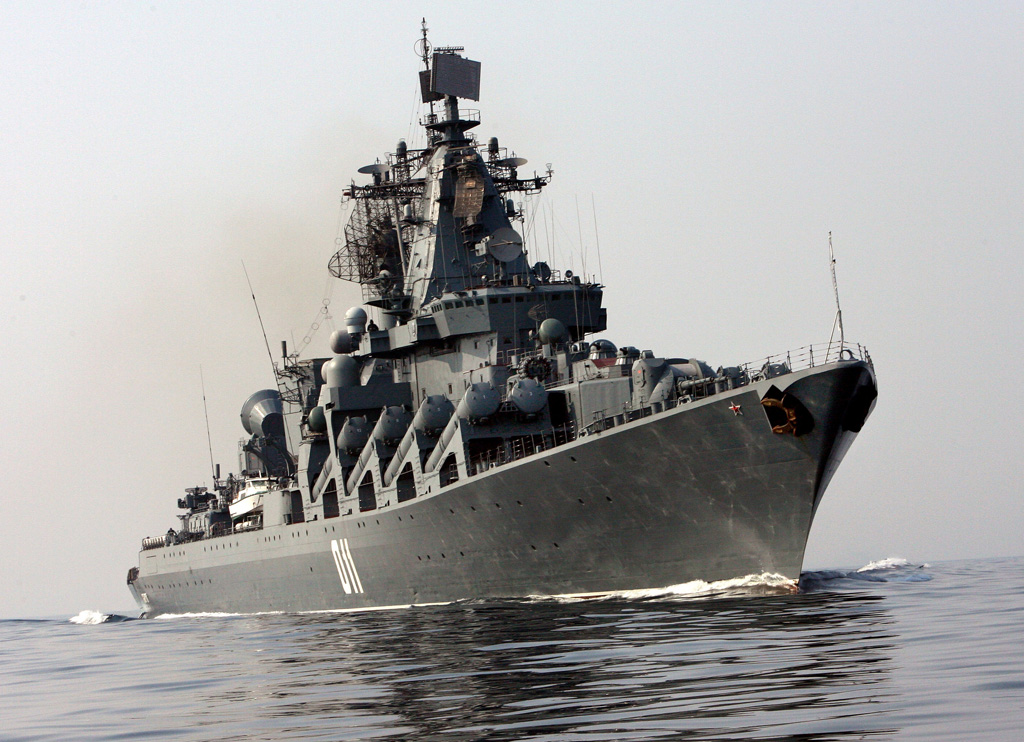
Varyag

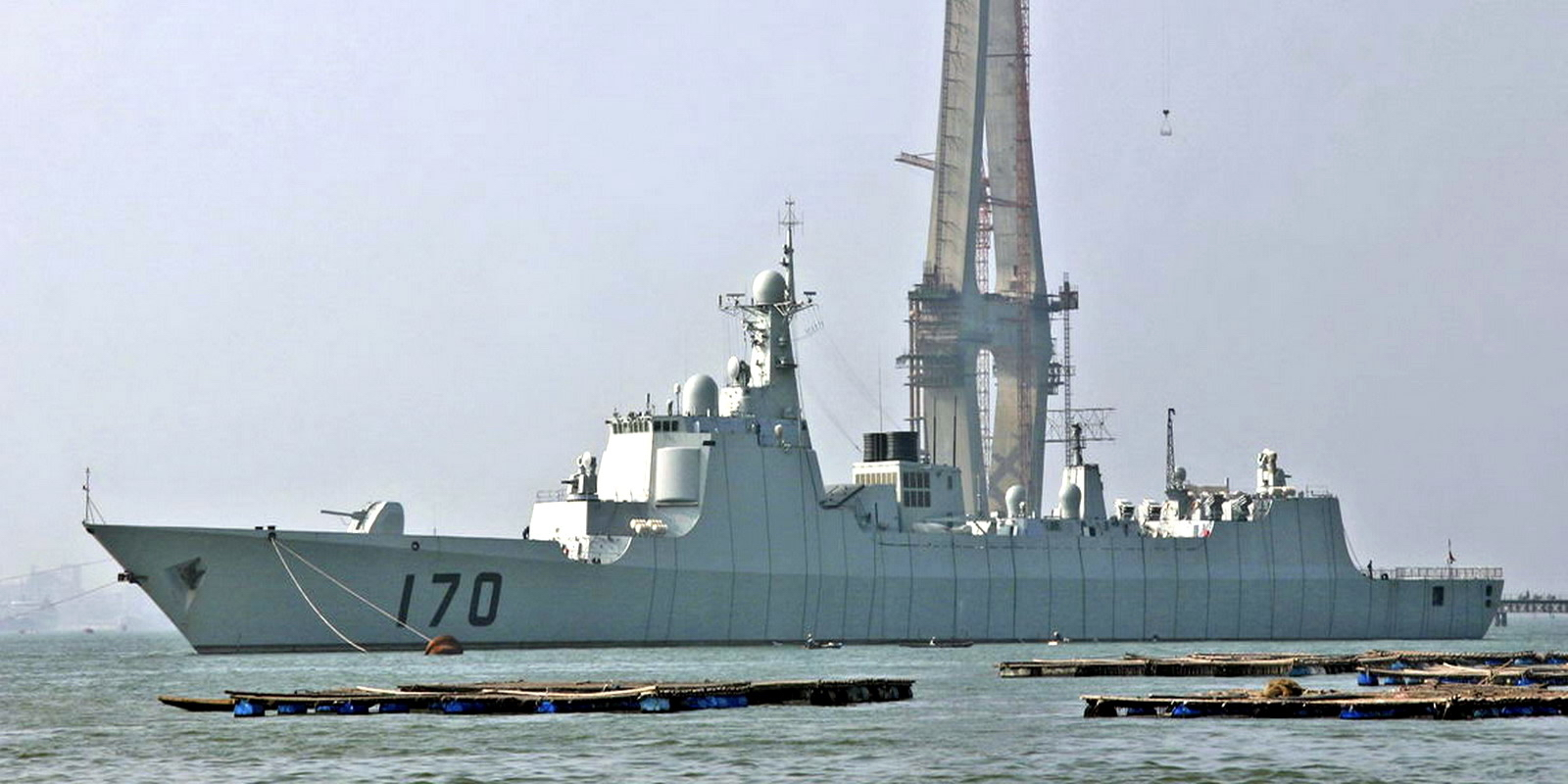
Lanzhou (170)

Russian Pacific Fleet:

- Project 1164 guided-missile cruiser (Slava):
  - Varyag (011) (pictured)
- Project 1155 guided-missile destroyer (Udaloy)
  - Admiral Vinogradov (572)
  - Marshal Shaposhnikov (543):
- Project 956 guided-missile cruiser (Sovremenny)
  - Bystry (715)
- Project 1241 guided-missile corvette (Tarantul):
  - Two units (940 & 927)
- Project 877 diesel-electric submarine (Kilo):
  - One unit

PLAN Northern Fleet:

- Type 051C guided-missile destroyer (Luzhou):
  - Shijiazhuang (116)
  - Shenyang (115)
- Type 052B guided-missile destroyer (Luyang I):
  - Wuhan (169)
- Type 052C guided-missile destroyer (Luyang II):
  - Lanzhou (170) (pictured)
- Type 054A guided-missile frigate (Jiangkai II):
  - Yantai (538)
  - Yancheng (546)
- Type 905 replenishment oiler (Fuqing):
  - Hongzehu (881)

Other forces included three planes, five ship-based helicopters, and two teams of special forces.
