= Chinese frigate Yantai =

Type 054A frigate of the PLA Navy

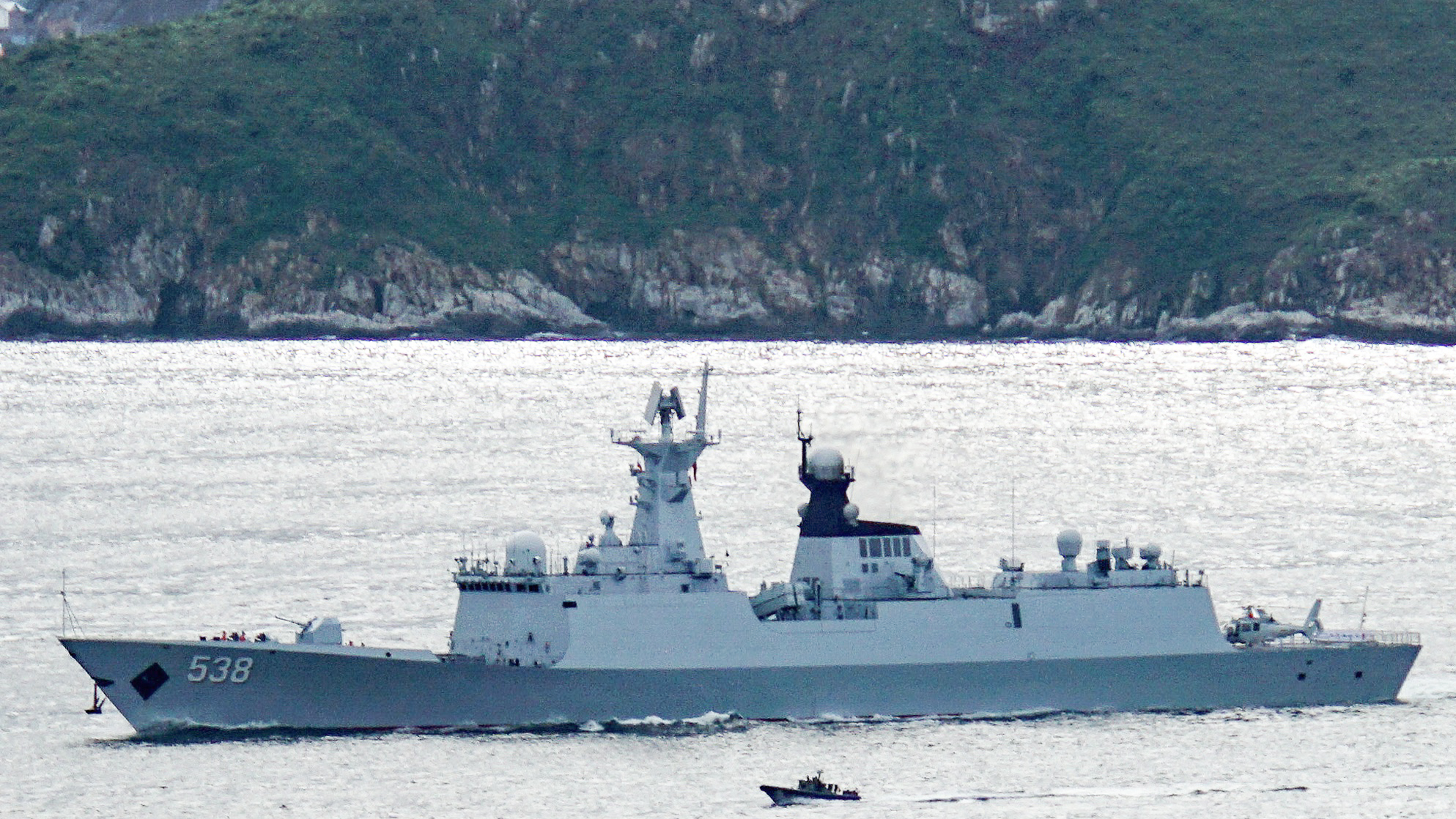
- Yantai entering Hong Kong on 28 November 2019

History

China
- Name: Yantai
- Namesake: Yantai; (烟台)
- Builder: Huangpu, Shanghai
- Launched: August 2010
- Commissioned: June 2011
- Identification: Pennant number: 538
- Motto: 和谐, 精武, 奉献 (peacefulness, elite, service)
- Status: Active
- Badge: See #Emblem and motto

General characteristics
- Class & type: Type 054A frigate
- Displacement: 4,053 tonnes (full)
- Length: 134.1 m (440 ft)
- Beam: 16 m (52 ft)
- Propulsion: CODAD, 4 × Shaanxi 16 PA6 STC diesels, 5700 kW (7600+ hp @ 1084 rpm) each
- Speed: 27 knots estimated
- Range: 8,025 nautical miles (9,235 mi; 14,862 km) estimated
- Complement: 165
- Sensors & processing systems: Type 382 Radar; Type 344 Radar (Mineral-ME Band Stand) OTH target acquisition and SSM fire control radar; 4 × Type 345 Radar (MR-90 Front Dome) SAM fire control radars; MR-36A surface search radar, I-band; Type 347G 76 mm gun fire control radar; 2 × Racal RM-1290 navigation radars, I-band; MGK-335 medium frequency active/passive sonar system; H/SJG-206 towed array sonar; ZKJ-4B/6 (developed from Thomson-CSF TAVITAC) combat data system; HN-900 Data link (Chinese equivalent of Link 11A/B, to be upgraded); SNTI-240 SATCOM; AKD5000S Ku band SATCOM
- Electronic warfare & decoys: Type 922-1 radar warning receiver; HZ-100 ECM & ELINT system; Kashtan-3 missile jamming system
- Armament: 1 × 32-cell VLS; HQ-16 SAM; Yu-8 anti submarine rocket launcher; 2 × 4 C-803 anti-ship / land attack cruise missiles; 1 × PJ26 76 mm dual-purpose gun; 2 × Type 730 7-barrel 30 mm CIWS guns or Type 1130; 2 × 3 324mm Yu-7 ASW torpedo launchers; 2 × 6 Type 87 240mm anti-submarine rocket launcher (36 rockets carried); 2 × Type 726-4 18-tube decoy rocket launchers
- Aircraft carried: 1 Kamov Ka-28 'Helix' or Harbin Z-9C
- Aviation facilities: hangar

Yantai (538) is a Type 054A frigate of the People's Liberation Army Navy. She was commissioned in June 2011. She is a member of the North Sea Fleet.

== Development and design ==
The Type 054A carries HQ-16 medium-range air defence missiles and anti-submarine missiles in a vertical launching system (VLS) system. The HQ-16 has a range of up to 50 km, with superior range and engagement angles to the Type 054's HQ-7. The Type 054A's VLS uses a hot launch method; a shared common exhaust system is sited between the two rows of rectangular launching tubes.

The four AK-630 close-in weapon systems (CIWS) of the Type 054 were replaced with two Type 730 CIWS on the Type 054A. The autonomous Type 730 provides improved reaction time against close-in threats.

== Construction and career ==
Yantai was launched in August 2010 at the China State Shipbuilding Corporation in Shanghai. She was commissioned in June 2011. She has been involved in anti-piracy operations in the gulf of Aden.

On May 17, 2015 Yantai along with Shenyang conducted a live fire exercise in the Yellow Sea.

== Emblem and motto ==
Emblem of the Yantai
- https://web.archive.org/web/20250222074621im_/https://gfjy.ahnews.com.cn/gfsp/pic/2023-04/24/824304_193e89ec-81a0-464e-a92a-87e0338d5e50.png

The Yantai's emblem features the outline of a Type 054A frigate in the middle along with the words "中国人民解放军海军烟台舰" (Chinese People's Liberation Army Navy ship Yantai) and "PLA Navy frigate Yantai" at the top. Her motto is "和谐，精武，奉献", which roughly translates to "Peaceful, elite, service".

== Gallery ==
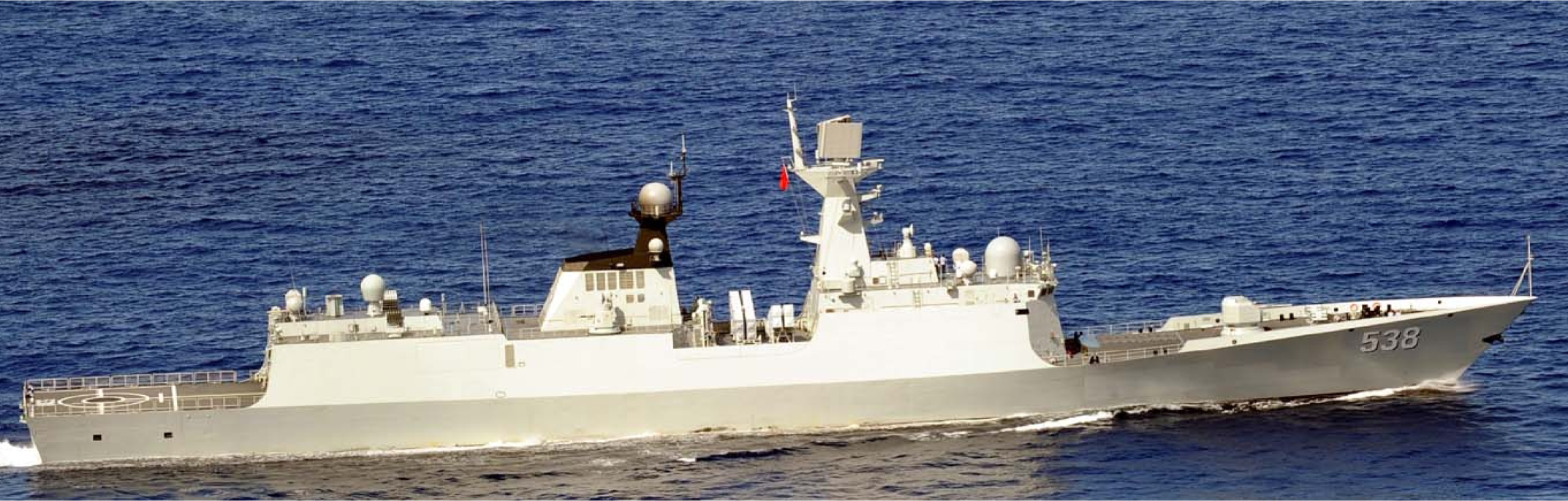
Yantai underway on 25 July 2013.

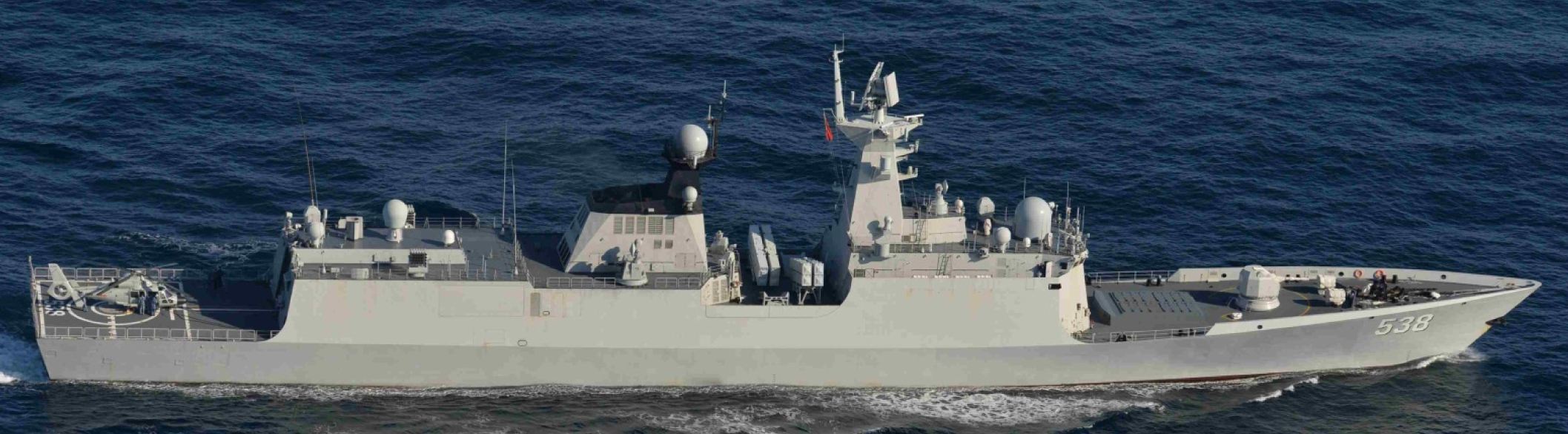
Yantai underway on 27 December 2014.

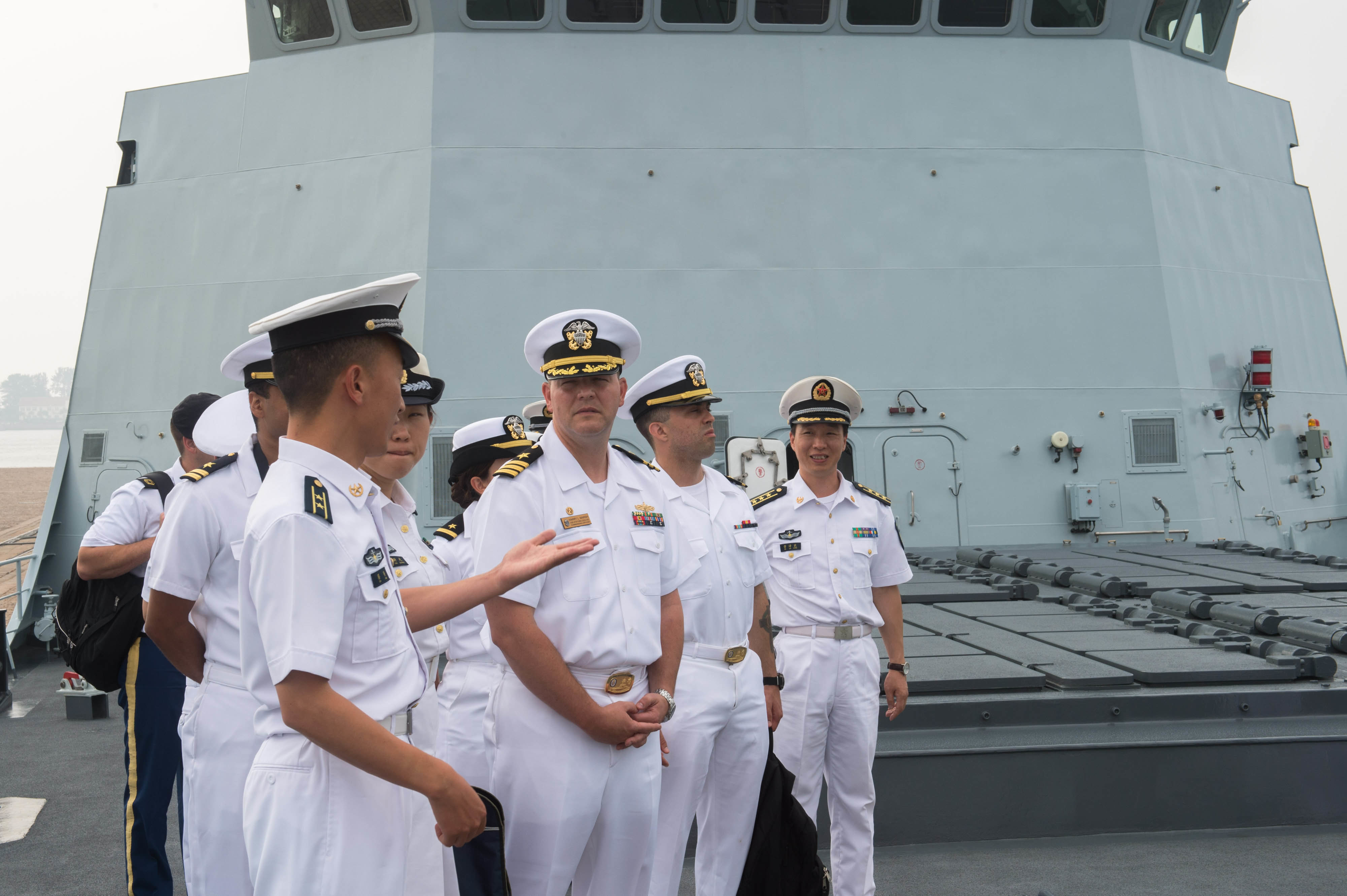
Commander Harry Marsh of USS Stethem aboard Yantai on 28 July 2015.

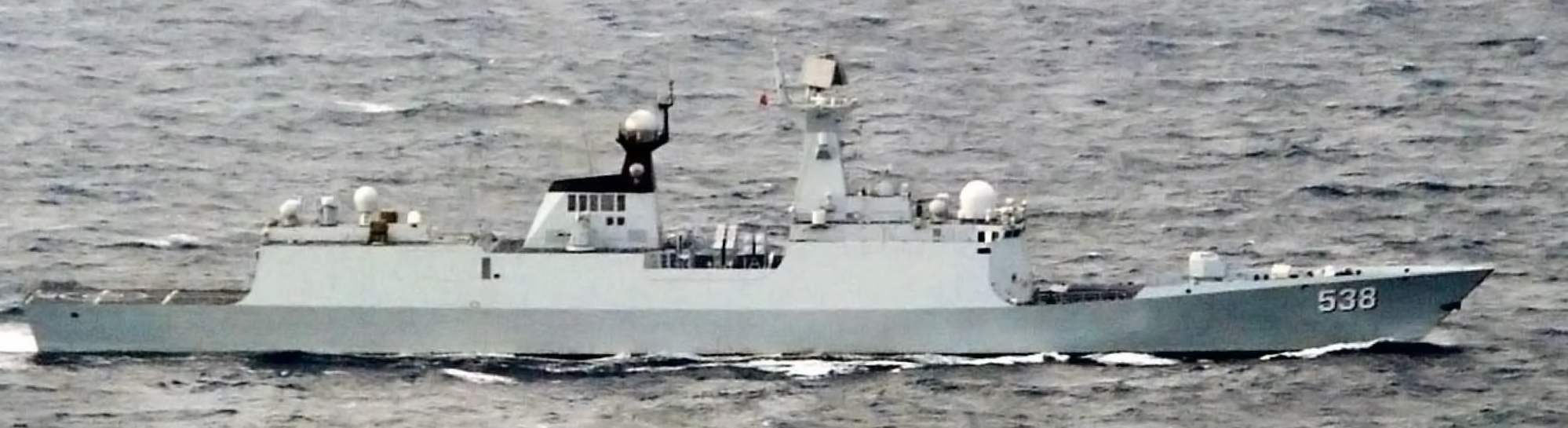
Yantai underway on 28 January 2016.

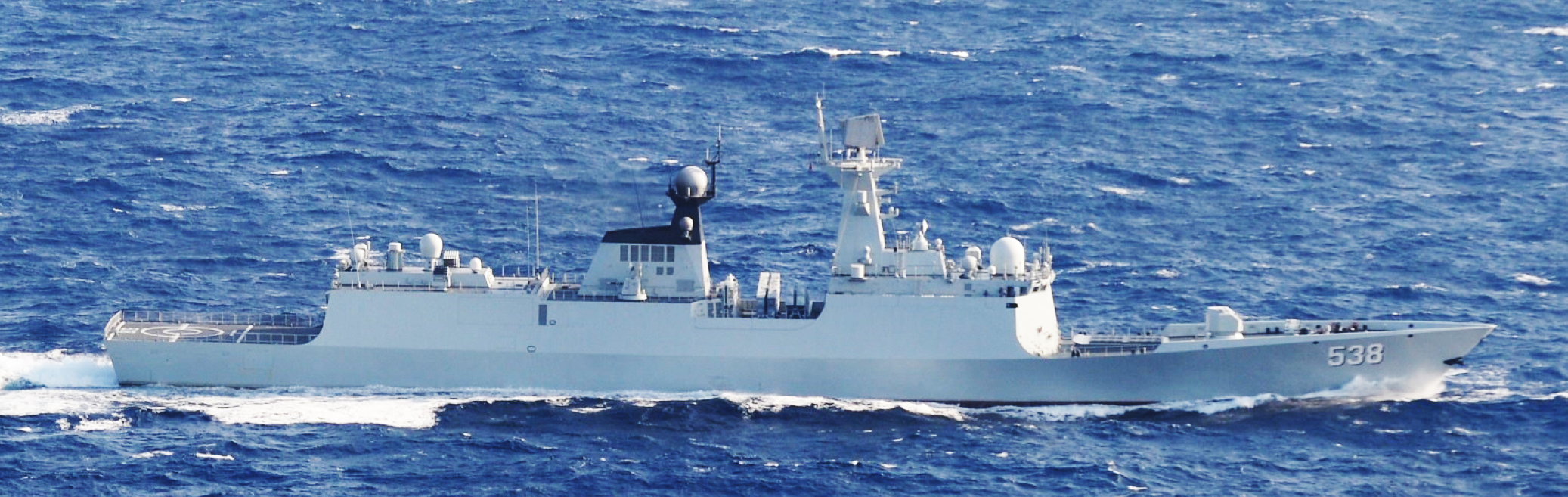
Yantai underway on 26 December 2016.

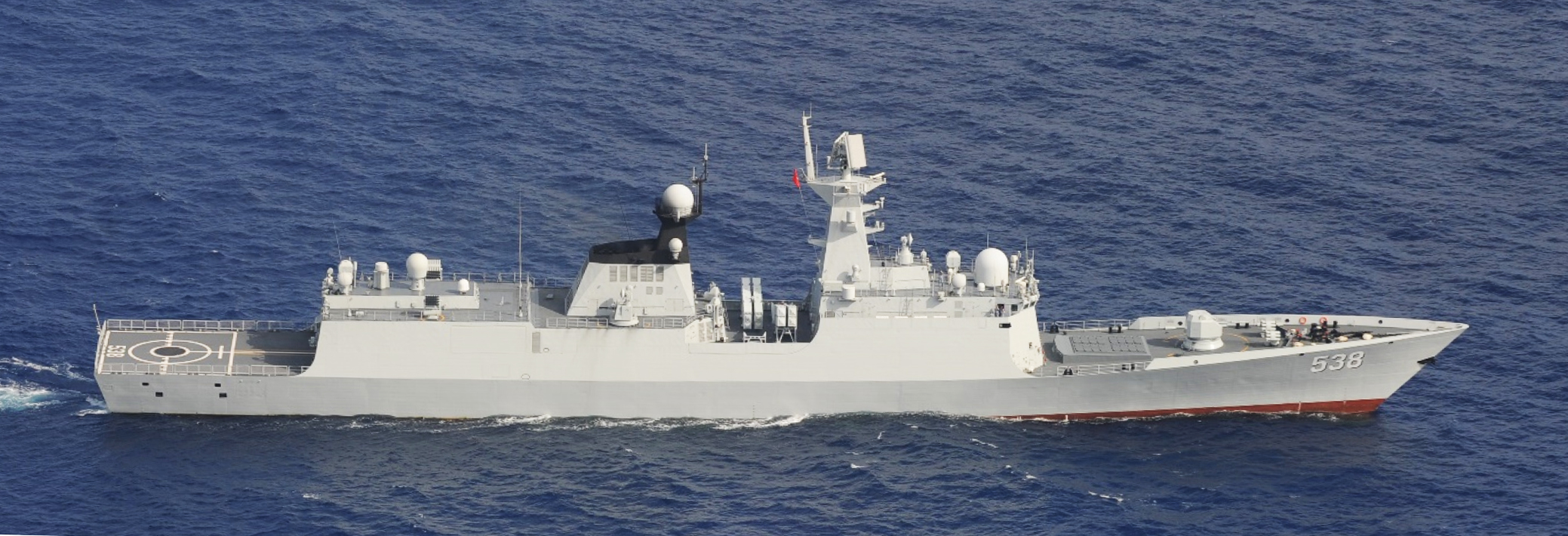
Yantai underway on 20 April 2018.
