= Chinese destroyer Shenyang =

Type 051C destroyer of the PLA Navy

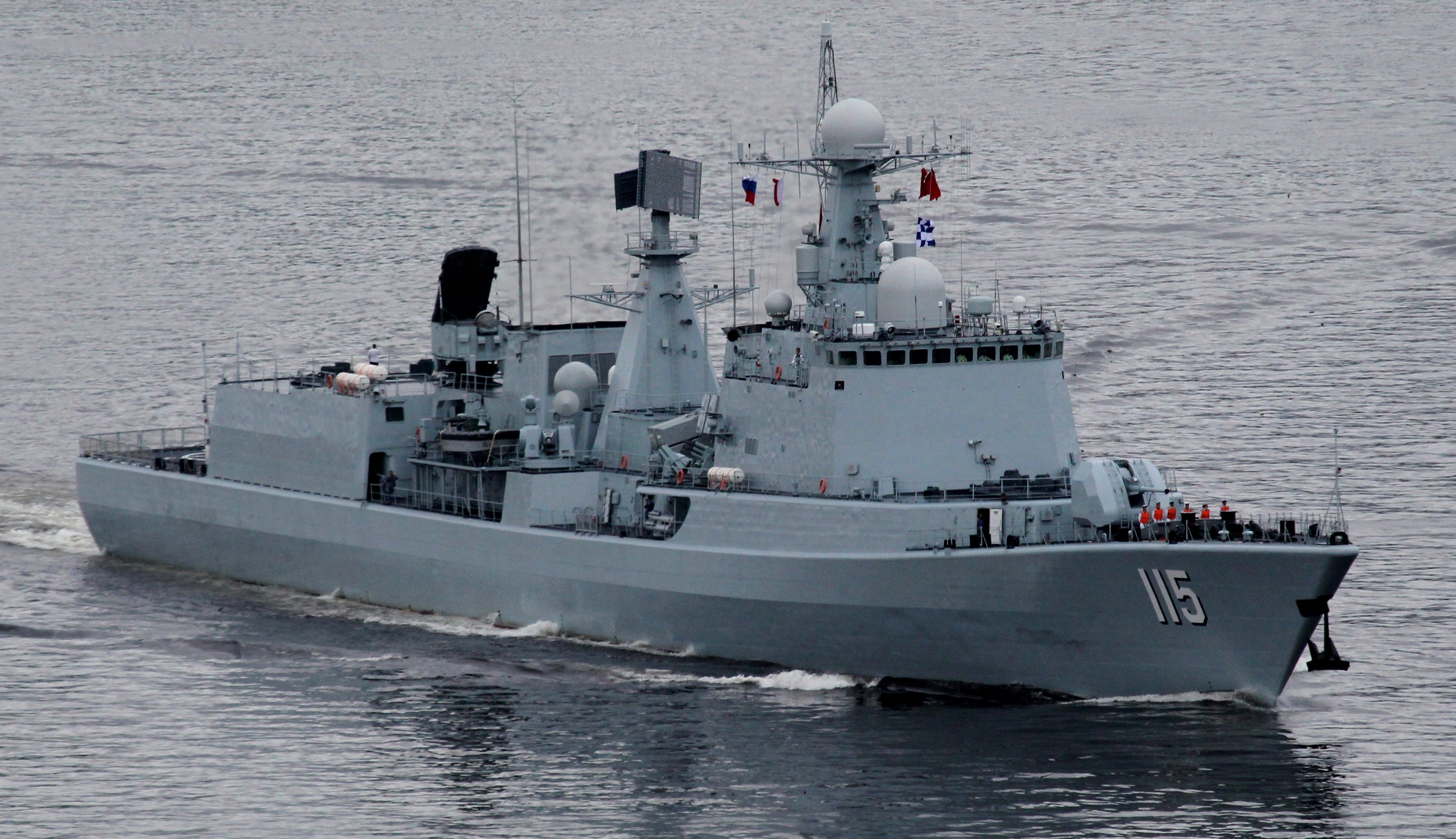
- Shenyang entering Vladivostok on 25 August 2015

History

China
- Name: Shenyang
- Namesake: Shenyang; (沈阳)
- Builder: Dalian Shipbuilding Industry Company, Dalian
- Launched: 28 December 2004
- Commissioned: 1 January 2006
- Home port: Qingdao
- Identification: Pennant number: 115
- Status: Active

General characteristics
- Class & type: Type 051C destroyer
- Displacement: 7,100 tons
- Length: 155 metres (508.5 feet)
- Beam: 17.2 metres (56 feet)
- Draught: 6 metres (19.7 feet)
- Propulsion: 2 indigenous steam turbines
- Speed: 30 knots
- Sensors & processing systems: Fregat-MAE-5 (Top Plate) 3D air search phased array radar; Type 364 (SR64) surface search radar; Mineral-ME (Band Stand) over-the-horizon targeting radar; Tombstone 3D phased-array target tracking radar; Type 347G I-band fire-control radars
- Armament: 48 × S-300FM (SA-N-20) surface-to-air missiles (6 x 8 revolver-style VLS); 8 × YJ-83 (C-803) anti-ship missiles; 1 × 100 mm dual purpose gun; 2 × Type 730 30 mm seven-barrel Gatling gun close-in weapons systems; 2 × 3 324mm torpedo launchers carrying Yu-7 torpedoes; 2 × 15 Type 946 decoy launchers; 2 × 18 Type 726-4 decoy launchers
- Aircraft carried: Kamov Ka-28 Helix-size helicopter
- Aviation facilities: Helipad

Shenyang (115) is the lead ship of Type 051C destroyer of the People's Liberation Army Navy. She was commissioned on 1 January 2006.

== Development and design ==
The Type 051C destroyers were constructed at Dalian Shipyard and was revealed in 2004. They use the advanced Russian S-300FM air defence missile system with track-via-missile homing guided by a single Tombstone radar. The missile has a maximum range of 150 km and an operating altitude of 10 m - 27 km.

The anti-ship abilities possessed by the Luzhou class includes 8 indigenous YJ-83 (C-803) Anti-ship missiles. This anti-ship missile has a range of 150+ km and approaches its target in sea skimming mode at a speed of Mach 1.5. As a secondary role, the missile can also be used against land targets.

The ship uses two Type 730 CIWS guns for air defence. The Type 730 is a highly effective CIWS that is also installed on the Type 052B (Guangzhou class) and Type 052C/052D destroyers, and the Type 054A (Jiangkai II class) frigates. The ship also has 100 mm gun based on a French design for use against surface targets.

== Construction and career ==
Shenyang was launched on 28 December 2004 at the Dalian Shipyard in Dalian. The system installation was completed in late 2005 and commissioned on 1 January 2006.

On April 23, 2009, to celebrate the 60th anniversary of the founding of the Chinese People's Liberation Army Navy, Shenyang served in the naval parade.

On July 5, 2013, 4 destroyers, 2 frigates, and 1 supply ship including the Shenyang (formation command ship) and Shijiazhuang arrived in Vladivostok, Russia for the Naval Cooperation 2013 Russian maritime joint military exercises.

== Gallery ==
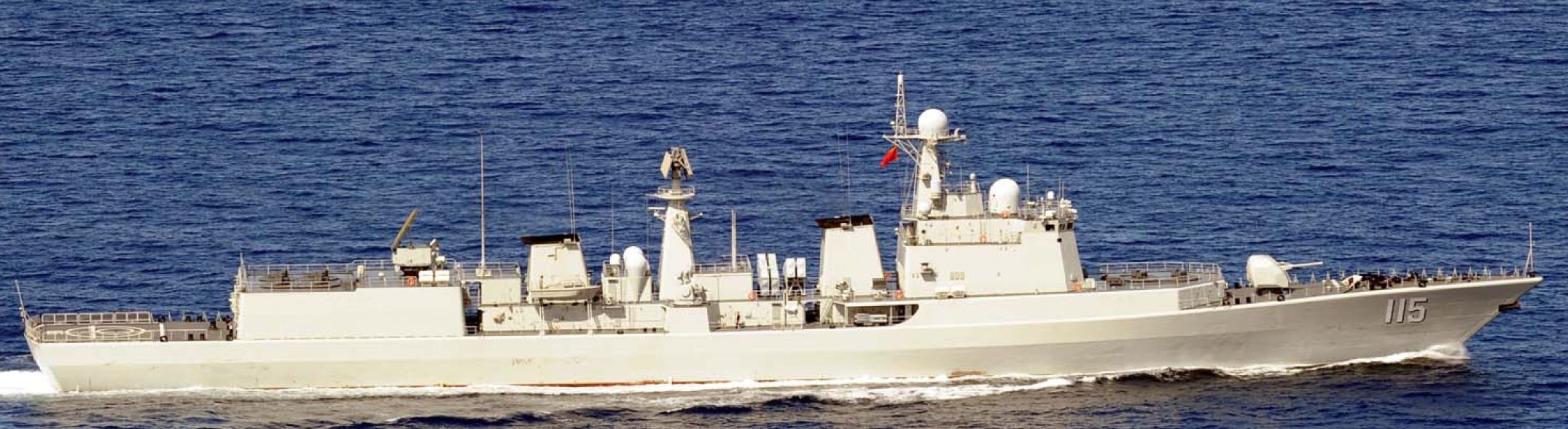
Shenyang underway on 25 July 2013.

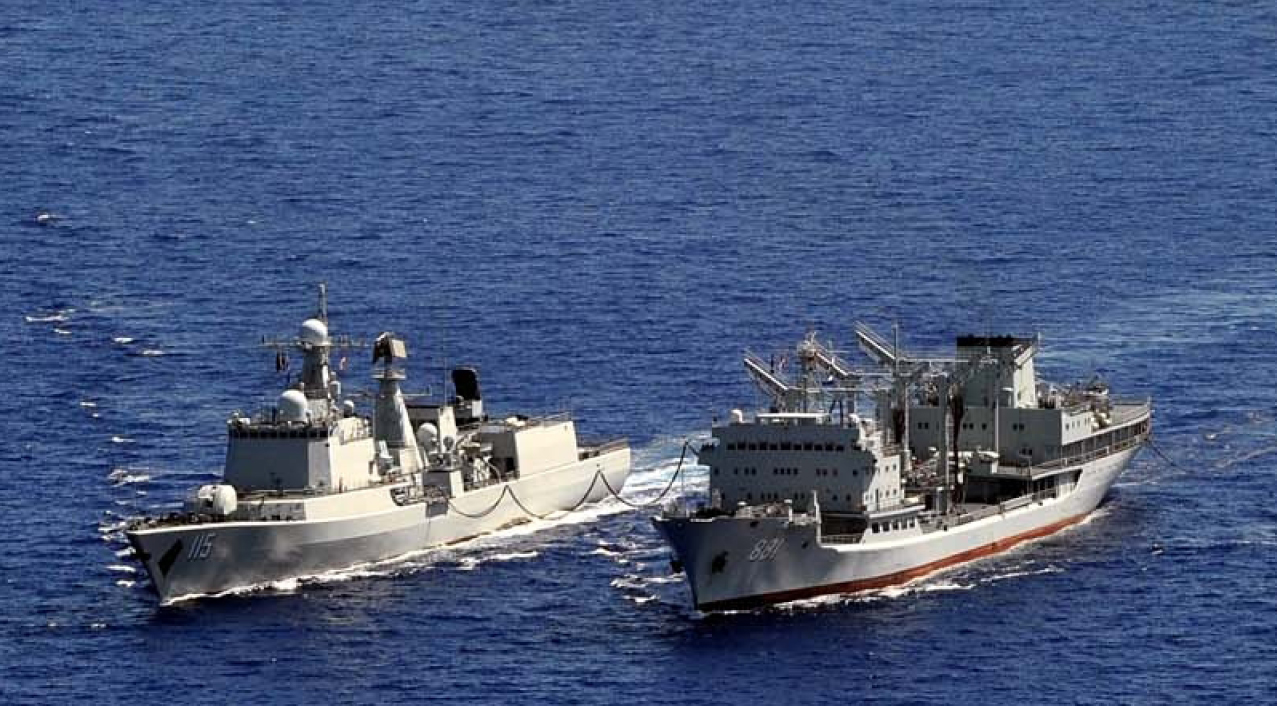
Shenyang refueling with Hongzehu on 25 July 2013.

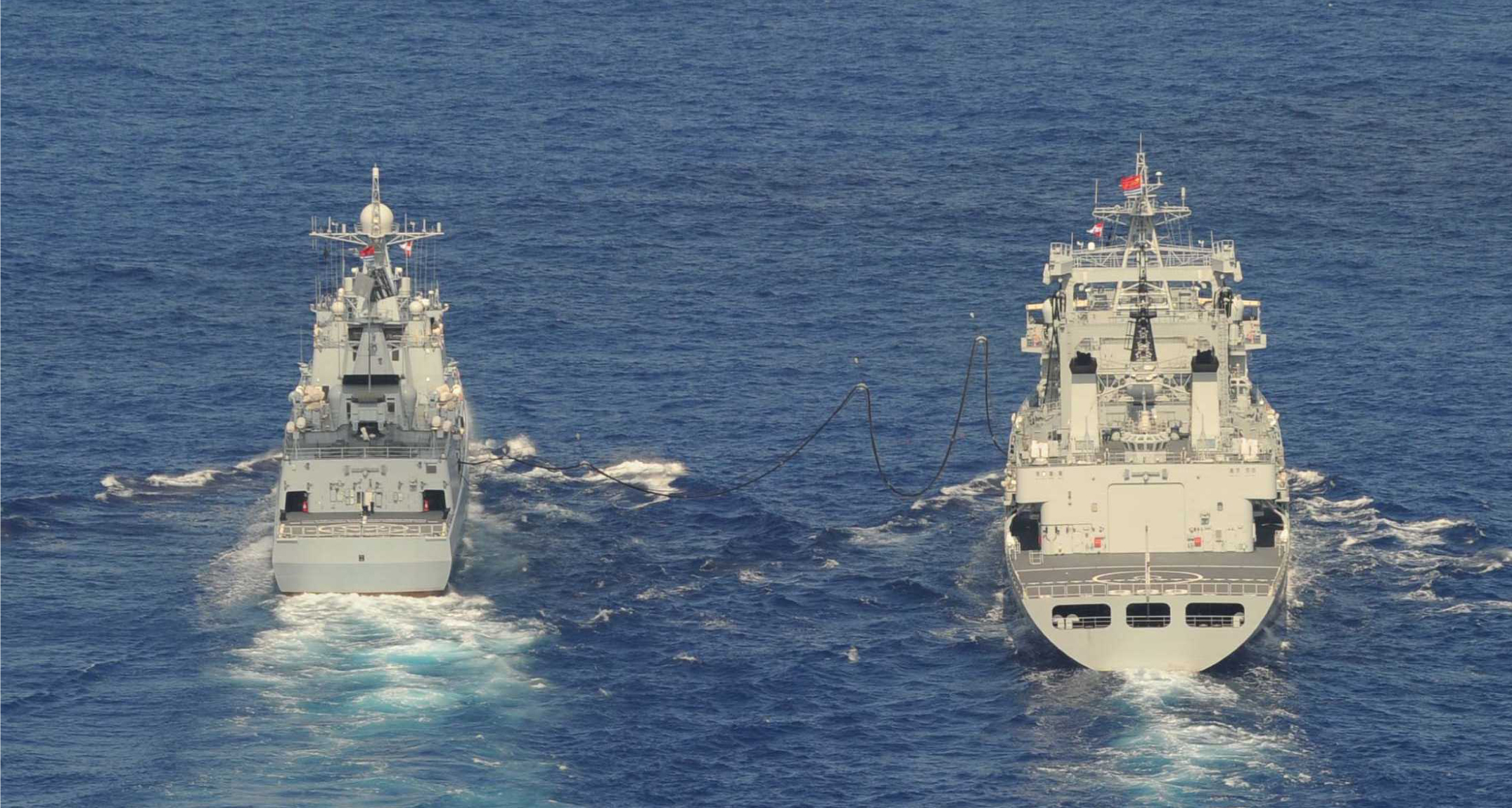
Shenyang refueling with Hongzehu on 25 July 2013.

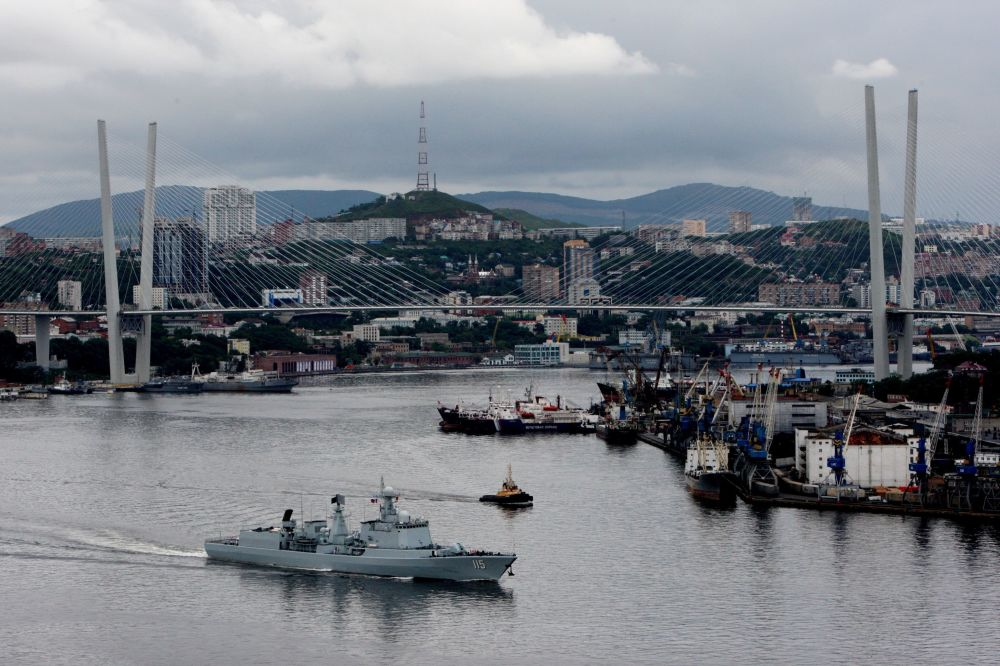
Shenyang arriving in Vladivostok on 23 August 2015.

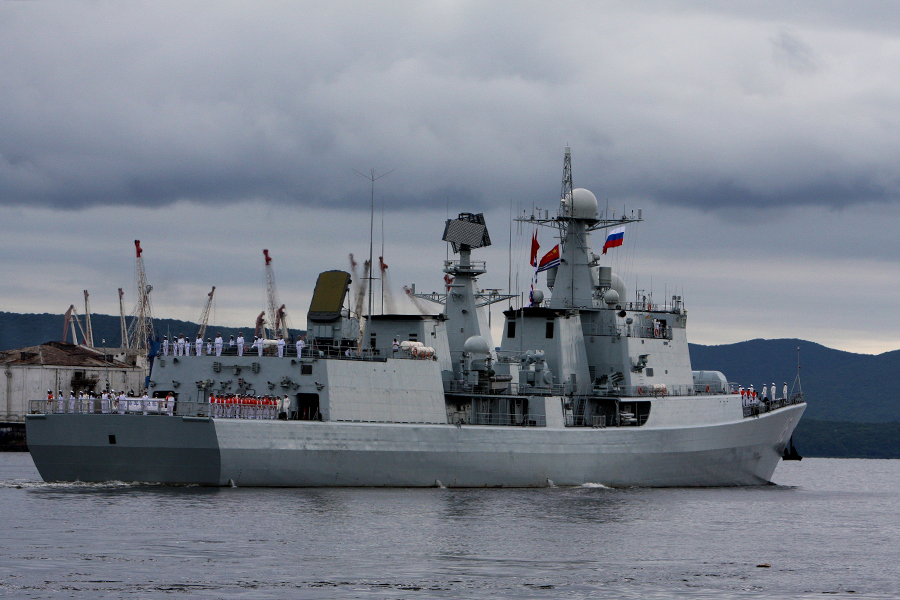
Shenyang arriving in Vladivostok on 23 August 2015.

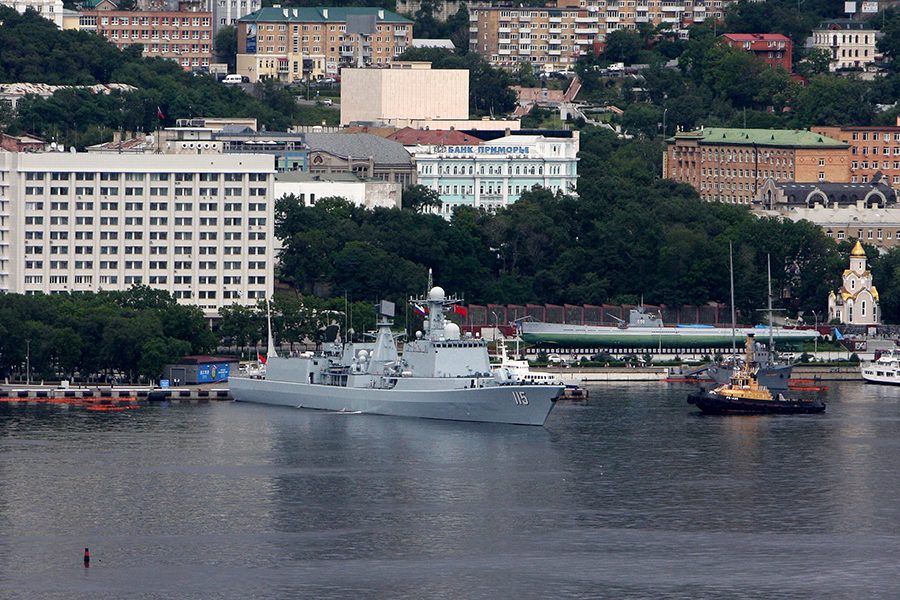
Shenyang moored in Vladivostok on 23 August 2015.

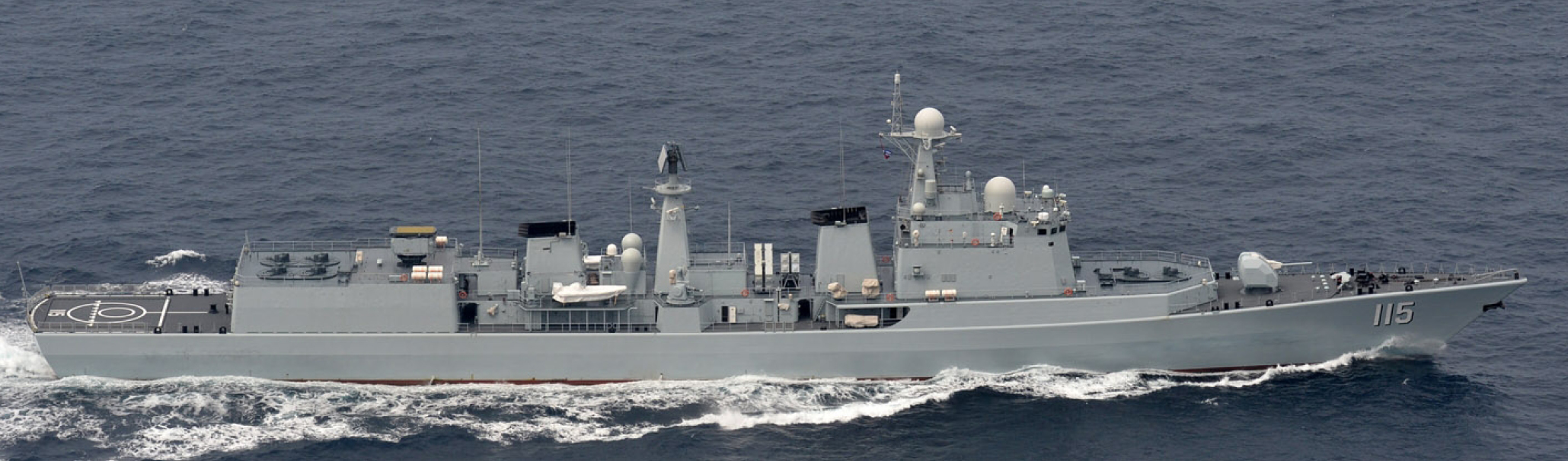
Shenyang underway on 29 August 2015.

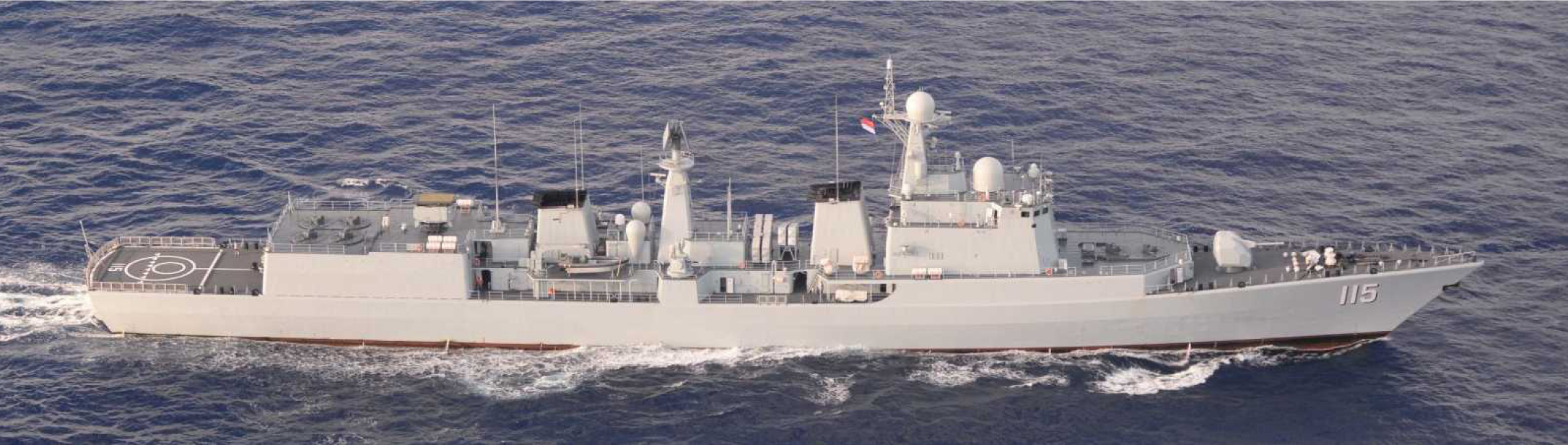
Shenyang underway on 11 September 2015.
