= Type 51 =

Type 51 may refer to:

- Bugatti Type 51, motor vehicle produced by the auto-maker Bugatti
- Cadillac Type 51, motor vehicle produced by the auto-maker Cadillac
- Type 51 pistol, a variant of the Chinese Type 54 pistol
- Type 51, Chinese reverse-engineered copy of US M20 Super Bazooka
- Type 051 destroyer, Chinese navy destroyer class
- Type 051B destroyer, Chinese navy destroyer class
