= Chinese destroyer Shijiazhuang =

Type 051C destroyer of the PLA Navy

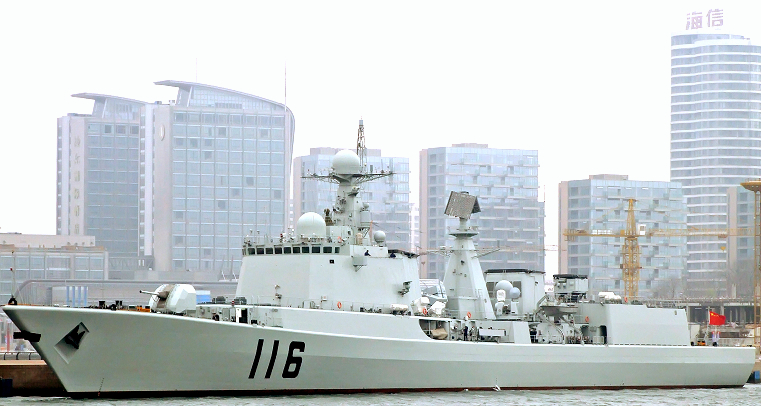
- Shijiazhuang on 10 January 2010

History

China
- Name: Shijiazhuang
- Namesake: Shijiazhuang; (石家庄)
- Builder: Dalian Shipbuilding Industry Company, Dalian
- Launched: 26 January 2005
- Commissioned: 22 January 2007
- Home port: Qingdao
- Identification: Pennant number: 116
- Status: Active

General characteristics
- Class & type: Type 051C destroyer
- Displacement: 7,100 tons
- Length: 155 metres (508.5 feet)
- Beam: 17.2 metres (56 feet)
- Draught: 6 metres (19.7 feet)
- Propulsion: 2 indigenous steam turbines
- Speed: 30 knots
- Sensors & processing systems: Fregat-MAE-5 (Top Plate) 3D air search phased array radar; Type 364 (SR64) surface search radar; Mineral-ME (Band Stand) over-the-horizon targeting radar; Tombstone 3D phased-array target tracking radar; Type 347G I-band fire-control radars
- Armament: 48 × S-300FM (SA-N-20) surface-to-air missiles (6 × 8 revolver-style VLS); 8 × YJ-83 (C-803) anti-ship missiles; 1 × 100 mm dual-purpose gun; 2 × Type 730 30 mm seven-barrel Gatling gun close-in weapons systems; 2 × 3 324 m torpedo launchers carrying Yu-7 torpedoes; 2 × 15 Type 946 decoy launchers; 2 × 18 Type 726-4 decoy launchers
- Aircraft carried: Kamov Ka-28 Helix-size helicopter
- Aviation facilities: Helipad

Shijiazhuang (116) is the second ship of Type 051C destroyer of the People's Liberation Army Navy. She was commissioned on 22 January 2007.

== Development and design ==
The Type 051C destroyers were constructed at Dalian Shipyard and was revealed in 2004. They uses the advanced Russian S-300FM air defence missile system with track-via-missile homing guided by a single Tombstone radar. The missile has a maximum range of 150 km and an operating altitude of 10 m - 27 km.

The anti-ship abilities possessed by the Luzhou class includes 8 indigenous YJ-83 (C-803) Anti-ship missiles. This anti-ship missile has a range of 150+ km and approaches its target in sea skimming mode at a speed of Mach 1.5. As a secondary role, the missile can also be used against land targets.

The ship uses two Type 730 CIWS guns for air defence. The Type 730 is a highly effective CIWS that is also installed on the Type 052B (Guangzhou class) and Type 052C/052D destroyers, and the Type 054A (Jiangkai II class) frigates. The ship also has 100 mm gun based on a French design for use against surface targets.

== Construction and career ==
Shijiazhuang was launched on 26 January 2005 at the Dalian Shipyard in Dalian. The system installation was completed in late 2005 and commissioned on 1 January 2006.

On April 23, 2009, to celebrate the 60th anniversary of the founding of the Chinese People's Liberation Army Navy, Shijiazhuang served as the main review ship.

On April 12, 2018, at the maritime parade in the South China Sea, her No.116 appeared in the Carrier Strike Echelon.

== Gallery ==
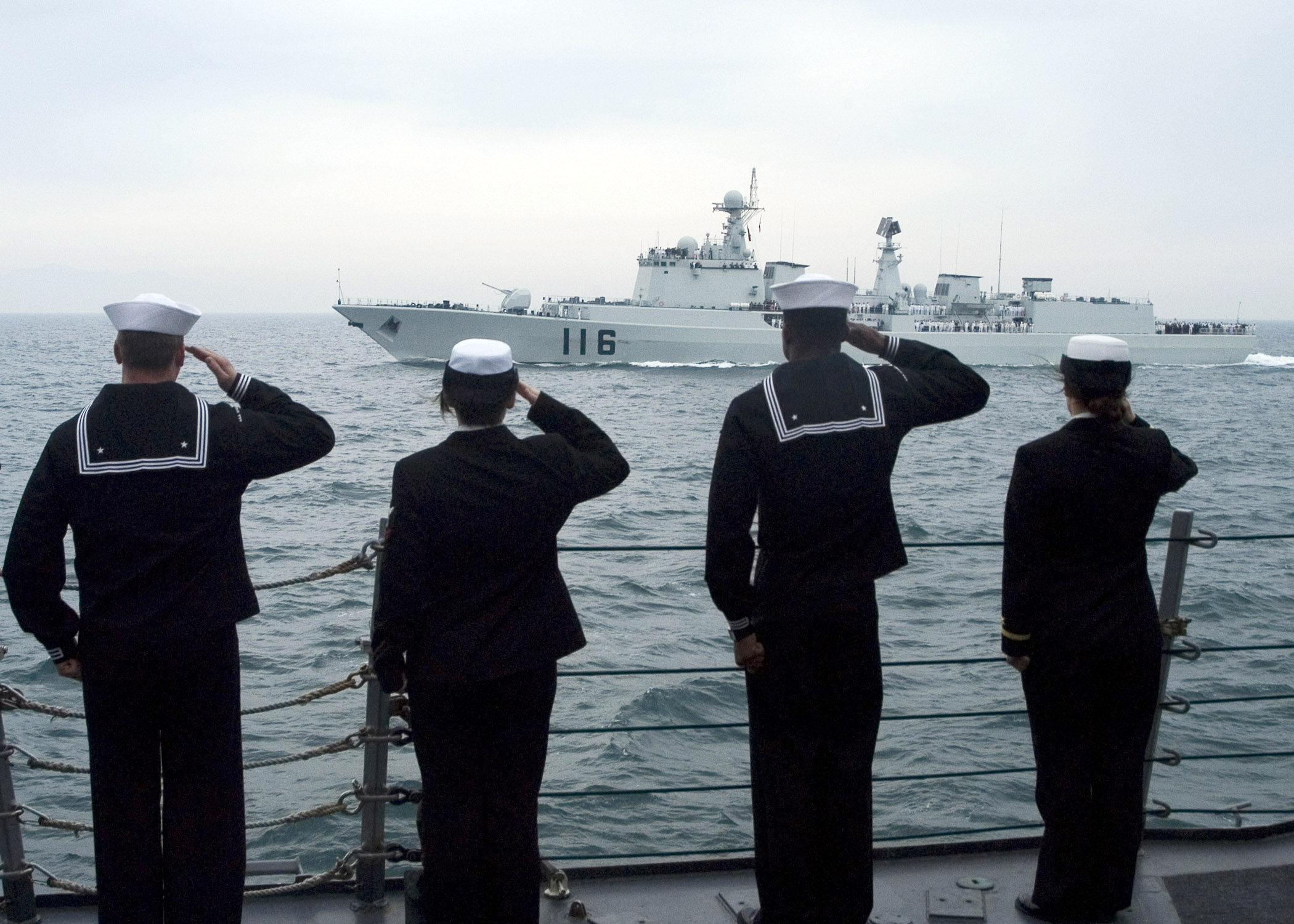
Shijiazhuang coming alongside USS Fitzgerald on 23 April 2009.

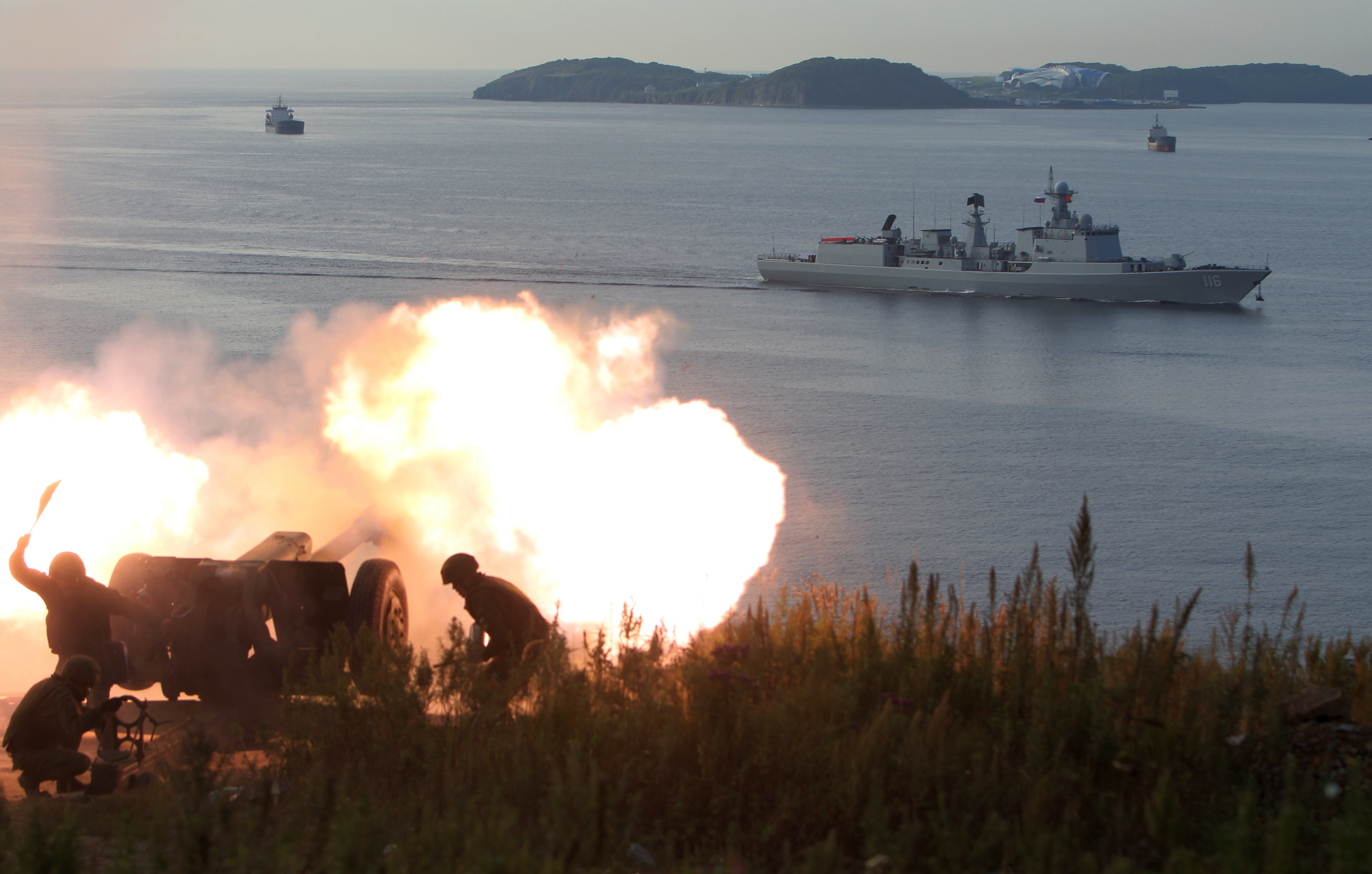
Shijiazhuang entering Vladivostok on 18 September 2017.

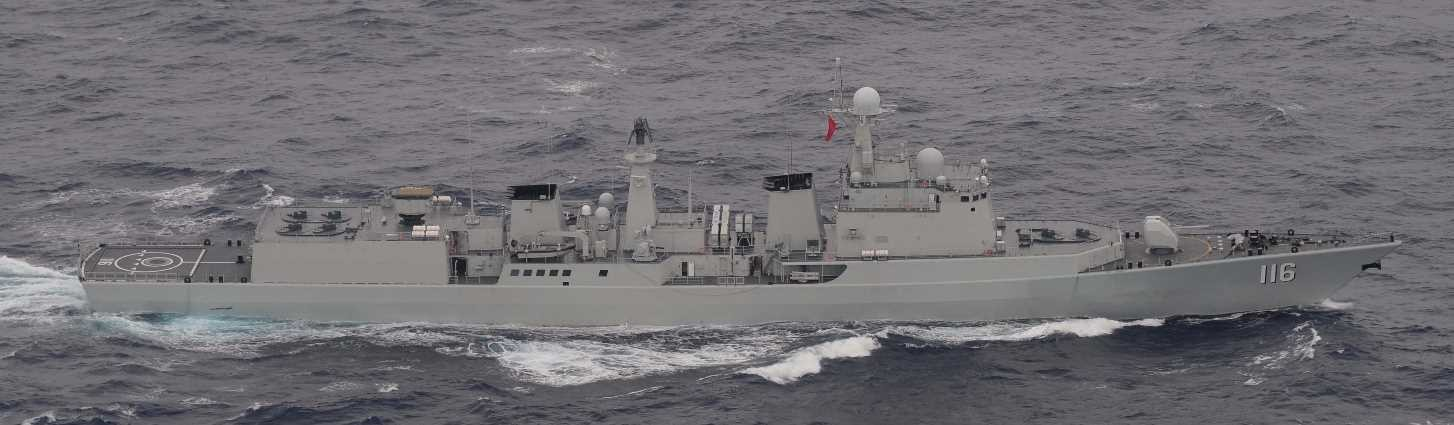
Shijiazhuang underway on 11 June 2019.
