= Chinese destroyer Shenzhen =

Type 051B destroyer of the PLA Navy

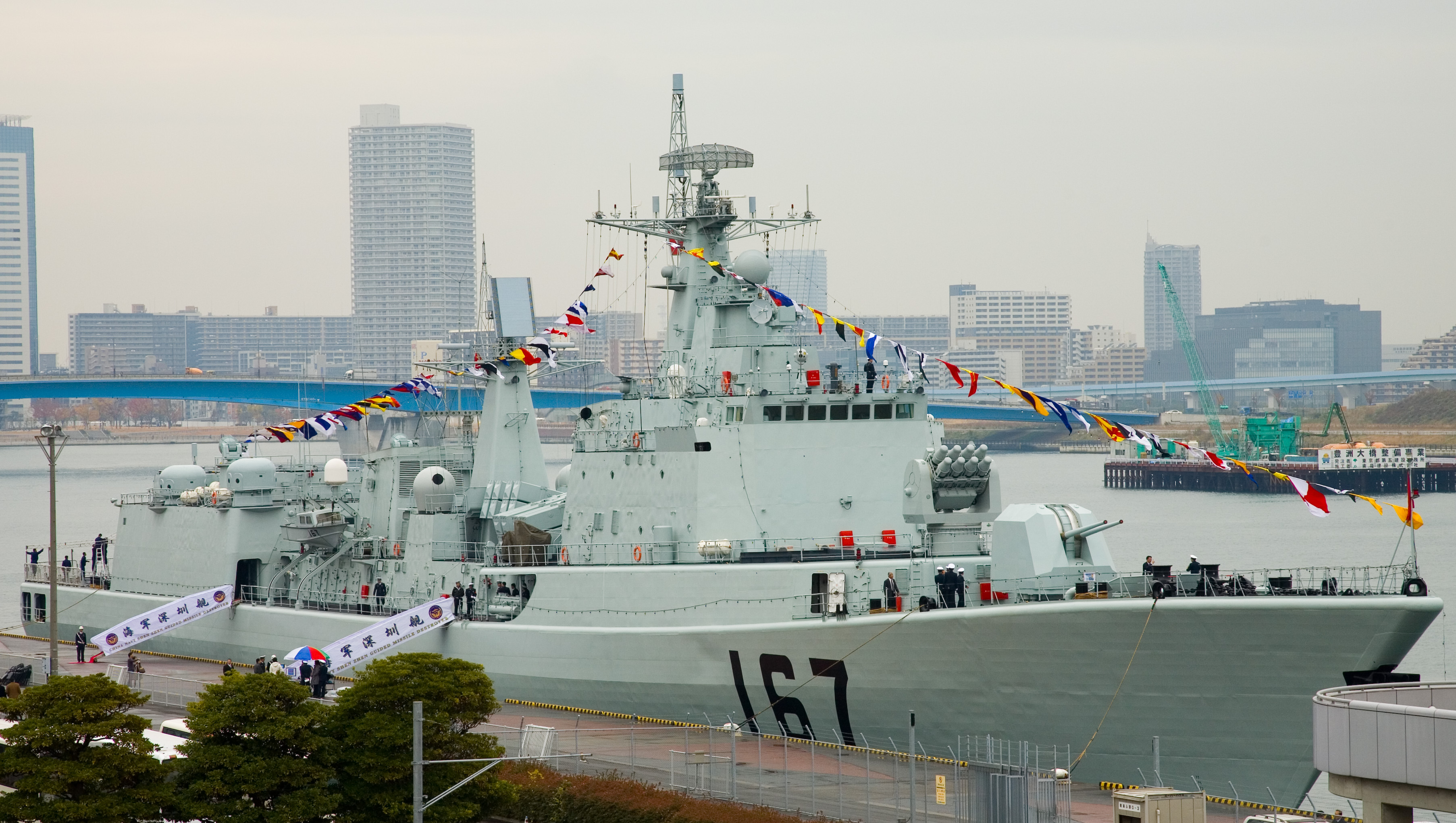
- Shenzhen (appearance before the modernization) moored at Tokyo in November 2007

Class overview
- Builders: Dalian Shipbuilding Industry Company
- Operators: People's Liberation Army Navy
- Preceded by: Type 051 (based on hull family); Type 052 (based on commissioning date)
- Succeeded by: Type 051C (based on hull family); Type 956E / 956EM (based on commissioning date)
- In commission: 1999-present
- Completed: 1
- Active: 1

History

China
- Name: Shenzhen
- Namesake: Shenzhen
- Laid down: July 1996
- Launched: 16 October 1997
- Commissioned: December 1998
- Home port: Zhanjiang
- Identification: Pennant number: 167
- Status: Active

General characteristics
- Class & type: Type 051B destroyer
- Displacement: 6,096 tonnes (6,000 long tons)
- Length: 154 m (505 ft 3 in)
- Beam: 16 m (52 ft 6 in)
- Draught: 6 m (19 ft 8 in)
- Propulsion: Combined diesel or gas; 2 × Ukrainian gas turbines (35.7 MW); 2 × MTU 1163 TB 83 diesel engines (6.5 MW)
- Speed: 29 knots (54 km/h; 33 mph)
- Range: 4,500 nautical miles (8,300 km; 5,200 mi) at 14 knots
- Complement: 250 (42 officers)
- Sensors & processing systems: Already installed before modernization Chinese made "Top Plate" style radar (moved from the aft to the forward mast during modernization) Combat management system: ZKJ-7 Air search radar: Type 381A Air/surface search radar: Type 360 Fire control radar: Type 344, Type 345, Type 347G, Type 360 Navigation radar: Racal/Decca 1290 Active sonar: DUBV-23 hull-mounted Optronic directors: GDG 776 Satellite communications Installed during modernization Towed array sonar
- Electronic warfare & decoys: Already installed before modernization Type 826 electronic support measure Type 984 jammer Type 985 jammer 2 x Type 946 chaff launchers 2 x Type 947 chaff launchers Installed during modernization Torpedo decoy
- Armament: Post-2016 modernization: 2 x 100 mm H/PJ-33B naval guns (1 twin mount); 16 x YJ-12 anti-ship missiles; 32-cell vertical launching system; HHQ-16 surface-to-air missiles; 2 x Type 1130 CIWS; 6 x 324 mm. torpedo tubes (2 triple mounts); Weapens replaced during modernization: 16 x YJ-83 anti-ship missiles; HQ-7 surface-to-air missiles (octuple launcher); 8 × 37mm AA guns (4 twin mounts)
- Aircraft carried: 2 helicopters: (Kamov Ka-28 or Harbin Z-9C)
- Aviation facilities: Hangar for two helicopters

Shenzhen is a guided-missile destroyer operated by China's People's Liberation Army Navy (PLAN). It is the sole Type 051B destroyer (NATO reporting name: Luhai).

== Development and design ==
In the 1990s and early 2000s, the PLAN began developing capabilities for a wider range of strategic missions. During this time it produced multiple warship classes with short production runs, likely as experiments to develop satisfactory designs. The Type 051B destroyer was one of these designs.

The Type 051B destroyer had "broad similarities" with the smaller preceding Type 051 destroyer. The Type 051B has a wider hull with increased stability, habitability, and armament. Integration of French and Russian systems was aided by previous experience on the Type 051 destroyer testbed. The ZKJ-7 combat data system is based on the Italian IPN-10 or -20. The light anti-aircraft guns were mounted aft to make space for the HQ-7 reloading system behind the launcher.

It was unusual in being one of the few PLAN ships to have a hangar for two helicopters.

The Type 051B was the first PLAN warship with a combined diesel or gas (CODOG) powerplant using Ukrainian gas turbines; the preceding Type 052 program had started with American General Electric LM2500 gas turbines, which could no longer be obtained after the 1989 Tiananmen Square protests and massacre.

One ship, Shenzhen, was built. The design then become the baseline for the Type 051C destroyer.

The ship emerged from a major overhaul around 2016. The quarterdeck was enclosed. The "Top Plate"-derived radar was moved from the aft to the forward mast to remove its blind spot. The ship was rearmed with YJ-12 anti-ship missiles, and HHQ-16 surface-to-air missiles in a vertical launching system (VLS). Stern-deployed torpedo decoy and towed array sonar systems were installed.

== History ==
Shenzhen was commissioned in December 1998 and served as a flagship for the South Sea Fleet. It made the PLAN's first goodwill visit to Africa in 2000. The ship also took part in the PLAN's first visit to Europe in 2001 and the first visit to Japan in 2007.

The ship was refitted in 2004.

Shenzhen was part of the second Chinese anti-piracy task force to the Gulf of Aden from April to August 2009. On the return journey it visited Pakistan and India.

The ship was overhauled from 2014 through 2016 at Zhanjiang.

== Gallery ==
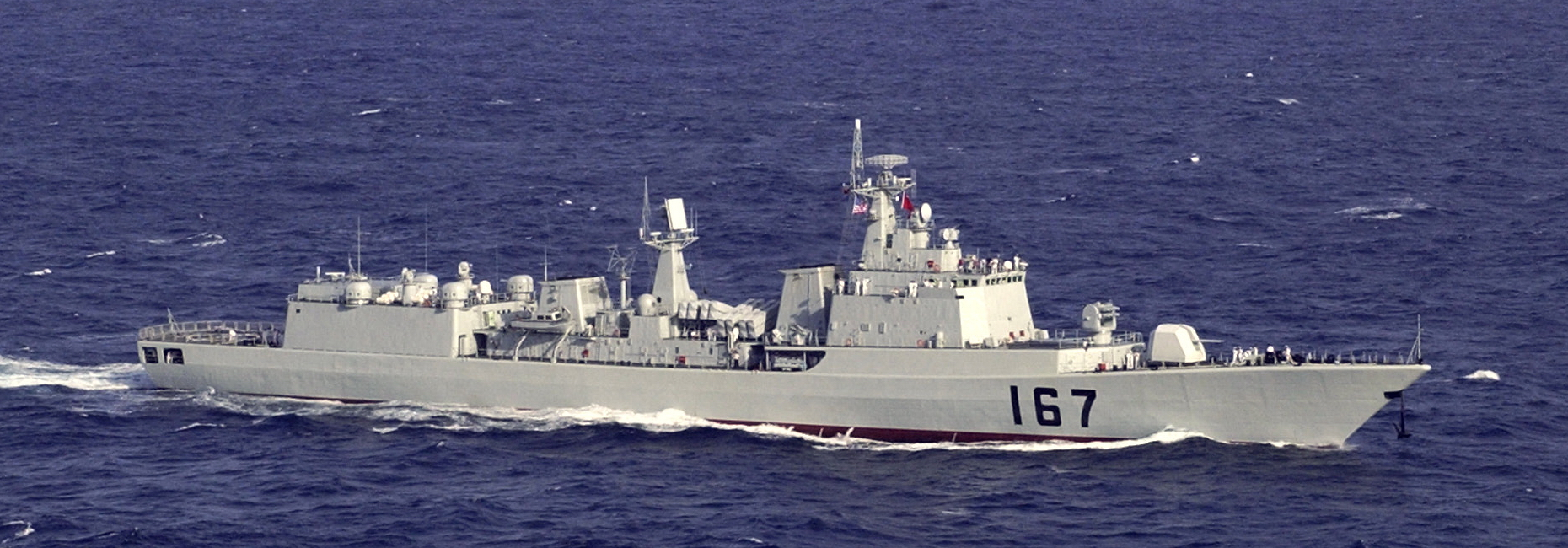
Shenzhen entering Apra Harbor, Guam on 12 October 2003.

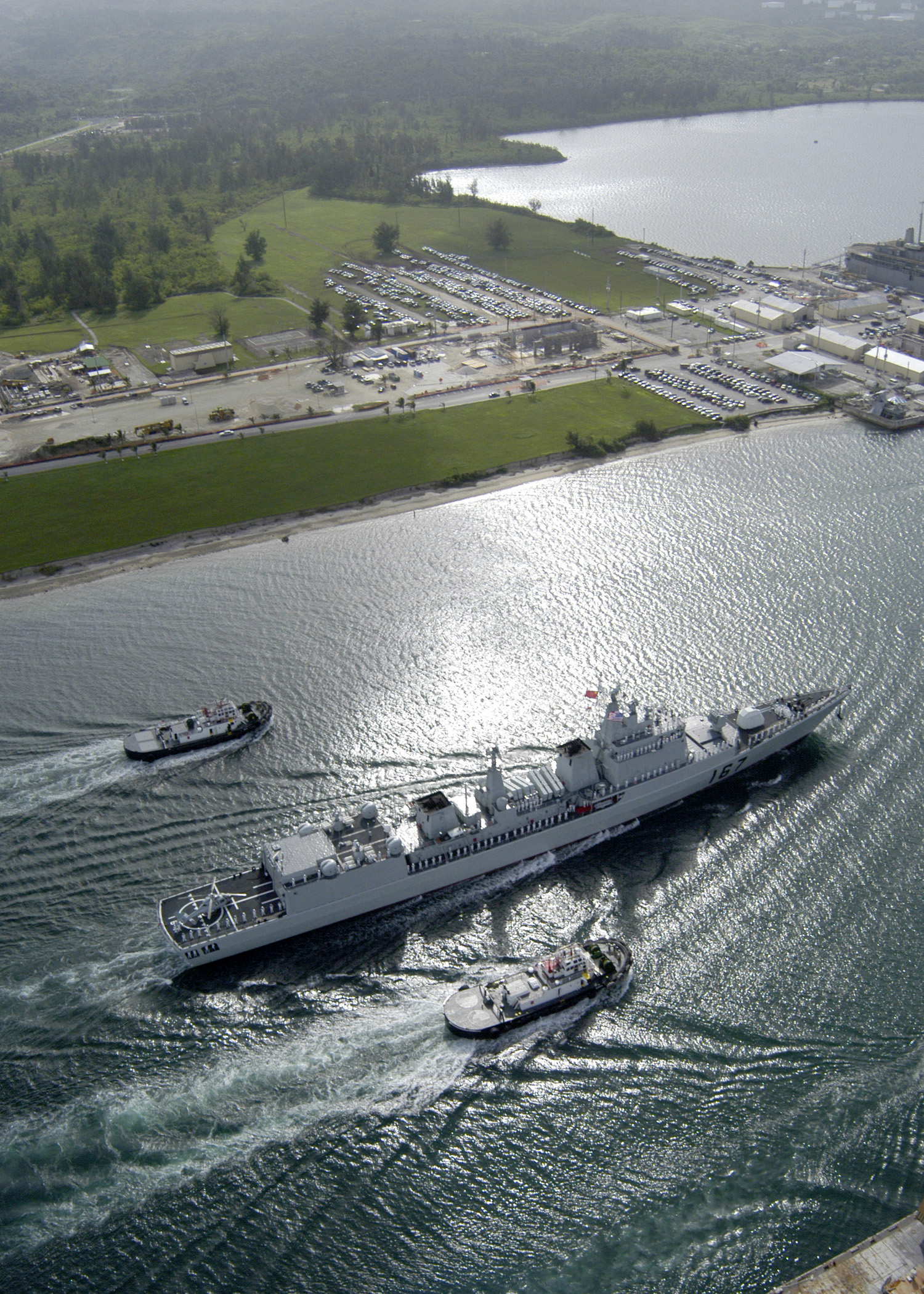
Shenzhen in Apra Harbor, Guam on 22 October 2003.

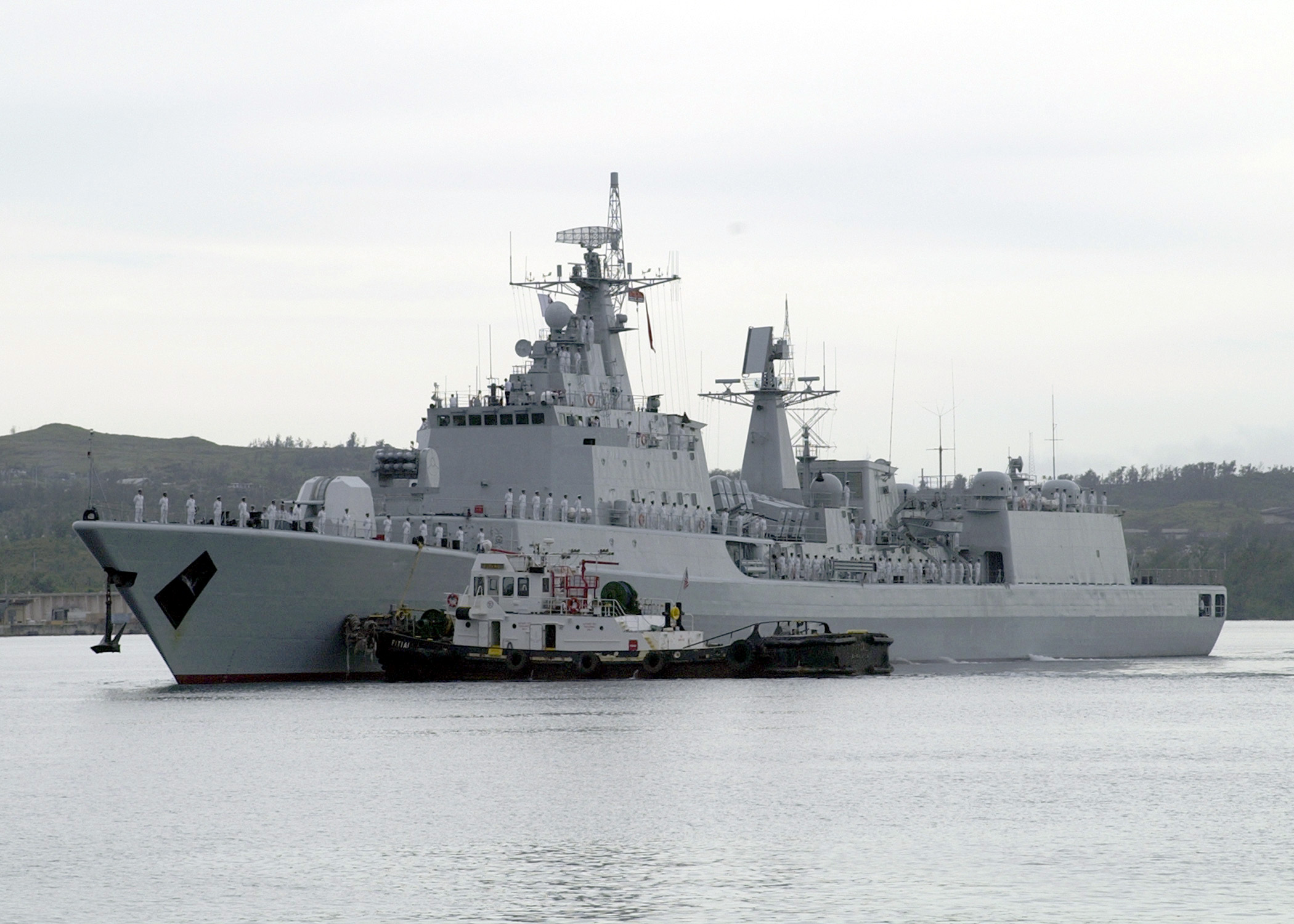
Shenzhen in Apra Harbor, Guam on 25 October 2003.

== Sources ==
- Carlson, Christopher P. (March 2020). "PLAN Force Structure Projection Concept, A Methodology for Looking Down Range". China Maritime Report (10). China Maritime Studies Institute.
- Gormley, Dennis M.; Erickson, Andrew S.; Yuan, Jingdong (2014). A Low-Visibility Force Multiplier: Assessing China's Cruise Missile Ambitions (PDF) (Report). Washington, D.C.: National Defense University Press.
- Kirchberger, Sarah (2015). Assessing China's Naval Power: Technological Innovation, Economic Constraints, and Strategic Implications. Global Power Shift. Springer. ISBN 978-3-662-47127-2.
- McDevitt, Michael (2017). "The Modern PLA Navy Destroyer Force". CSMI Red Book. 14. United States Naval War College: 55–65. ISBN 978-1-935352-45-7.
- Saunders, Stephan, ed. (2015). Jane's Fighting Ships 2015-2016. Jane's Information Group. ISBN 978-0710631435.
