= Type 364 radar =

Type 364
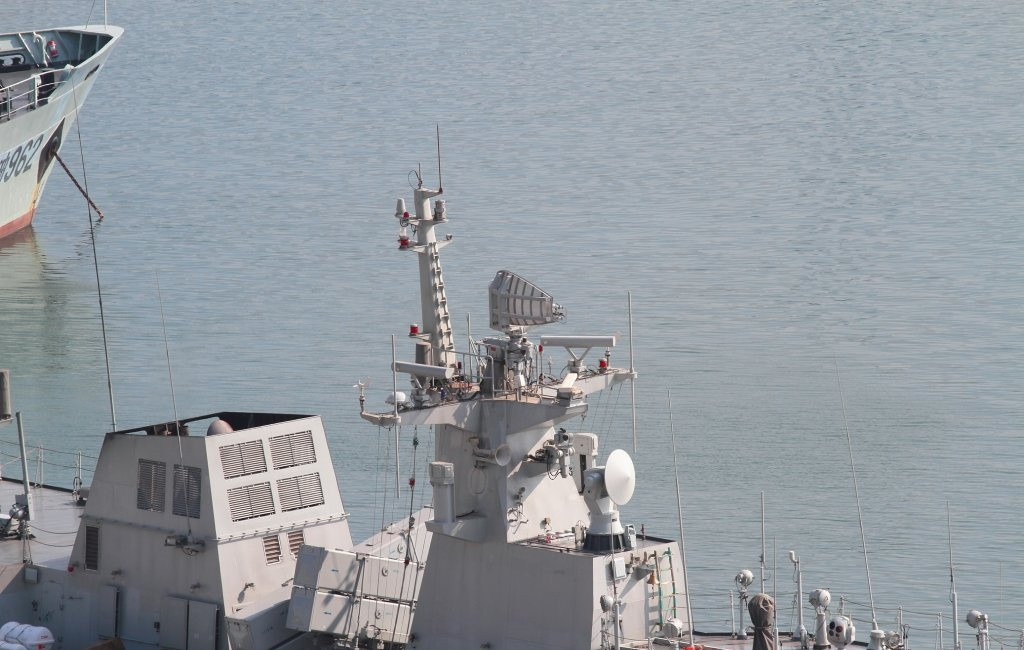
- Type 364 antenna on board Type 056 corvette
- Country of origin: People's Republic of China
- Type: Air Search
- Frequency: G/H band
- Range: 75km
- Other names: Seagull-C, SR64-C

The Type 364 radar was developed by the Yangzhou Marine Electronic Instruments Research Institute (扬州船用电子仪器研究所) / No. 723 Research Institute. It is typically enclosed in a dome on new PLA-N's frigates and destroyers.

An improved version of the earlier Type 360, it replaces the Yagi IFF antenna with a planar IFF configuration and moves to higher frequencies in order to achieve better target discrimination. The dome is also expected to improve azimuth resolution.

It is expected to be used primarily for CIWS (Type 730, Type 630, HQ-10) targeting with secondary air search and SSM targeting abilities.

It is offered for sale through the China Shipbuilding Industry Corporation (CSIC).

== Specifications ==
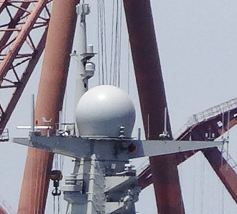
Type 364 radar on a 052D destroyer

- System: Coherent pulse compression (CPC), adaptive moving target detector (AMTD)
  - Band: S band
  - Range: 75km against 2 square meter RCS aircraft; 12km against 0.1 square meter RCS target
  - Beam width: 2°(H), 25° (V)
  - Scan coverage: 360°×25°
- Processing capacity
  - Multiple tracking: ≥20pcs
- Antenna
  - Mast weight: 520 kg
  - Type: Incision parabolic antenna
  - Gain: 38dB
  - Rotation speed: 30RPM
- Transmitter / Receiver
  - Frequency: S-band
  - Consumption: 100w (avg.) 60kW (peak)
  - NF: <3dB
- Friend/Foe Transponder
  - Gain: 20dB
  - Beam width: 1°×30°
- Ambient temperature
  - Antenna: -25°C~+70°C
- Power supply
  - AC: 220VAC (150~250 VAC)
  - Power consumption: 10kW

== See also ==
- Type 054 Ma'anshan class frigate
- Type 052B Guangzhou-class
- Type 052C Lanzhou-class
- Type 051C Luzhou-class
