= Type 051C destroyer =

Class of guided missile destroyers operated by the Chinese People's Liberation Army Navy

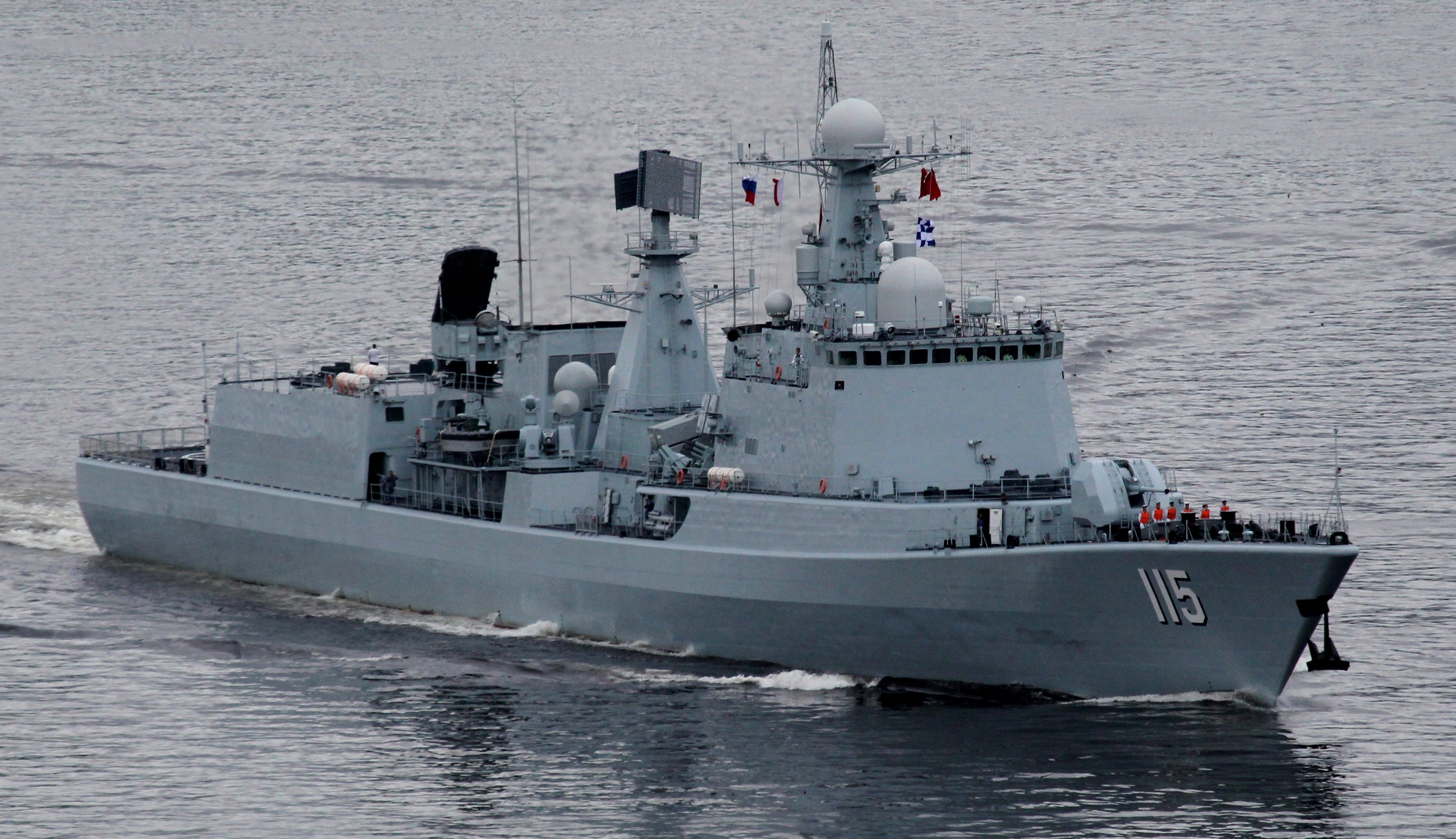
- Shenyang entering Vladivostok on 25 August 2015

Class overview
- Builders: Dalian Shipbuilding Industry Company
- Operators: People's Liberation Army Navy Surface Force
- Preceded by: Type 051B (based on hull family); Type 052C (based on commissioning date)
- Succeeded by: Type 052D (based on commissioning date)
- Built: 2003–2007
- In service: 2006–present
- Planned: 2
- Completed: 2
- Active: 2

General characteristics
- Type: Guided-missile destroyer
- Displacement: 7,100 tons
- Length: 155 m (508 ft 6 in)
- Beam: 17.1 m (56 ft 1 in)
- Draught: 6 m (19 ft 8 in)
- Propulsion: 2 indigenous steam turbines
- Speed: 30 knots
- Sensors & processing systems: Fregat-MAE-5 (Top Plate) 3D air search phased array radar; Type 364 (SR64) surface search radar; Mineral-ME (Band Stand) over-the-horizon targeting radar; Tombstone 3D phased-array target tracking radar; Type 347G I-band fire-control radars
- Armament: 48 × S-300FM (SA-N-20) surface-to-air missiles (6 x 8 revolver-style VLS); 8 × YJ-83 anti-ship missiles; 1 × 100 mm H/PJ-87 dual purpose gun; 2 × Type 730 30 mm seven-barrel Gatling gun close-in weapons systems; 2 × 3 324 mm torpedo launchers carrying Yu-7 torpedoes; 2 × 15 Type 946 decoy launchers; 2 × 18 Type 726-4 decoy launchers
- Aircraft carried: Kamov Ka-28 Helix-size helicopter
- Aviation facilities: No hangar

The Type 051C destroyer (NATO reporting name: Luzhou class) is a long-range air-defence guided-missile destroyer built by China in its ongoing effort to create a true blue water navy. The ship uses the hull design of the older Type 051B (Luhai class), but is equipped with the advanced Russian S-300FM air defence missiles systems. Currently, two ships of this class have been launched and deployed by People's Liberation Army Navy North Sea Fleet.

== Background ==
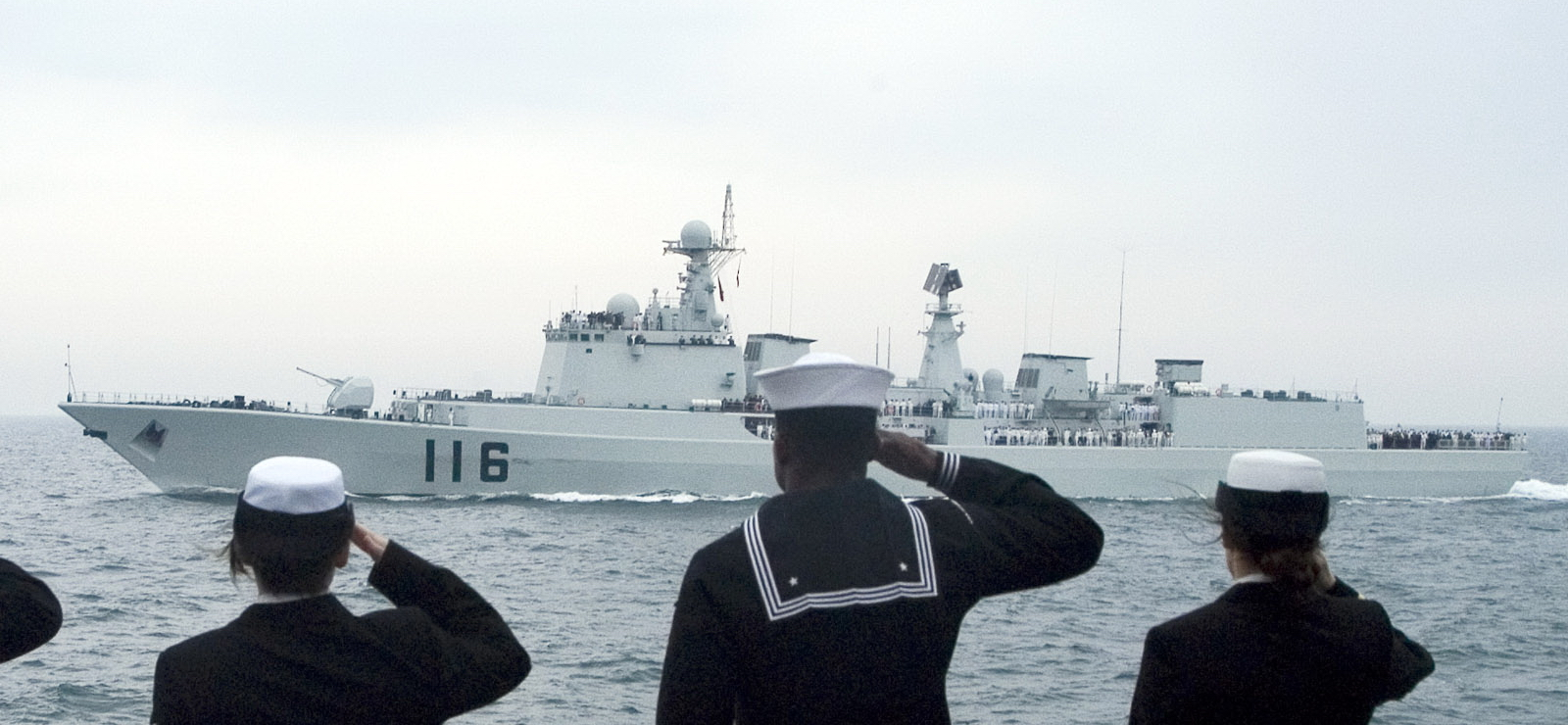
Type 051C destroyer Shijiazhuang coming alongside Arleigh Burke-class destroyer USS Fitzgerald on 23 April 2009

The construction of the Type 051C destroyer at China's northern Dalian Shipyard was revealed in 2004 with the help of Internet photographs. A disadvantage of the Type 051C is that it lacks the stealthier radar cross-section found on the newer Chinese warships.

The ship also possesses less advanced steam turbine propulsion compared to gas turbine propulsion present in all newer Chinese destroyers. The Type 051C is a stop gap measure to provide long range area air defense to the fleet by mating the mature hull design with proven SAM system that is more capable than that of the Type 052B destroyer. Production of this class stopped once more advanced Type 052C destroyers became available.

== Description ==
=== Missiles ===
The Type 051C uses the advanced Russian S-300FM air defence missile system with track-via-missile homing guided by a single Tombstone radar. The missile has a maximum range of 150 km and an operating altitude of 10 m - 27 km.

The anti-ship abilities possessed by the Type 051C includes eight indigenous YJ-83 (C-803) anti-ship missiles. This anti-ship missile has a range of over 150 kilometres (93 mi) and approaches its target in sea skimming mode at a speed of Mach 1.5. As a secondary role, the missile can also be used against land targets.

=== Guns ===
The ship uses two Type 730 CIWS guns for air defence. The Type 730 is a CIWS that is also installed on the Type 052B and Type 052C/052D destroyers, and the Type 054A frigates. The ship also has 100 mm gun based on a French design for use against surface targets.

=== Sensors ===
The S-300FM missile is guided by the Volna (NATO codename: Tomb Stone) 3D phased-array target tracking radar installed on top of the stern deckhouse. The radar can direct 12 missiles to engage 6 targets simultaneously. Since two radars are required to give 360° coverage, this means that there is a blind gap on Type 051C in full SAM cover in the forward quadrant, resulting in a major tactical restriction.

The air search radar is a Fregat-MAE-5 (NATO reporting name: Top Plate) 3D air search radar mounted at the top of the rear mast, offering two channels in E-band. The radar can track up to 40 targets simultaneously, and has a maximum range of 120 nmi to aircraft and 20 nmi to sea-skimming missile.

There is also a large round radome mounted at the top of the front mast, housing a Type 364 (SR64) surface search radar.

A large round radome installed on top of the bridge houses the Mineral-ME (NATO reporting name: Band Stand) radar that provides anti-ship missile control and over-the-horizon radar acquisition and target designation of surface ships.

There are two indigenous Type 347G (EFR-1) I-band radars integrated with the Type 730 CIWS to provide fire-control.

=== Propulsion ===
The ships are powered by two indigenous steam turbine engines giving them a top speed of 30 knots.

== Ships of class ==
Number	Pennant number	Name	Namesake	Builder	Launched	Commissioned	Fleet	Status
1	115	沈阳 / Shenyang	City of Shenyang, provincial capital of Liaoning	Dalian	28 December 2004	1 January 2006	North Sea Fleet	Active
2	116	石家庄 / Shijiazhuang	City of Shijiazhuang, provincial capital of Hebei	Dalian	26 July 2005	22 January 2007	North Sea Fleet	Active

== See also ==
- List of destroyer classes in service

Equivalent destroyers of the same era

- Akizuki class
- Chungmugong Yi Sun-sin class
