= Type 730 CIWS =

Chinese automated close-in weapons system

Type 730 / Type 1130 CIWS
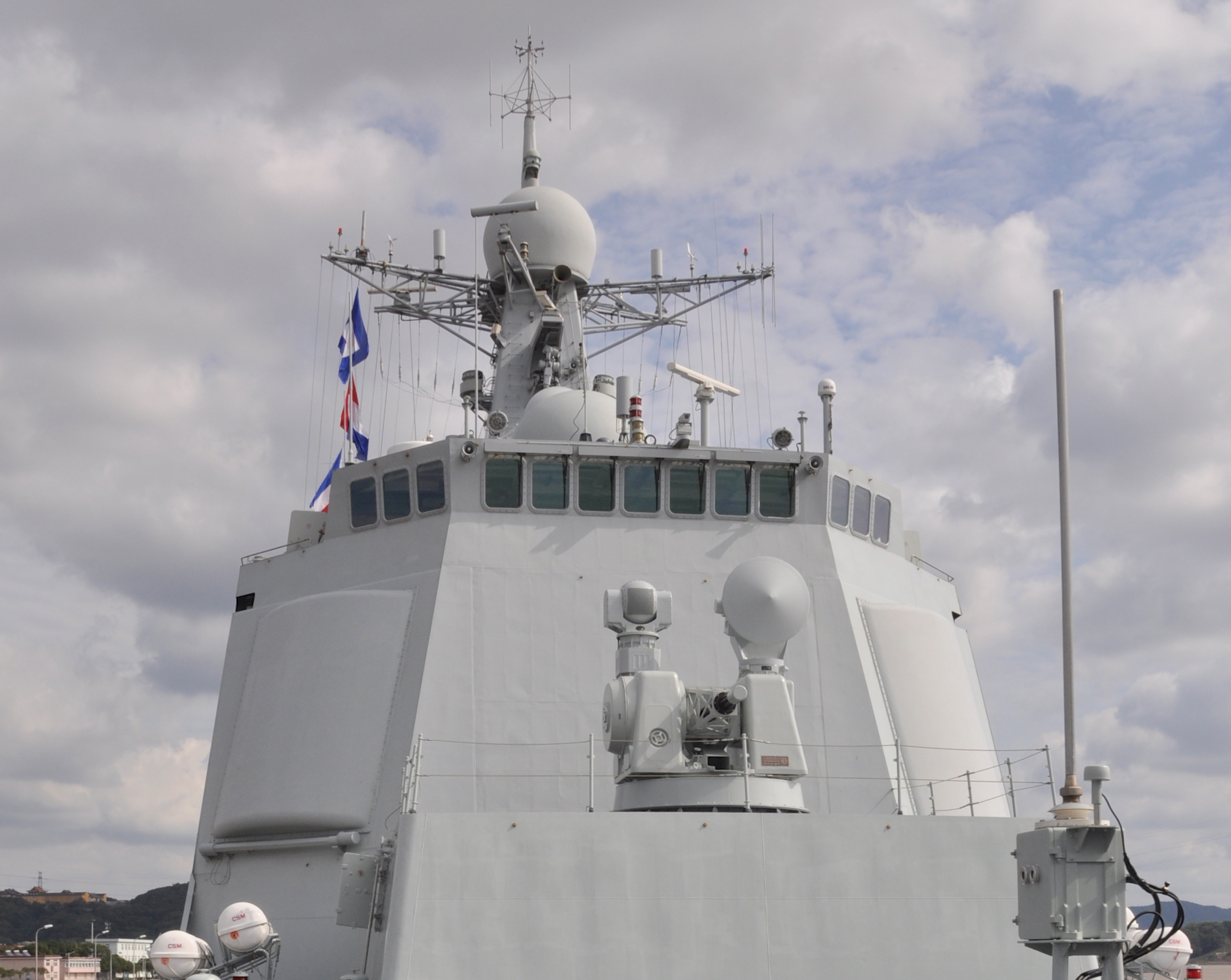
- Type 730 CIWS on board Chinese destroyer Changchun (150)
- Type: Close-in weapon system
- Place of origin: China

Service history
- In service: 2003–present
- Used by: See operators

Production history
- Designer: 713th Research Institute
- Produced: 2003–present

Specifications
- Crew: Automated, with human oversight
- Shell: HEI-Frag, Frag-T, APFSDS
- Caliber: 30×165mm
- Barrels: 7-barrel (Type 730); 11-barrel (Type 1130)
- Elevation: +85° ... -25°
- Rate of fire: 5,800 rounds/minute (Type 730); 10,000+ rounds/minute (Type 1130)
- Muzzle velocity: 1,000–1,150 m/s (3,300–3,800 ft/s)
- Effective firing range: 3–4 km (1.9–2.5 mi) (aerial); 4–5 km (2.5–3.1 mi) (maritime)
- Maximum firing range: 5 km (3.1 mi)
- Feed system: Type 730: One ammunition boxes, holding 1280 rounds Type 730B/C, LD-2000: Two ammunition boxes, each holding 500 rounds (total 1000 rounds) Type 1130: Two ammunition boxes, each holding 1280 rounds (total 2560 rounds)
- Main armament: 1 × 30 mm H/PJ-12 or H/PJ-11 Gatling gun
- Guidance system: TR47C J-band radar OFC-3 electro-optical fire control system

The Type 730 is a Chinese seven-barrelled 30 mm Gatling gun/rotary cannon CIWS. It has a PLA Navy designation H/PJ12. It is mounted in an enclosed automatic turret and directed by radar, and electro-optical tracking systems. The maximum rate of fire is 5800 rd/m, and the effective range is up to 3 km.

== Development ==
The is designed by the 713th research institute under the name 'Project 850' and is powered by two electric motors. The radar TR47C is a derivative of the EFR-1/LR66 J-band radar (NATO code name: Rice Lamp) by Xi'an Research Institute of Navigation Technology, but it is unclear that if this derivative is developed by the same institution. The OFC (Optical Fire Control)-3/H/ZGJ-4 electro-optical fire control system is designed by the Central China Optronic (electro-optical) Research Institute.

=== Origin ===
The system's primary purpose is defense against anti-ship missiles, and other precision guided weapons. However, it can also be employed against fixed/rotary wing aircraft, ships and other small craft, coastal targets, and floating mines. Though externally similar to the Dutch Goalkeeper in appearance, it is thought to operate indigenous radar and optical systems. Another reported source of technology was reported to be in France, which had experimented with the same General Electric EX-83 mount for their CIWS requirements. Two systems, SAGEM's SAMOS and the Thomson-CSF's SATAN were under evaluation in October 1987. The SAGEM SAMOS system featured the EX-83 mount with a SAGEM VOLCAN optical director, while the Thomson-CSF variant was controlled with an off-board Castor IIJ fire-control radar. Photos of the prototype Type 730 unit under trial apparently shows a SAGEM VOLCAN EO director in place of the domestic OFC-3/H/ZGJ-4 EO director.

== Design ==
=== Radar ===
The TR47C radar operates in the same way of AN/APY-1/2 radar on board E-3 Sentry in that the azimuth is scanned mechanically, while the elevation is scanned electronically, incorporating a total of 169 transceivers of phased array technology that enables the radar to pick up the splashes of 30 mm rounds. Like the western CIWS, the information is processed on site, via local computers of the radar and the gun mount, thus providing faster reaction time than the Russian design in which the radar and fire control system are separately located.

The system can track a sea-skimming target with 0.1 square metre radar cross section at 8 km, extended to 15 km if the radar cross section is increased to 2 square metres, and further extended to 20 km if the radar cross section is increased to 10 square metres, though the targets could not be engaged until much closer (3 km) due to the limited range of the gun.

=== Fire-control system ===
The OFC-3 system is modular design that comprises a laser range finder, a color TV camera, and an IR camera. The laser range finder can be replaced by a laser designator (for a laser beam-riding SAM), the TV camera can be replaced by a night vision camera, and the IR camera can be replaced by an ImIR, at higher cost. Development to incorporate the dual band IR, night vision camera, and the color TV camera is reportedly in progress.

Type 730 CIWS is an autonomous closed-loop system and thus offers faster reaction time than the Russian AK-630. Type 730 CIWS is fully compatible with Chinese and European combat data systems such as ZKJ-1, ZKJ-4, ZKJ-4A-3, ZKJ-5, ZKJ-6, ZKJ-7, H/ZBJ-1, and Thomson-CSF TAVITAC, and can be directly integrated with these combat data systems without any modification.

=== Armament ===
The 30 mm Gatling gun mount designated as H/PJ-12 is extremely similar to the General Electric GAU-8/A Avenger. Although there are sources claiming that it is the Chinese version of the Russian Gryazev-Shipunov GSh-6-30 Gatling gun, this appears to be unlikely, since the Russian Gatling gun uses bleed gas actuation. H/PJ-12 is versatile in that its FCS can be either separately installed at different locations like the Soviet AK-630, or directly integrated on the gun mount. Like the American GAU-8/A Avenger, it is recommended not to fire longer than a single minute at a rate of 4,200 rounds per minute, after which the generated heat would begin melting the rifling of the barrels, shortening its useful life. Rates of fire beyond 4,200 rounds per minute increase wear. There are one (Type 730) or two (Type 730B/C, LD-2000) ammunition drums each contains 640 (Type 730) or 500 (Type 730B/C, LD-2000) rounds, and other versions of the ammunition drums have been reportedly developed.

== Deployment ==
The system has been fitted on board the Type 052 (after 2011 refit), Type 052B, Type 052C, Type 052D and Type 051C destroyers, the F-22P and Type 054A frigates, and the Parchim-I and C28A corvettes so far, and may replace some Type 76 mounts on older combatants.

The Type 1130 has been deployed on aircraft carriers Liaoning and Shandong, Type 055 destroyers, Type 075 landing helicopter docks, later variants of Type 052D destroyers and Type 054A frigates, and Type 051B destroyers (after 2011 refit).

The LD-2000 has been deployed by the People's Liberation Army Ground Force and Marines for local air defense missions.

== Variants ==
=== Type 730 ===
Original variant.

=== Type 730B ===
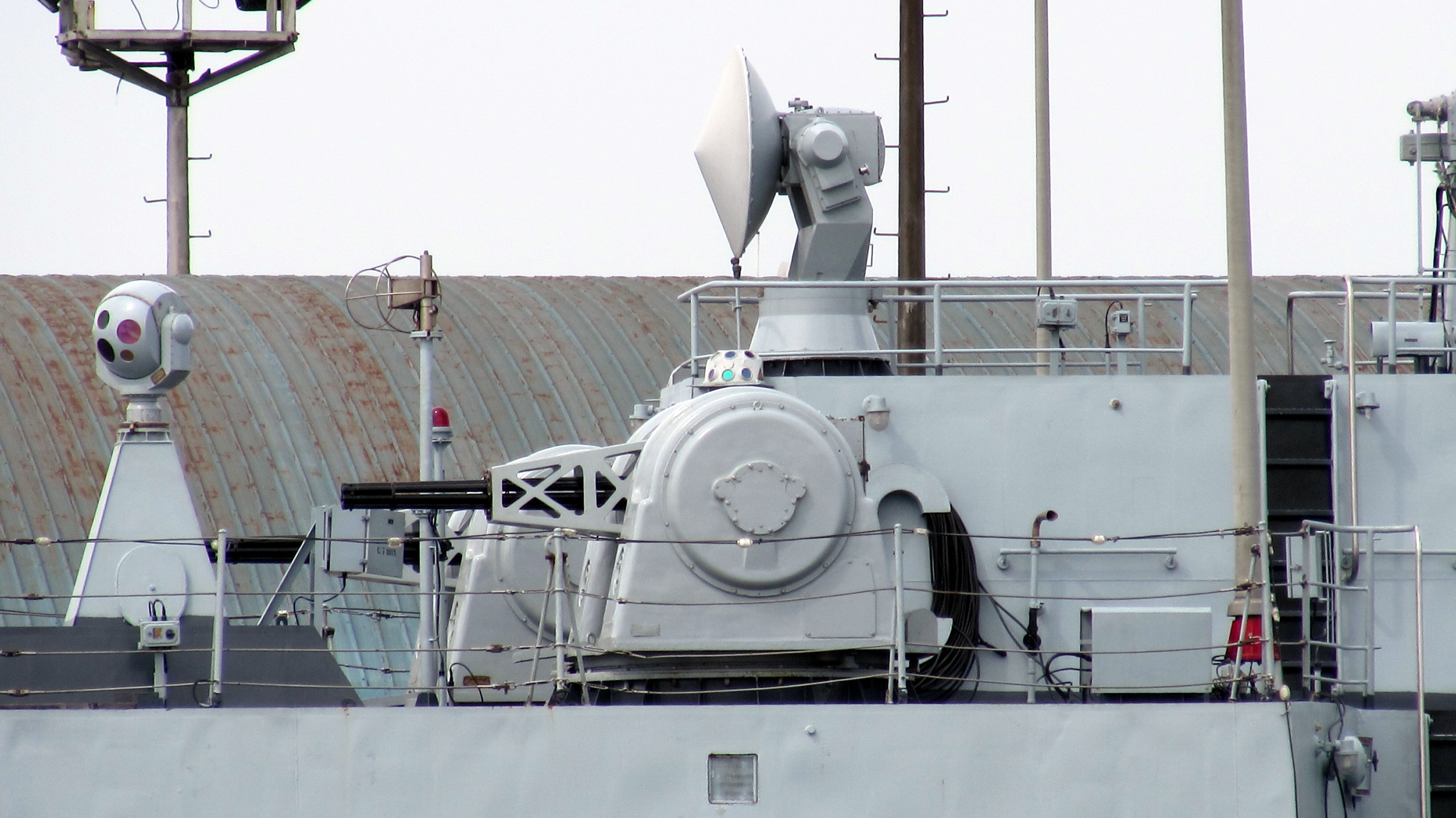
Type 730B CIWS onboard Pakistani frigate PNS Saif (F253)

Re-engineered Type 730 system to utilize off-mount target tracking sensor. The system integrates the 30 mm mounting with a network of off-mount tracking and surveillance sensors consisting of surveillance radar, fire-control radar and electro-optical sensor system.

=== Type 730C ===
Type 730C is a new variant unveiled in February 2017 that combines the existing Type 730 seven-barrelled 30 mm rotary cannon with 6x FL-3000N missiles. The system comes with LR66 tracking radar and OC8 electro-optical tracker, though not fitted on the CIWS probably due to weight and electromagnetic interference issues, to track two separate targets simultaneously (fire on one, keep track of the other); the whole system comes with the SR64A search radar. The gun carries two 500-round drums (total 1000 rounds) with firing modes of 1,000, 2,000, or 4,000 rounds per minute.

Gun effective range:

- 150 m minimum, 1400 m interception, 2500 m effective against missiles (using APDS)
- 150–3500 meters against aircraft (using HE)
- 5000 meters against surface targets (using HE)

Missile engagement envelope: 2–8 km

=== LD-2000 ===
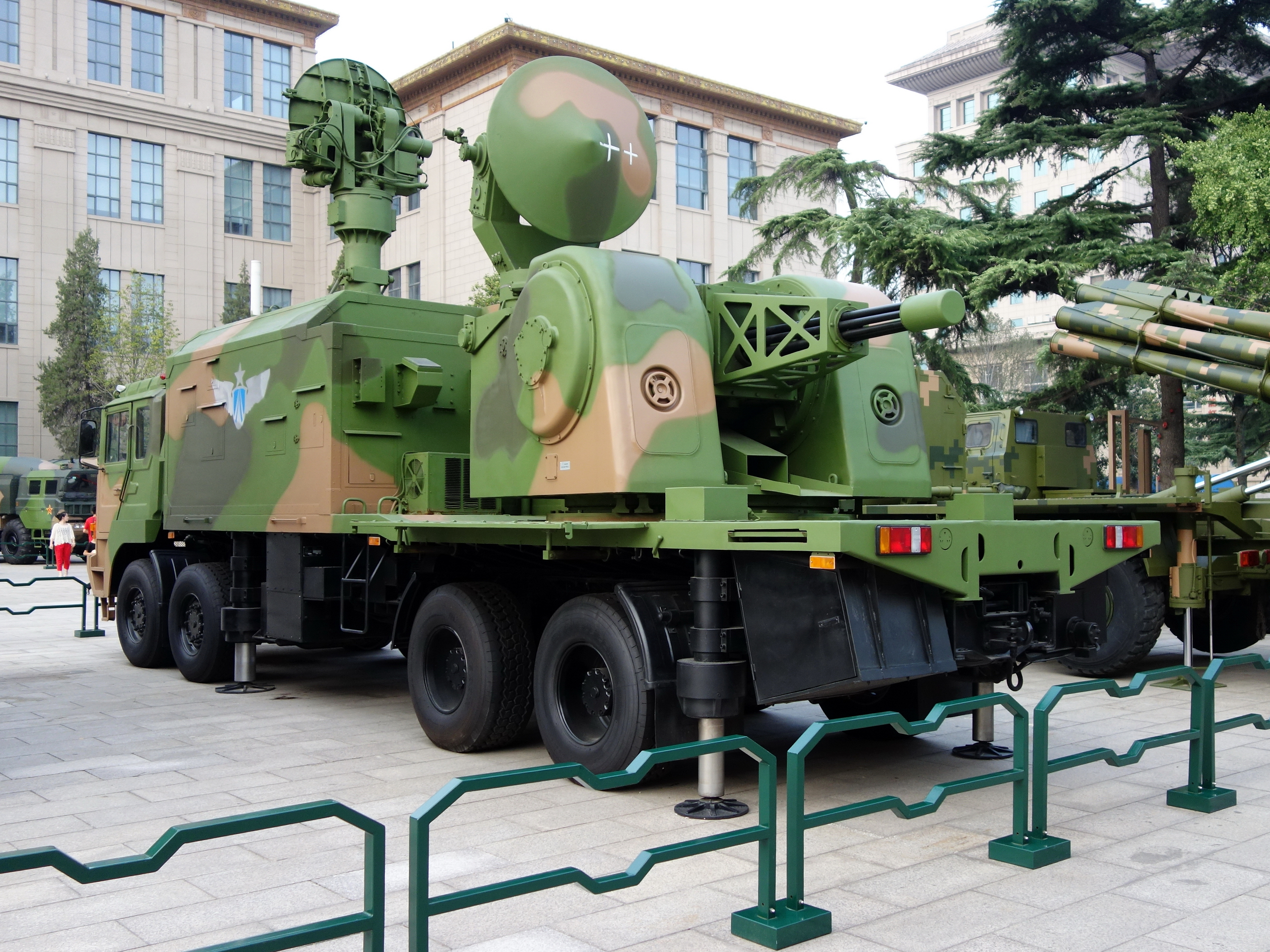
LD-2000, the land-based version of Type 730 CIWS

The LD-2000 (LD: Lu Dun, 陆盾, meaning Land Shield) SPAAGM is a Chinese developed land-based close-in weapon system with counter rocket, artillery, and mortar (C-RAM) capability. LD-2000 is based on the Chinese Navy's Type 730. Part of the HQ-6A system, it pairs with HQ-64 missiles and a Counter Battery Radar. The radar is supplemented by a thermal imaging sight. The weapon is loaded with 1,000 rounds, enough, apparently, for about 48 potential target engagements, same as its naval counterpart, with effective range of 2.5 to 3.5 km. LD-2000 and HQ-6A system is deployed by People's Liberation Army since 2011.

=== Type 1130 Golden Shield ===
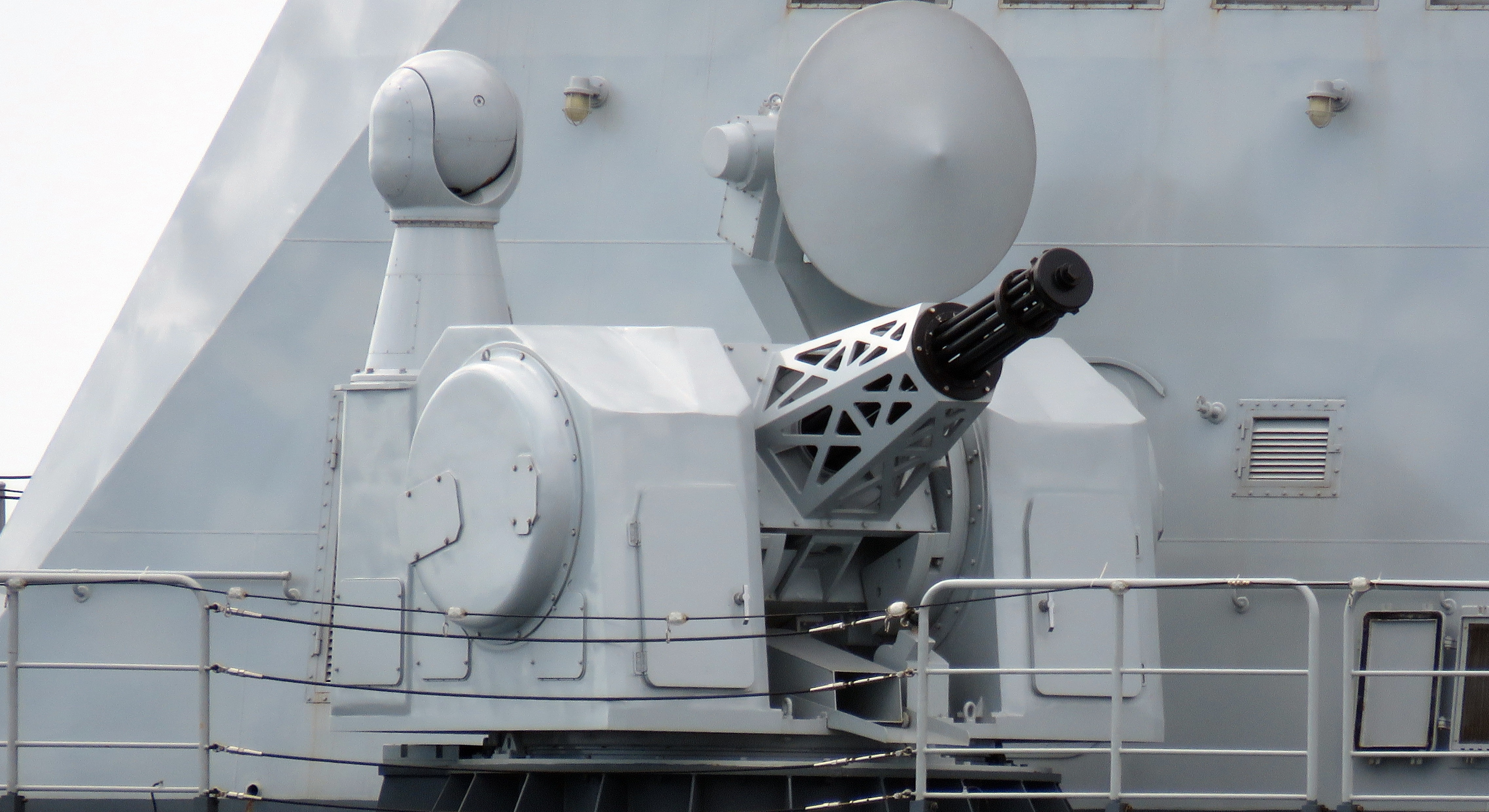
Type 1130 CIWS onboard Chinese frigate Handan (579)

Further development of Type 730 resulted in the Type 1130 Golden Shield, which first appeared on Chinese aircraft carrier Liaoning. This successor of Type 730 is also 30 mm caliber and has a total 11 barrels, with reported rate of fire of 10,000+ rounds per minute. Originally developed with 10 barrels, later productions included 11 barrels when completed. Although it is reported that FL-3000 missiles can be integrated to the gun like FCS, this has not occurred yet, and FL-3000 was installed separately on the first Chinese aircraft carrier in its own launchers. There are two ammunition drums each contains 640 rounds (total 1280 rounds).

Designated as H/PJ-11, the weapon is considered China's third generation CIWS, after the first generation Russian AK-630 and second generation indigenous Type 730. Chinese TV reported that it is able to intercept incoming anti-ship missiles up to a speed of Mach 4 with a 96% success rate.

The Type 003 Chinese aircraft carrier Fujian launched on 17 June 2022 revealed a Type 1130 CIWS with a modified radar which some have speculated to be a new AESA radar.

=== LD-3000 ===
The land-based variant of Type 1130 CIWS. First unveiled at Zhuhai Airshow 2022.

The LD-3000 is part of the HQ-11 terminal defense system, also containing a vertical missile launcher and a radar surveillance vehicle.

== Operators ==
Algeria

- Algerian Navy

Indonesia

- Indonesian Navy

Pakistan

- Pakistan Air Force: LD-2000, LD-3000.
- Pakistan Navy: Type730B, Type 1130 Golden Shield.

China

- People's Liberation Army Navy
- People's Liberation Army Ground Force
- People's Liberation Army Marine Corps

== See also ==
Comparable ground systems

- Phalanx CIWS
- Goalkeeper CIWS
- AK-630
- Kashtan CIWS
