= Chinese frigate Hengshui =

Type 054A frigate of the PLA Navy

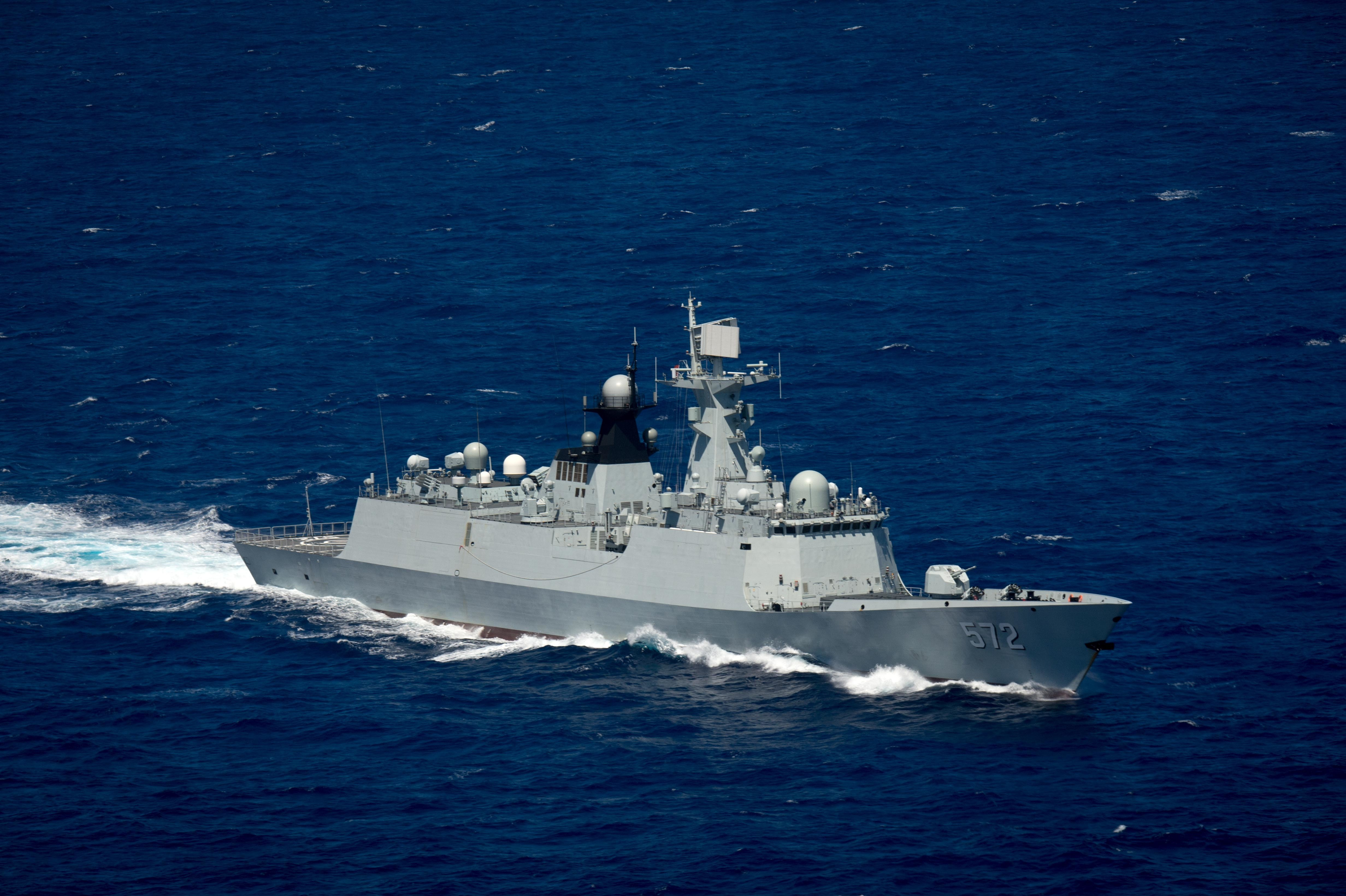
- Hengshui underway during RIMPAC 2016 on 28 July 2016

History

China
- Name: Hengshui
- Namesake: Hengshui; (衡水)
- Builder: Huangpu Shipyard, Shanghai
- Launched: 2011
- Commissioned: 9 July 2012
- Identification: Pennant number: 572
- Status: Active

General characteristics
- Class & type: Type 054A frigate
- Displacement: 4,053 tonnes (full)
- Length: 134.1 m (440 ft)
- Beam: 16 m (52 ft)
- Propulsion: CODAD, 4 × Shaanxi 16 PA6 STC diesels, 5700 kW (7600+ hp @ 1084 rpm) each
- Speed: 27 knots estimated
- Range: 8,025 nautical miles (9,235 mi; 14,862 km) estimated
- Complement: 165
- Sensors & processing systems: Type 382 Radar; Type 344 Radar (Mineral-ME Band Stand) OTH target acquisition and SSM fire control radar; 4 × Type 345 Radar (MR-90 Front Dome) SAM fire control radars; MR-36A surface search radar, I-band; Type 347G 76 mm gun fire control radar; 2 × Racal RM-1290 navigation radars, I-band; MGK-335 medium frequency active/passive sonar system; H/SJG-206 towed array sonar; ZKJ-4B/6 (developed from Thomson-CSF TAVITAC) combat data system; HN-900 Data link (Chinese equivalent of Link 11A/B, to be upgraded); SNTI-240 SATCOM; AKD5000S Ku band SATCOM
- Electronic warfare & decoys: Type 922-1 radar warning receiver; HZ-100 ECM & ELINT system; Kashtan-3 missile jamming system
- Armament: 1 × 32-cell VLS; HQ-16 SAM; Yu-8 anti submarine rocket launcher; 2 × 4 C-803 anti-ship / land attack cruise missiles; 1 × PJ26 76 mm dual purpose gun; 2 × Type 730 7-barrel 30 mm CIWS guns or Type 1130; 2 × 3 324mm Yu-7 ASW torpedo launchers; 2 × 6 Type 87 240mm anti-submarine rocket launcher (36 rockets carried); 2 × Type 726-4 18-tube decoy rocket launchers
- Aircraft carried: 1 Kamov Ka-28 'Helix' or Harbin Z-9C
- Aviation facilities: hangar

Hengshui (572) is a Type 054A frigate of the People's Liberation Army Navy. She was commissioned on 26 December 2012.

== Development and design ==
The Type 054A carries HQ-16 medium-range air defence missiles and anti-submarine missiles in a vertical launching system (VLS) system. The HQ-16 has a range of up to 50 km, with superior range and engagement angles to the Type 054's HQ-7. The Type 054A's VLS uses a hot launch method; a shared common exhaust system is sited between the two rows of rectangular launching tubes.

The four AK-630 close-in weapon systems (CIWS) of the Type 054 were replaced with two Type 730 CIWS on the Type 054A. The autonomous Type 730 provides improved reaction time against close-in threats.

== Construction and career ==
Hengshui was launched in 2011 at the Huangpu Shipyard in Shanghai. Commissioned on 9 July 2012.

On March 19, 2013, Hengshui, Lanzhou, Yulin, and Jinggang Shan form an open sea training formation that left a military port in Sanya and went to the South China Sea and the West. The Pacific Ocean and other waters conducted combat readiness patrol training in the open sea. The joint mobile formation successively sailed through the Xisha, Nansha, Zengmu Ansha, Bashi Channel, Western Pacific and other sea areas, and successively patrolled Zhubi Reef, Nanxun Reef, Dongmen Reef, Chigua Reef, Yongshu Reef and Huayang Reef. Reefs and other Nansha islands and reefs. The open sea training lasted 16 days and nights and a voyage of nearly 5,000 nautical miles. The joint mobile formation returned to the station on the morning of April 3.

On April 9, 2013, the Hengshui and Yueyang were inspected by Xi Jinping, chairman of the Central Military Commission, on behalf of the Ninth Detachment of the Destroyer. On April 10, Hengshui and Lanzhou returned to the waters of the Western Pacific to carry out offensive and defensive exercises in the open sea, including air defense, anti-submarine, and sea strikes. The formation arrived on the 118th anniversary of the signing of the Shimonoseki Treaty on April 17 and arrived in the waters near the Senkaku Islands for cruise. The open sea training lasted 11 days, with a total voyage of more than 3,000 nautical miles. Hengshui would return to a certain military port in Sanya on April 20.

On August 8, 2013, Hengshui, Jinggang Shan and Taihu formed the 15th escort fleet of the Chinese Navy from Zhanjiang City, Guangdong Province to the Gulf of Aden, Somali waters took over from the fourteenth batch of escort formations to perform escort missions. After 169 days and nights of the escort, Hengshui and others arrived in Zhanjiang on the morning of January 23, 2014 after completing the escort missions of 46 batches of 181 Chinese and foreign ships and their missions to Tanzania, Kenya, and Sri Lanka.

In mid-January 2014, the formation of Hengshui, Liuzhou, Yueyang and Sanya completed several offensive and defensive exercises in the training waters. On May 5, 2014, Hengshui and Lanzhou met with USS Blue Ridge while performing missions in the waters off Huangyan Island. On June 5, 2014, the Qiongyangpu No. 13073 fishing boat lost contact. After receiving the search and rescue order, the Hengshui ship of a destroyer detachment, which was performing a training mission in a certain area of the South China Sea, rushed to the sea area where the fishing boat was missing to conduct search and rescue operations. A search and rescue aircraft dispatched by a certain aviation unit of the South China Fleet of the Navy was the first to spot the fishing boat and report the situation to the Hengshui ship. After the Hengshui ship-borne helicopter arrived at the sea area where the incident occurred, it dropped supplies to 14 fishermen in distress on boats and life rafts. After the Hengshui ship and the South China Sea Rescue 115 arrived, they rescued all the fishermen in distress and sent them to Sanya.

Hengshui participated in RIMPAC 2016.

== Gallery ==
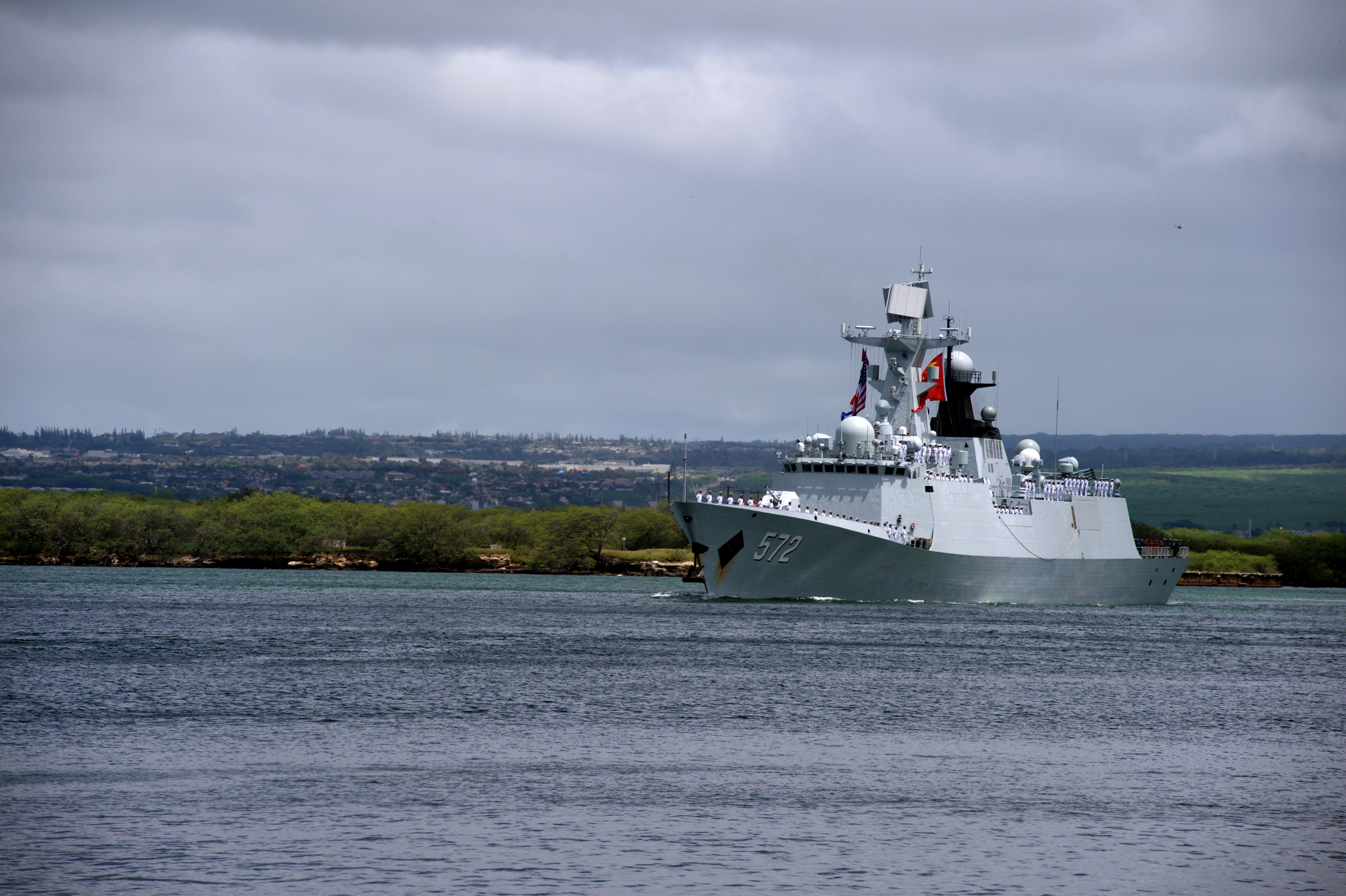
Hengshui during RIMPAC 2016

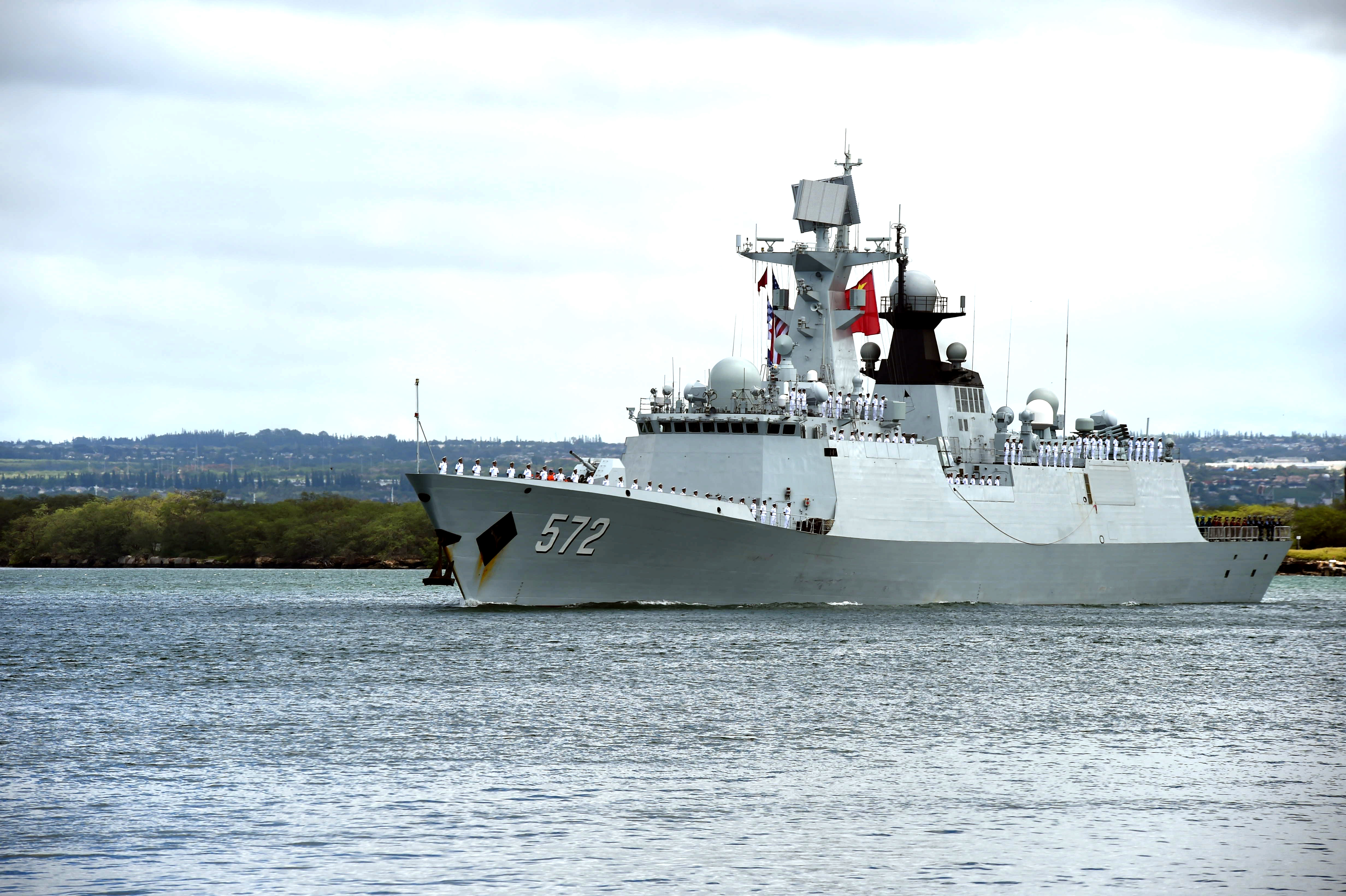

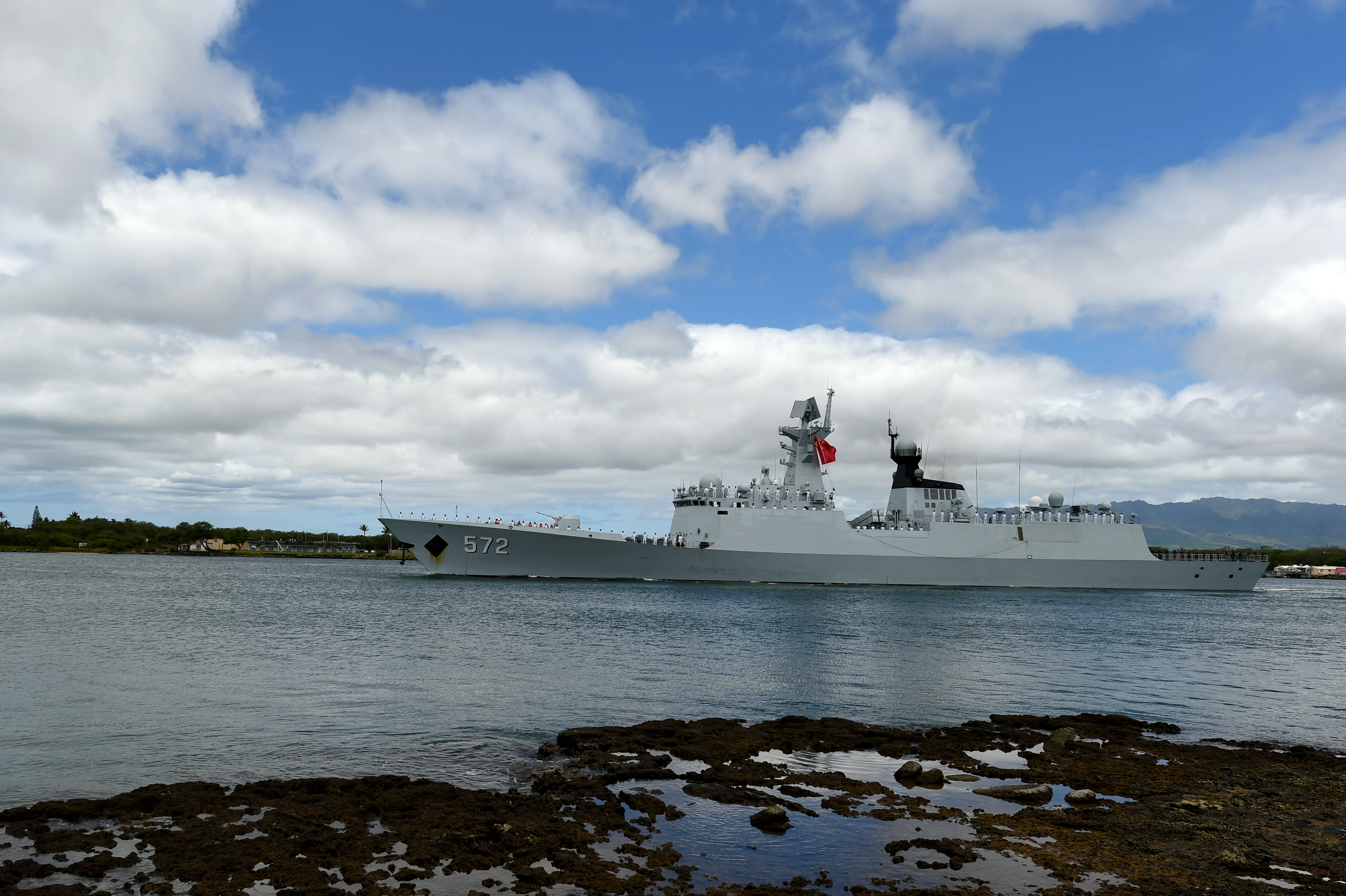

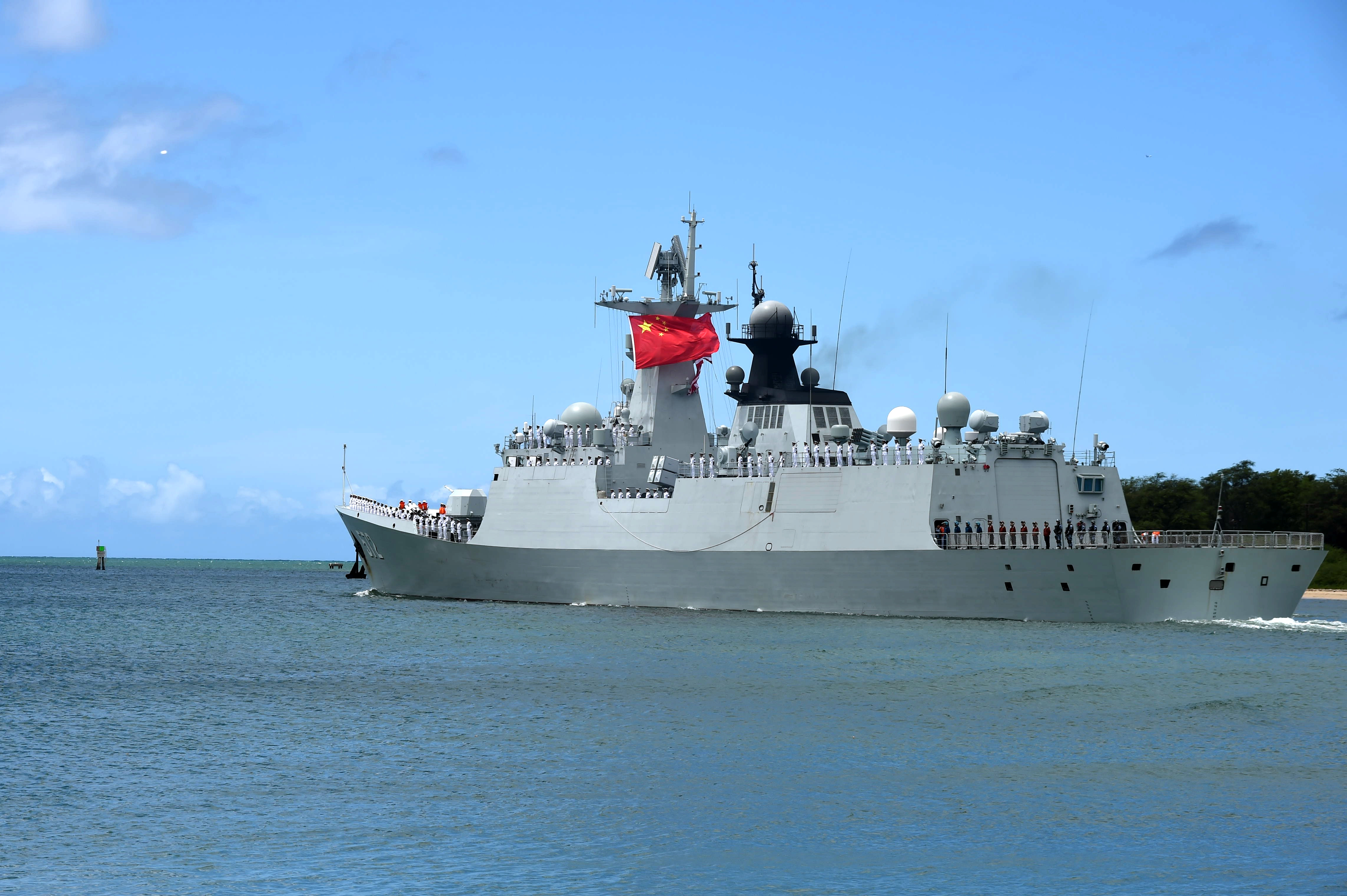

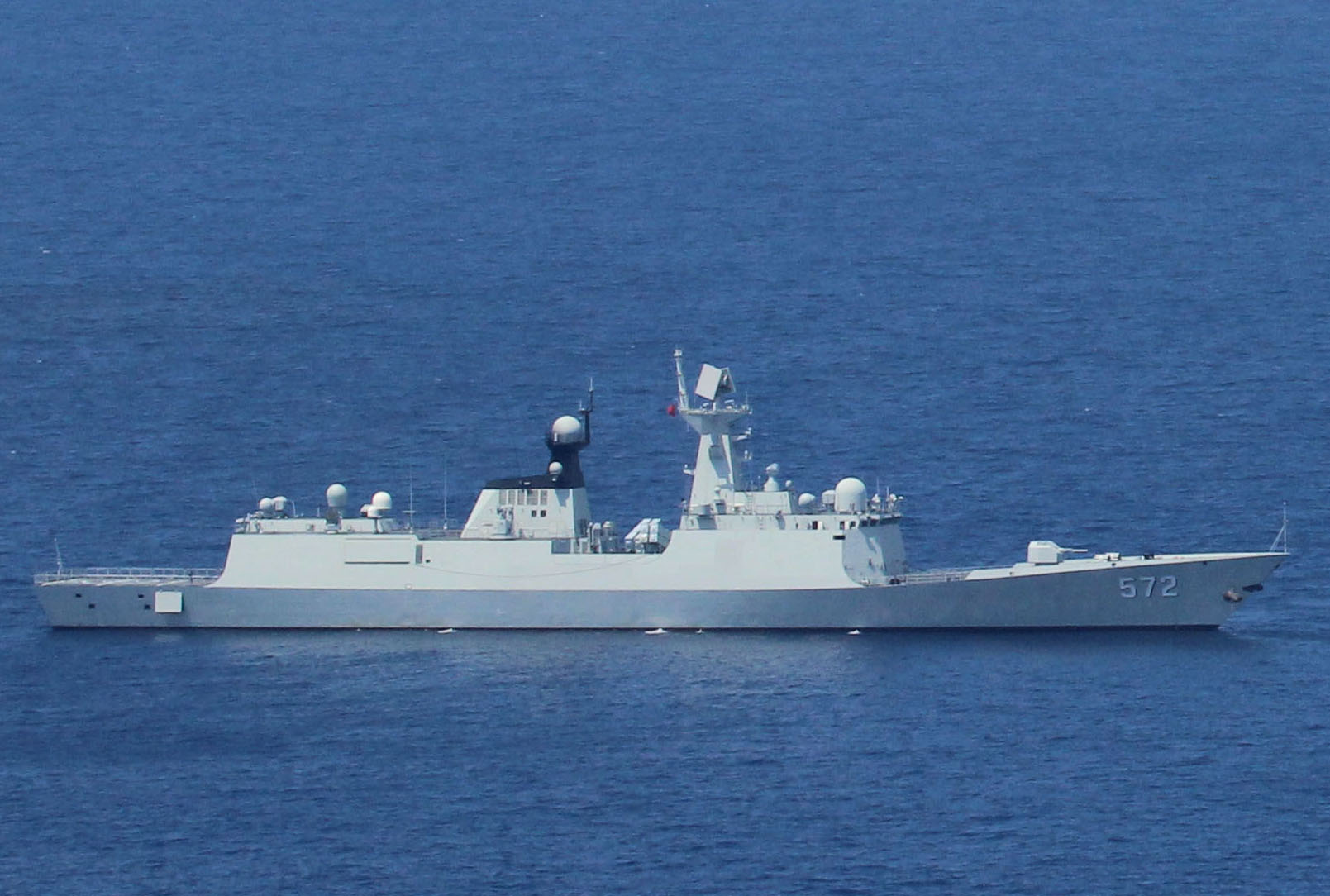

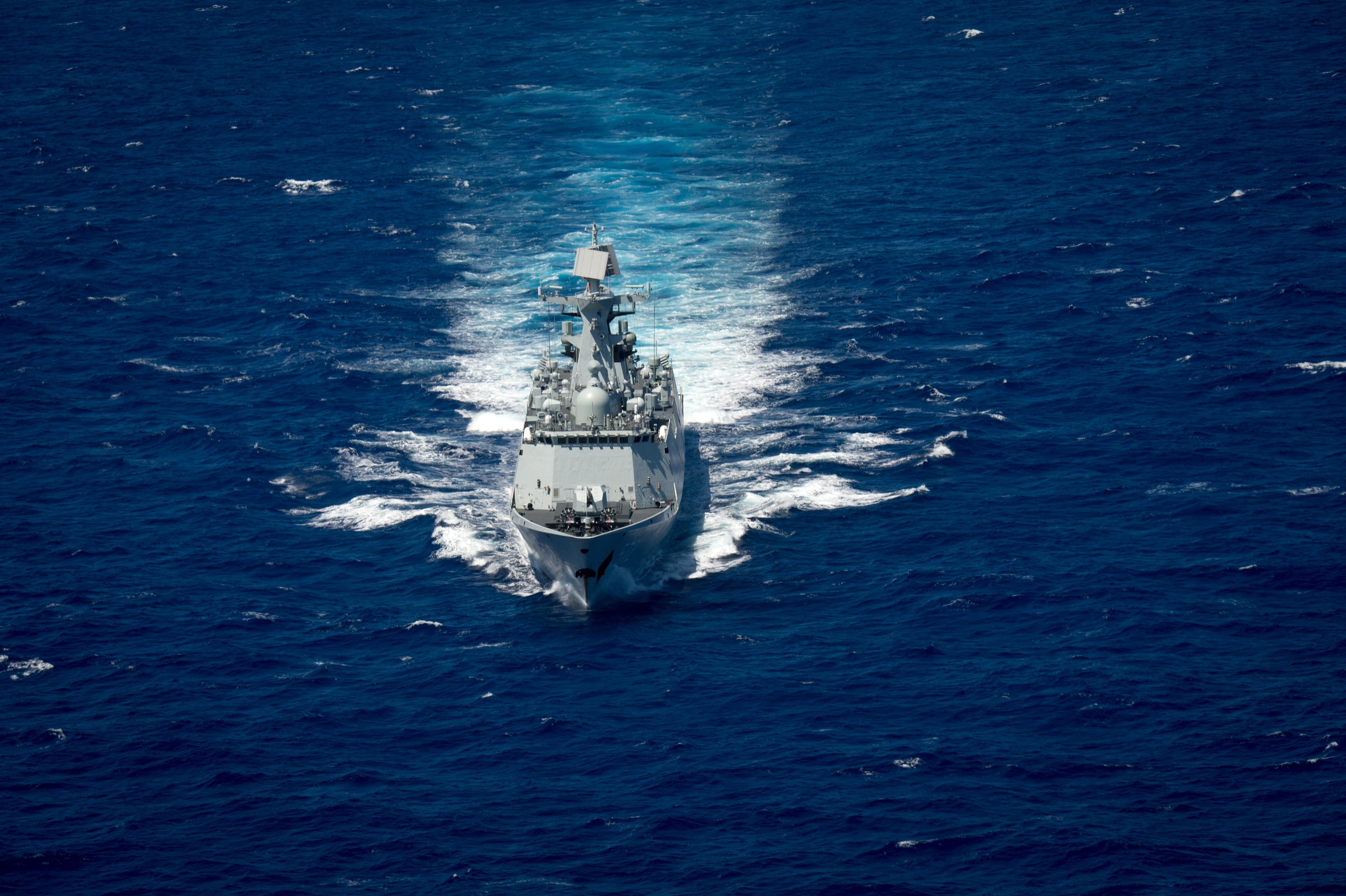

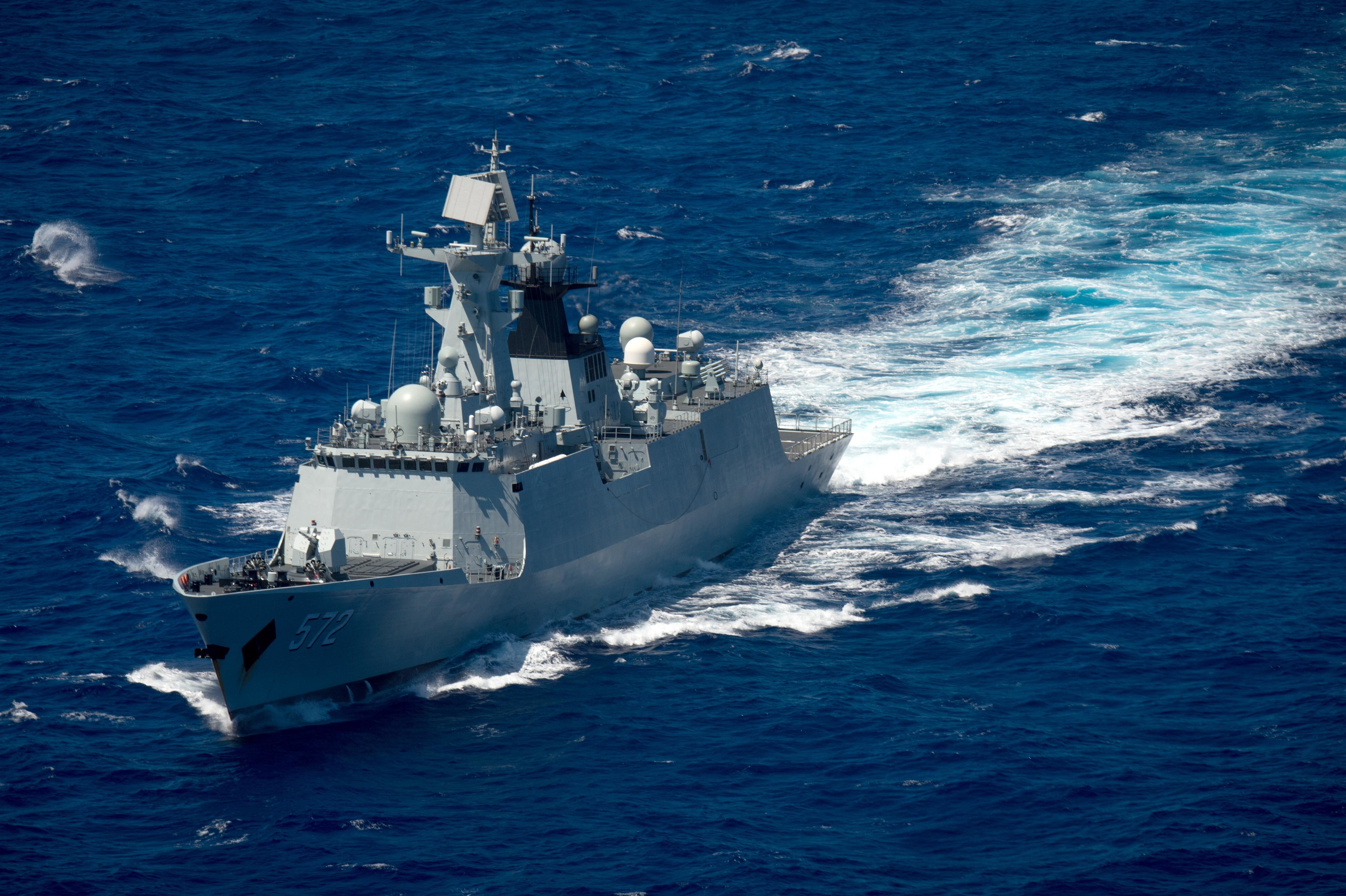

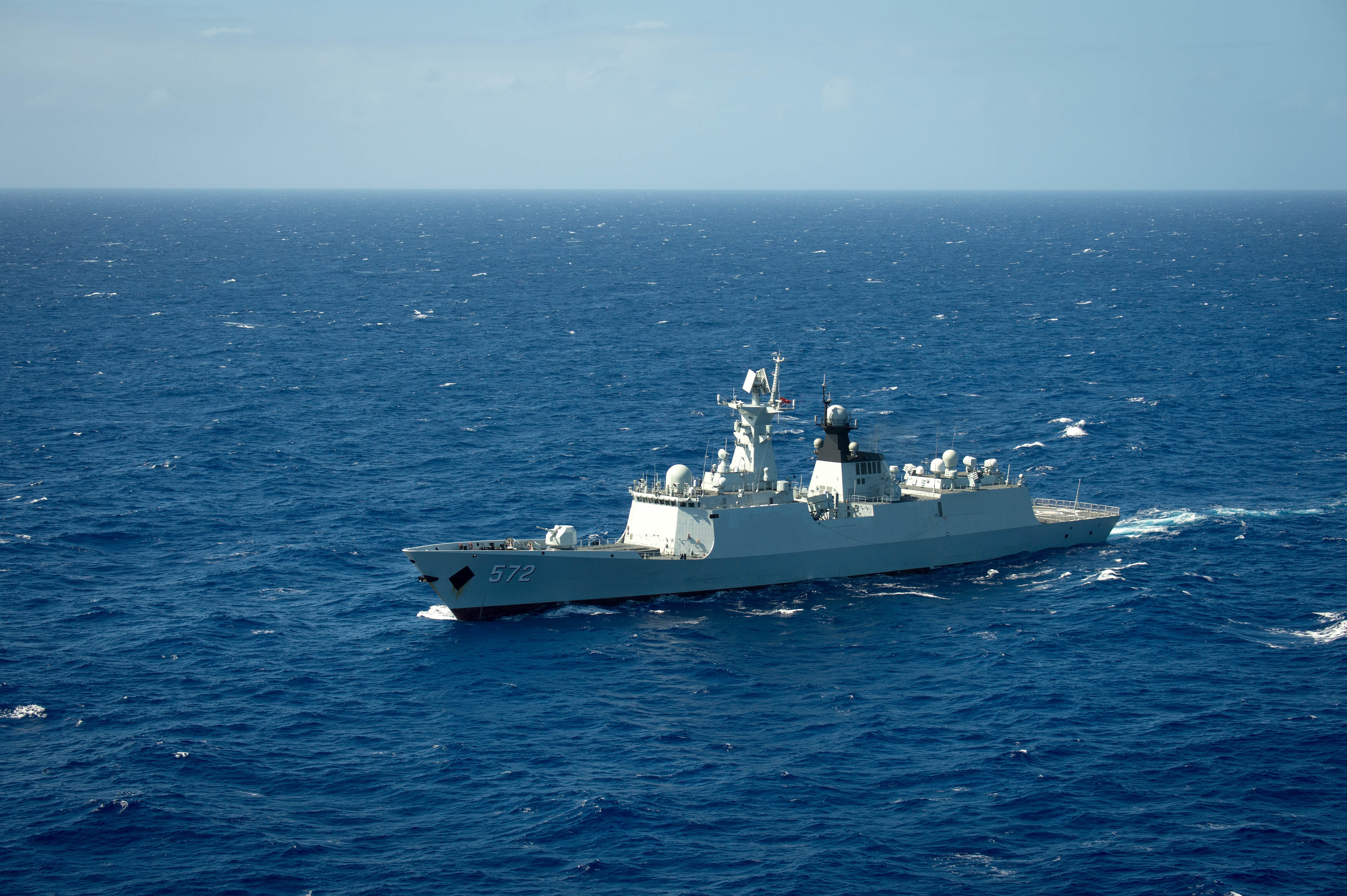

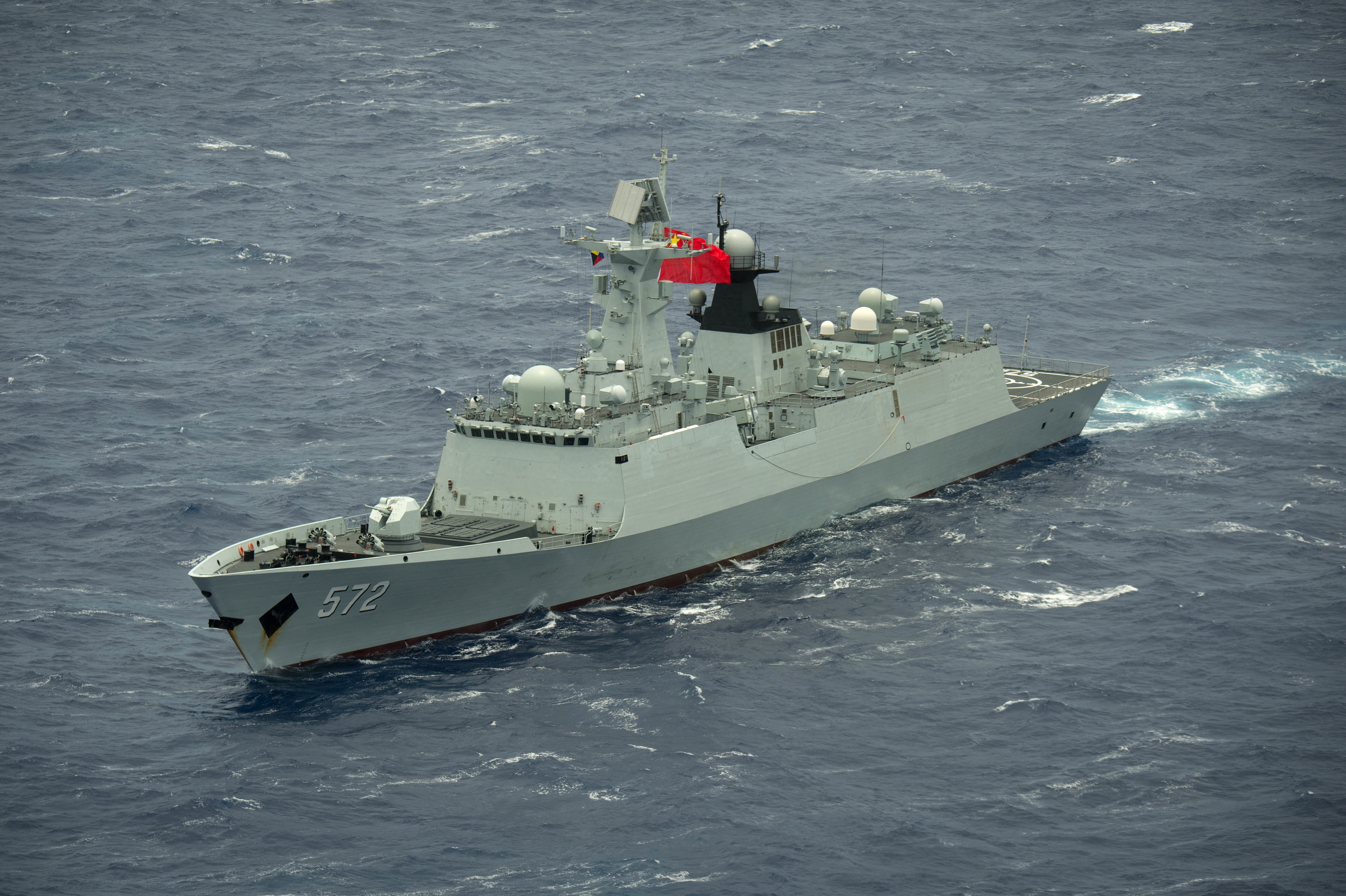

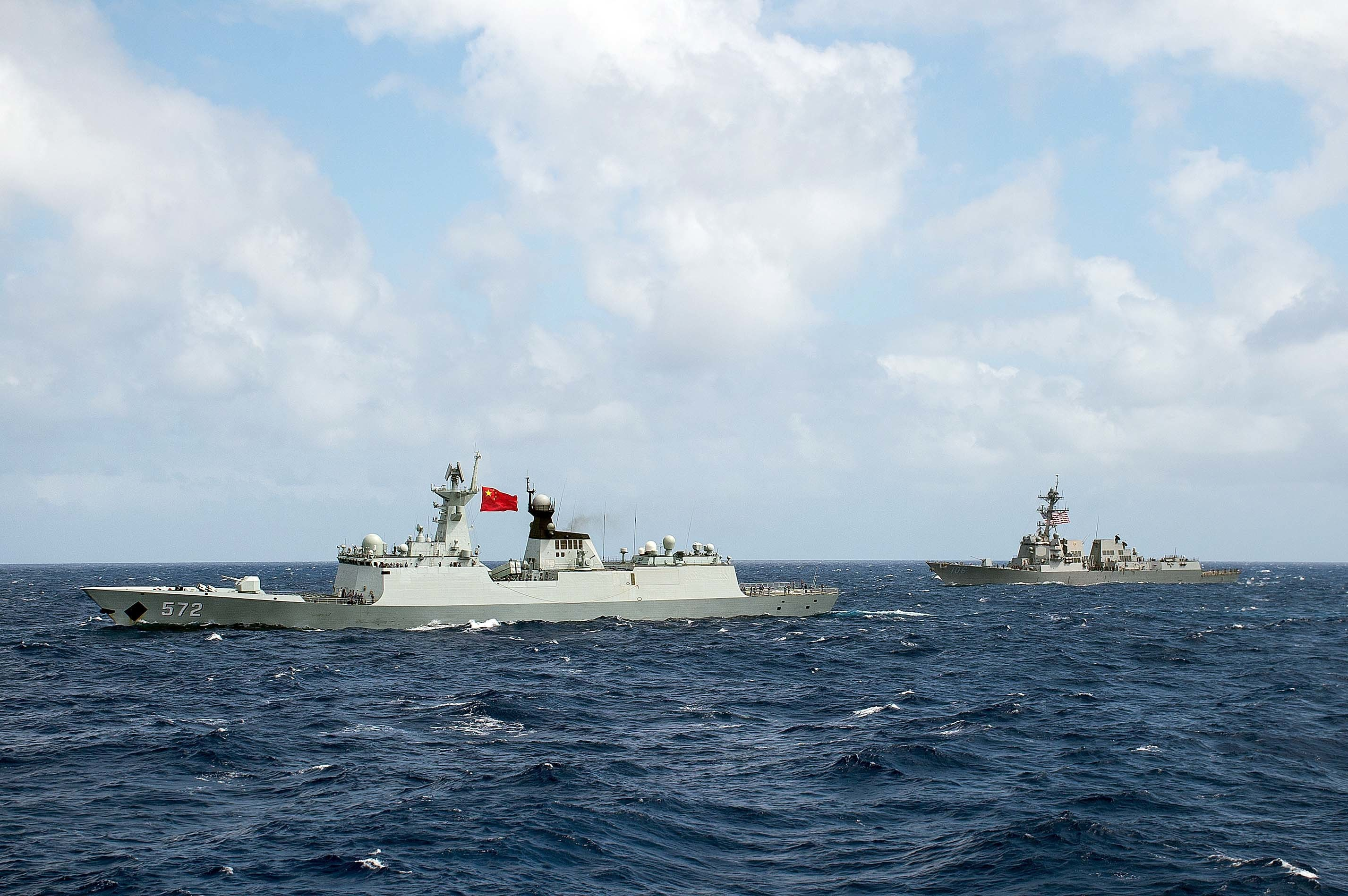

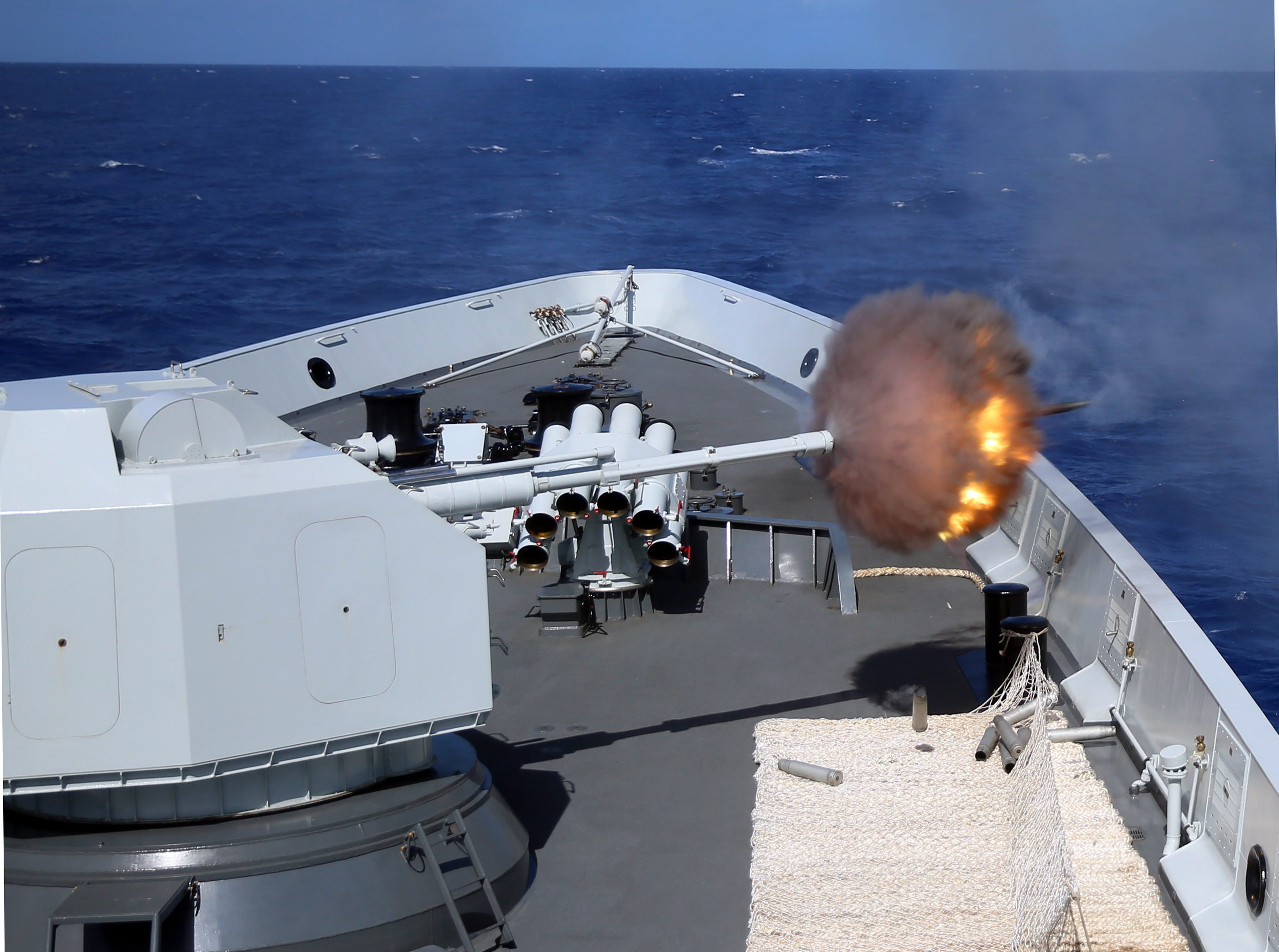

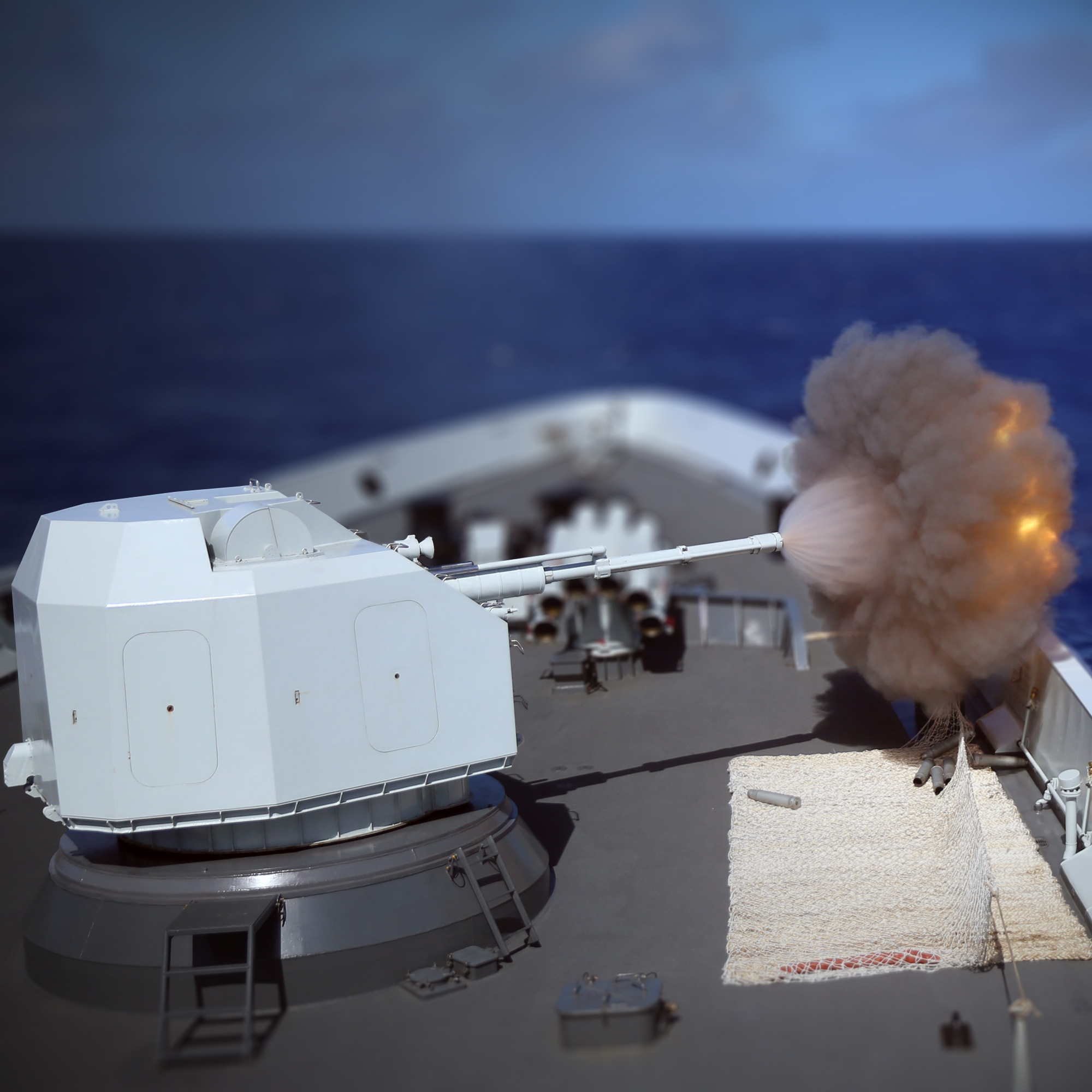

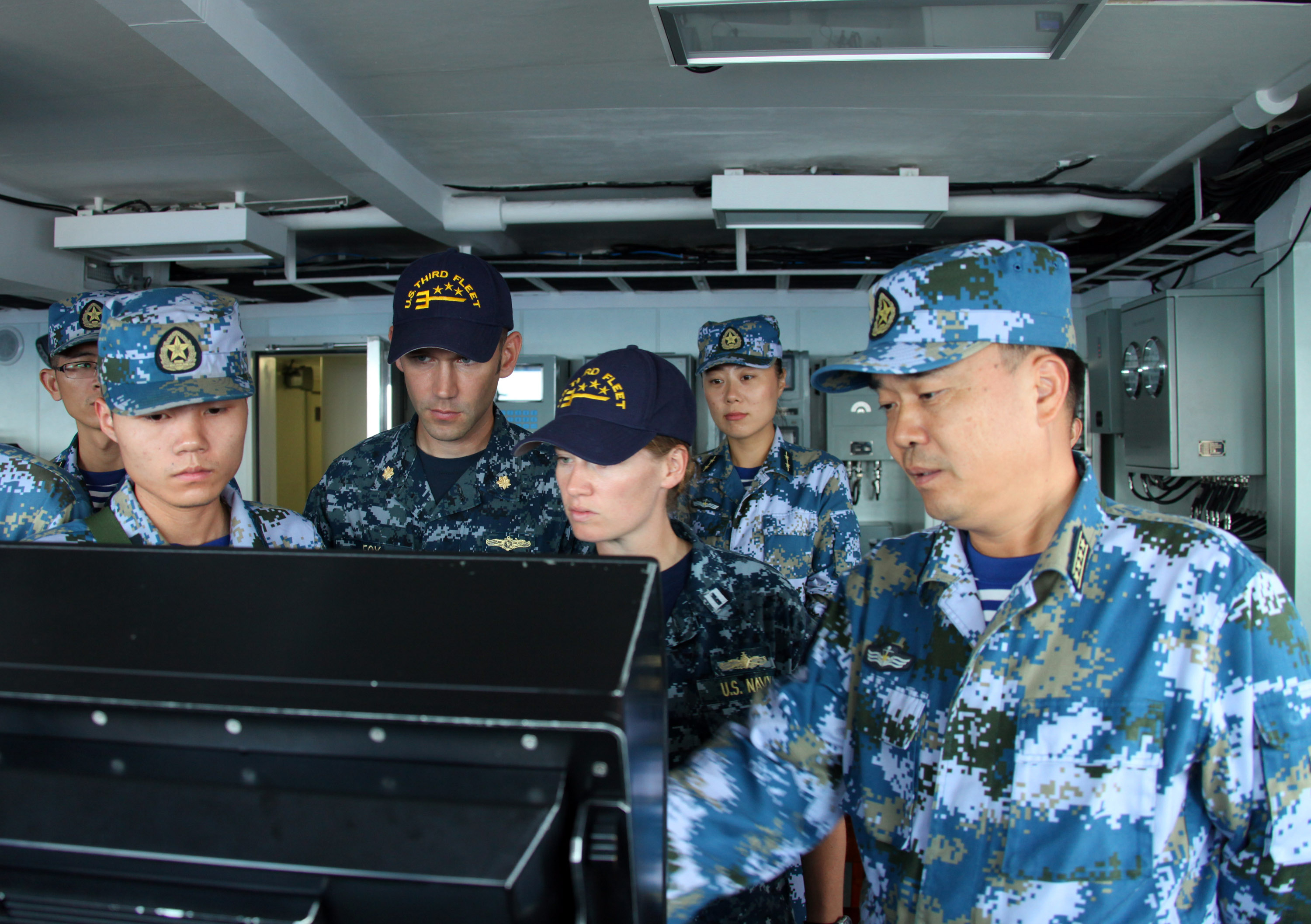

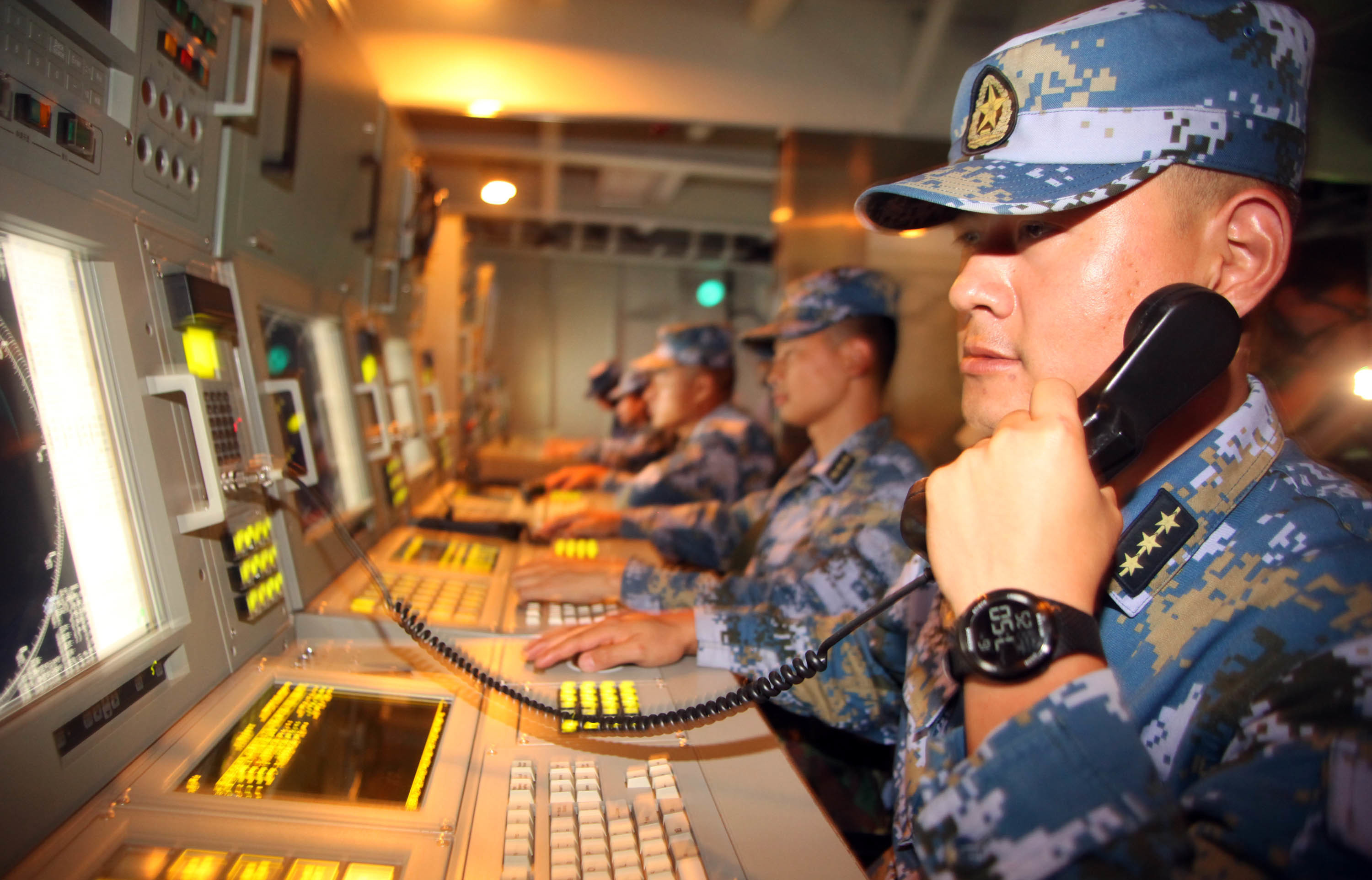

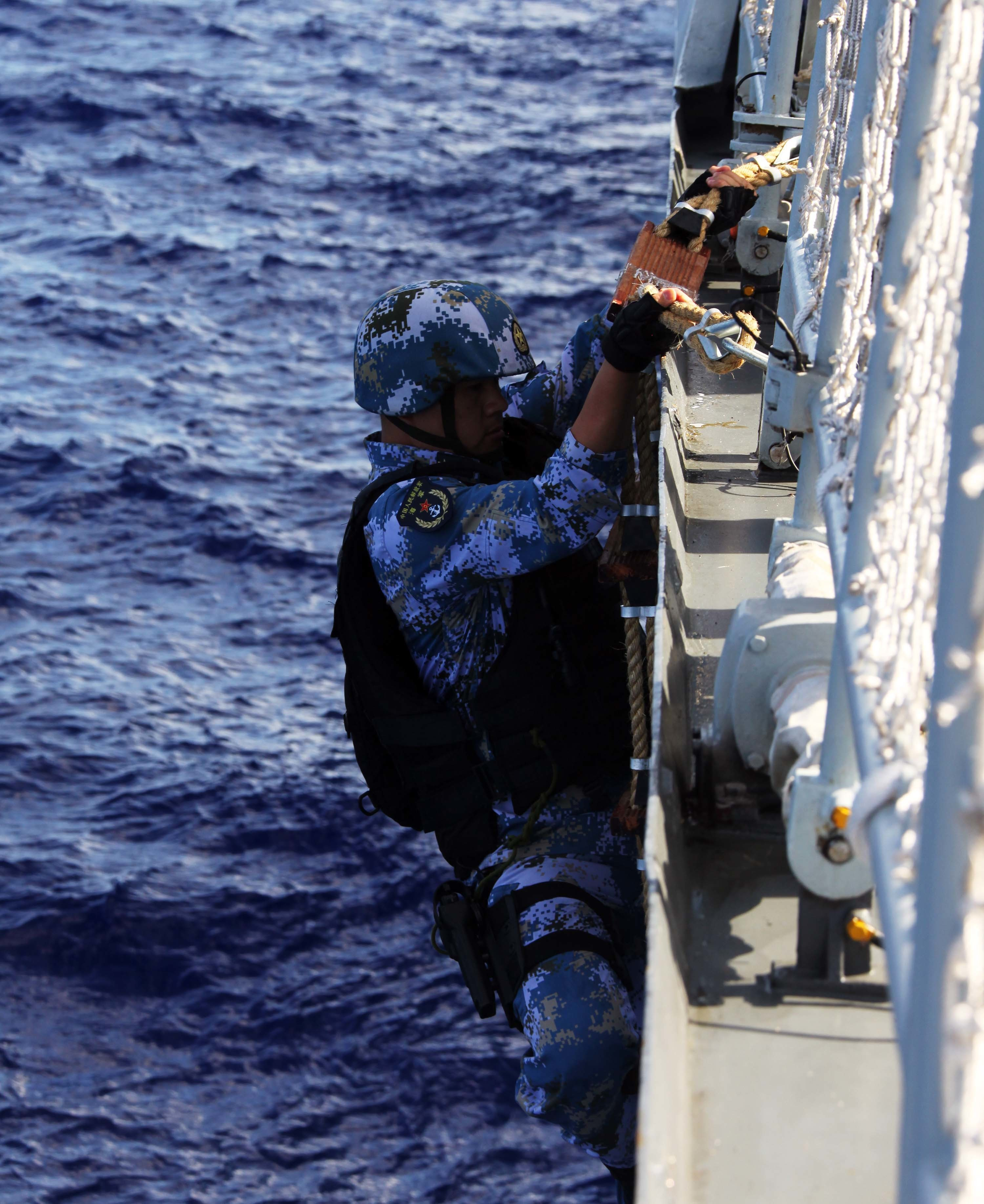

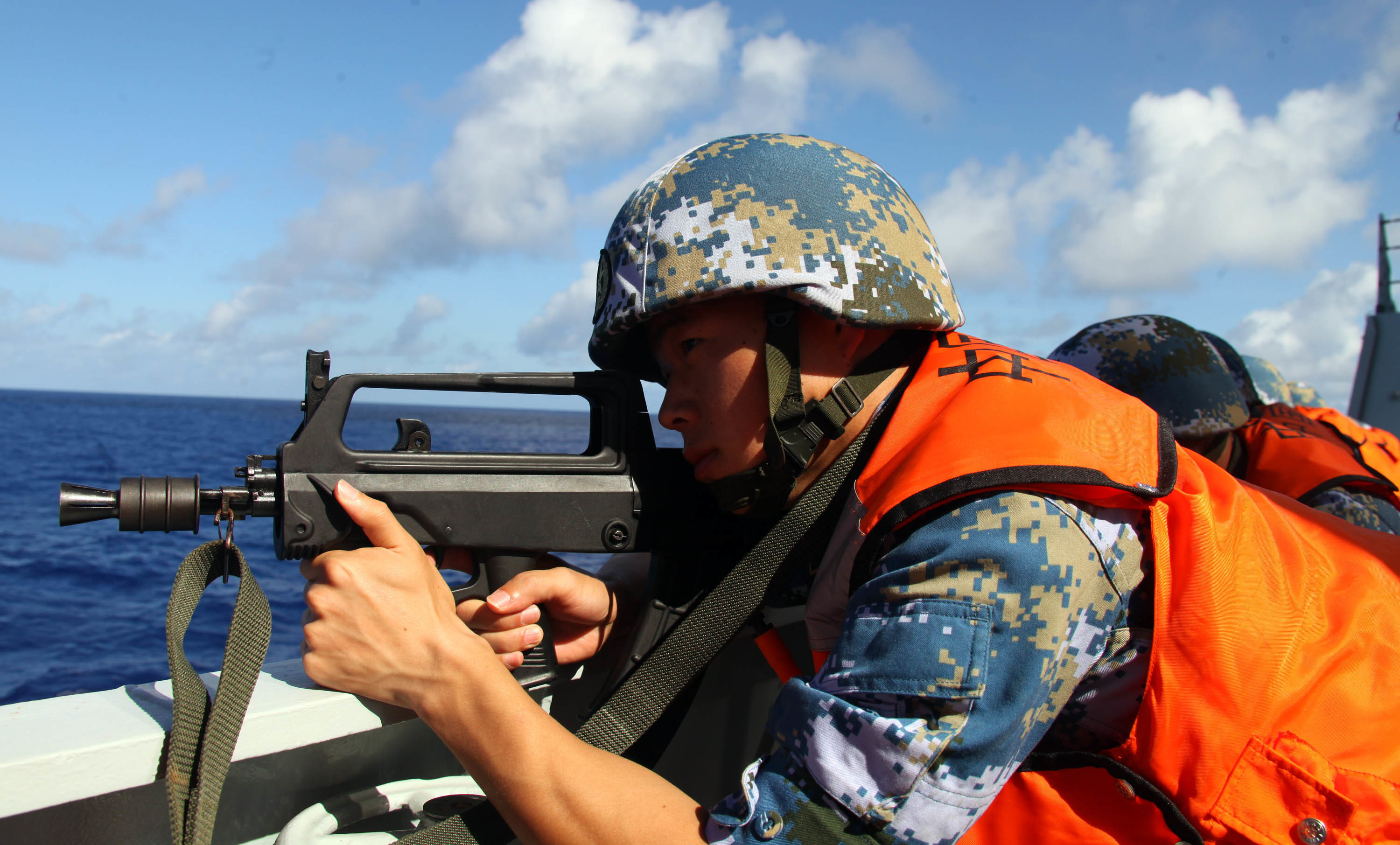

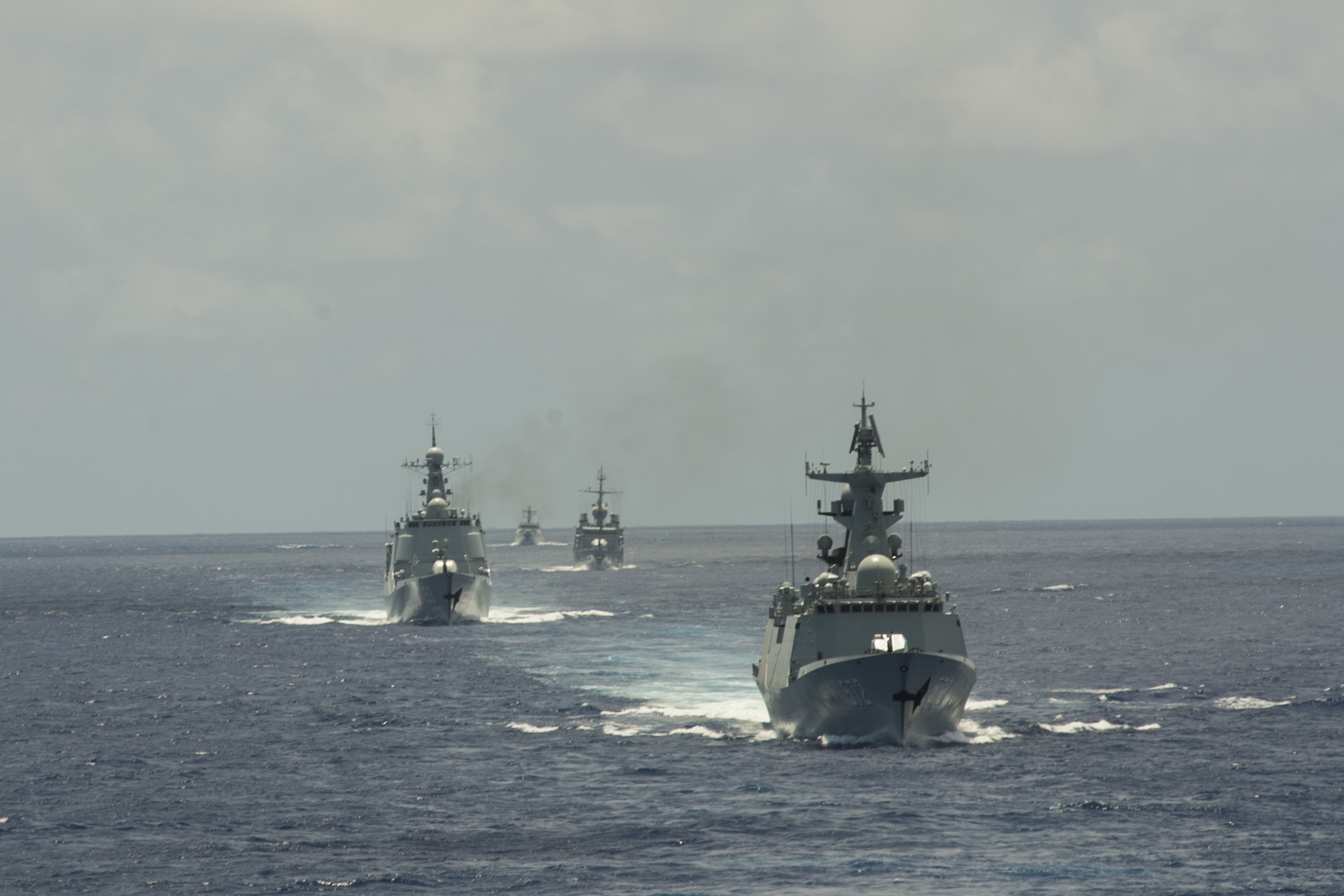
