= Chinese frigate Yueyang =

Type 054A frigate of the PLA Navy

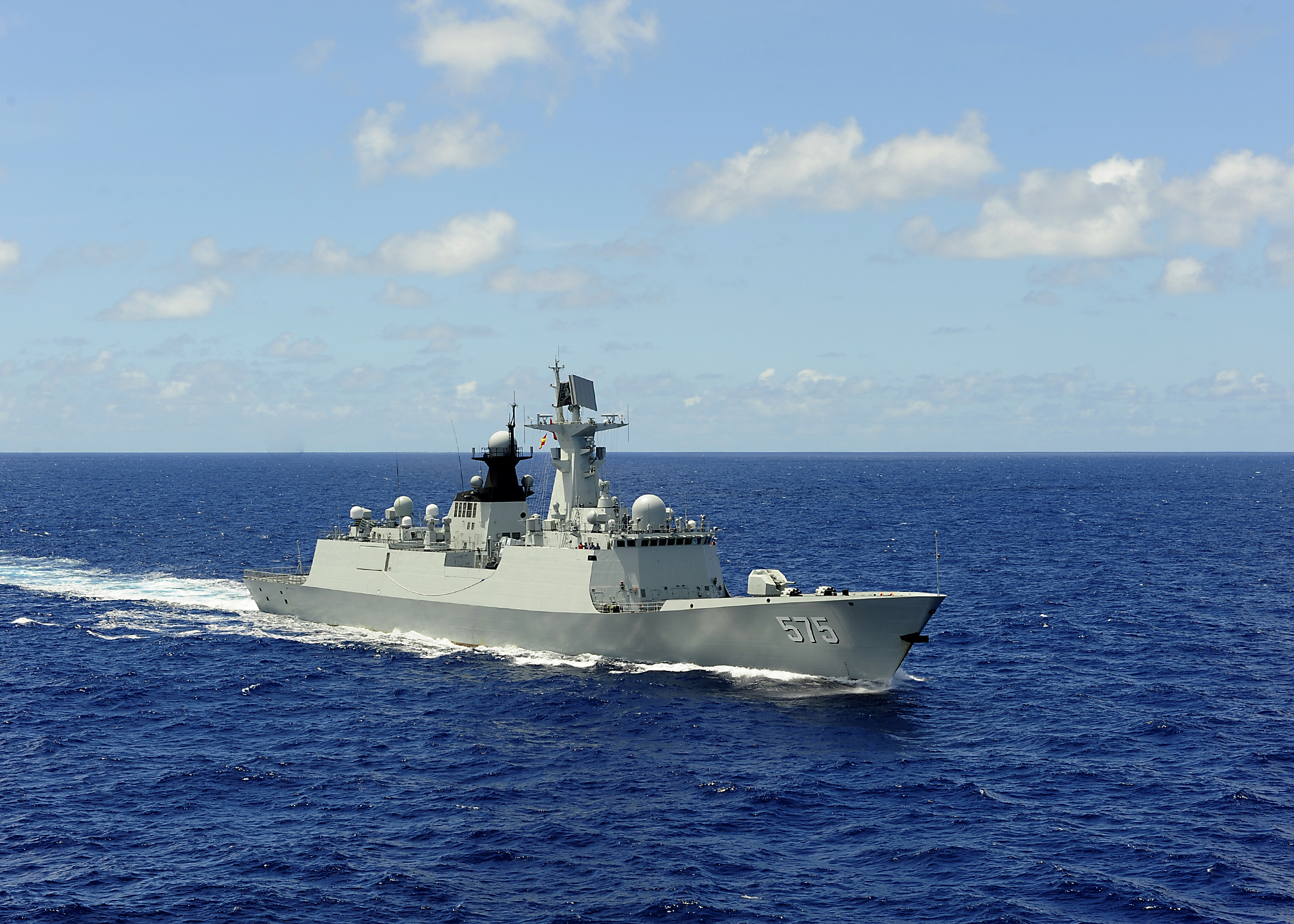
- Yueyang underway during RIMAPC 2014

History

China
- Name: Yueyang
- Namesake: Yueyang; (岳阳)
- Builder: Huangpu Shipyard, Shanghai
- Laid down: June 2010
- Launched: 10 May 2012
- Commissioned: 3 May 2013
- Identification: Pennant number: 575
- Status: Active

General characteristics
- Class & type: Type 054A frigate
- Displacement: 4,053 tonnes (full)
- Length: 134.1 m (440 ft)
- Beam: 16 m (52 ft)
- Propulsion: CODAD, 4 × Shaanxi 16 PA6 STC diesels, 5700 kW (7600+ hp @ 1084 rpm) each
- Speed: 27 knots estimated
- Range: 8,025 nautical miles (9,235 mi; 14,862 km) estimated
- Complement: 165
- Sensors & processing systems: Type 382 Radar; Type 344 Radar (Mineral-ME Band Stand) OTH target acquisition and SSM fire control radar; 4 × Type 345 Radar (MR-90 Front Dome) SAM fire control radars; MR-36A surface search radar, I-band; Type 347G 76 mm gun fire control radar; 2 × Racal RM-1290 navigation radars, I-band; MGK-335 medium frequency active/passive sonar system; H/SJG-206 towed array sonar; ZKJ-4B/6 (developed from Thomson-CSF TAVITAC) combat data system; HN-900 Data link (Chinese equivalent of Link 11A/B, to be upgraded); SNTI-240 SATCOM; AKD5000S Ku band SATCOM
- Electronic warfare & decoys: Type 922-1 radar warning receiver; HZ-100 ECM & ELINT system; Kashtan-3 missile jamming system
- Armament: 1 × 32-cell VLS; HQ-16 SAM; Yu-8 anti submarine rocket launcher; 2 × 4 C-803 anti-ship / land attack cruise missiles; 1 × PJ26 76 mm dual-purpose gun; 2 × Type 730 7-barrel 30 mm CIWS guns or Type 1130; 2 × 3 324mm Yu-7 ASW torpedo launchers; 2 × 6 Type 87 240mm anti-submarine rocket launcher (36 rockets carried); 2 × Type 726-4 18-tube decoy rocket launchers
- Aircraft carried: 1 Kamov Ka-28 'Helix' or Harbin Z-9C
- Aviation facilities: hangar

Yueyang (575) is a Type 054A frigate of the People's Liberation Army Navy. She was commissioned on 3 May 2013.

== Development and design ==
The Type 054A carries HQ-16 medium-range air defence missiles and anti-submarine missiles in a vertical launching system (VLS) system. The HQ-16 has a range of up to 50 km, with superior range and engagement angles to the Type 054's HQ-7. The Type 054A's VLS uses a hot launch method; a shared common exhaust system is sited between the two rows of rectangular launching tubes.

The four AK-630 close-in weapon systems (CIWS) of the Type 054 were replaced with two Type 730 CIWS on the Type 054A. The autonomous Type 730 provides improved reaction time against close-in threats.

== Construction and career ==
Yueyang was laid down in June 2010 and launched on 10 May 2012 at the Hudong-Zhonghua Shipyard in Shanghai. She was commissioned on 3 May 2013.

In mid-January 2014, the formation of Hengshui, Liuzhou, Yueyang and Sanya completed several offensive and defensive exercises in the training waters.

On June 9, 2014, Yueyang, Haikou and Qiandaohu participated in the RIMPAC 2014. The Chinese participating fleet set sail from the Sanya Military Port After crossing the Vietnam Sea and the Bashi Strait, sailing more than 2,100 nautical miles, arrived in the waters north of Guam on June 14. The ships of Singapore and Brunei joined together to form a multi-national task force to Hawaii. On June 24, a multi-national task force arrived at Pearl Harbor in Hawaii, the United States. During the period, Yueyang and others participated in a 38-day joint military exercise involving 22 navies and visited the United States. On September 3, after 87 days and nights, sailing 19,271 nautical miles, the Chinese navy fleet that participated in the RIMPAC 2014 and performed a visiting mission returned to a military port in Sanya.

On March 31, 2016, USS Chancellorsville was intercepted and monitored by the Yueyang near the waters of Huangyan Island in the South China Sea.

== Gallery ==
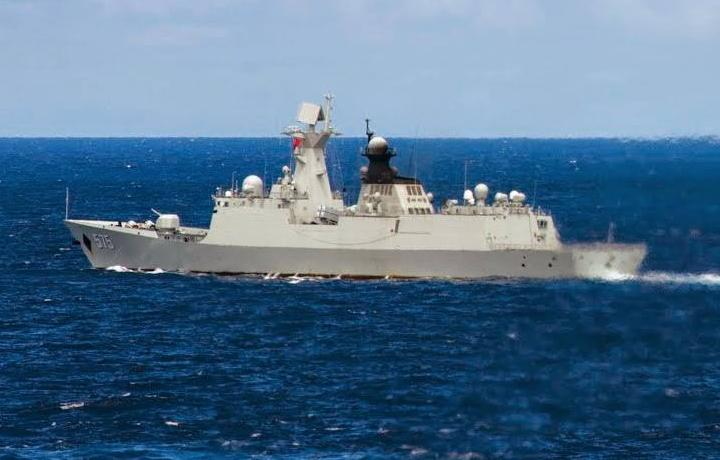
Yueyang during RIMPAC 2014.

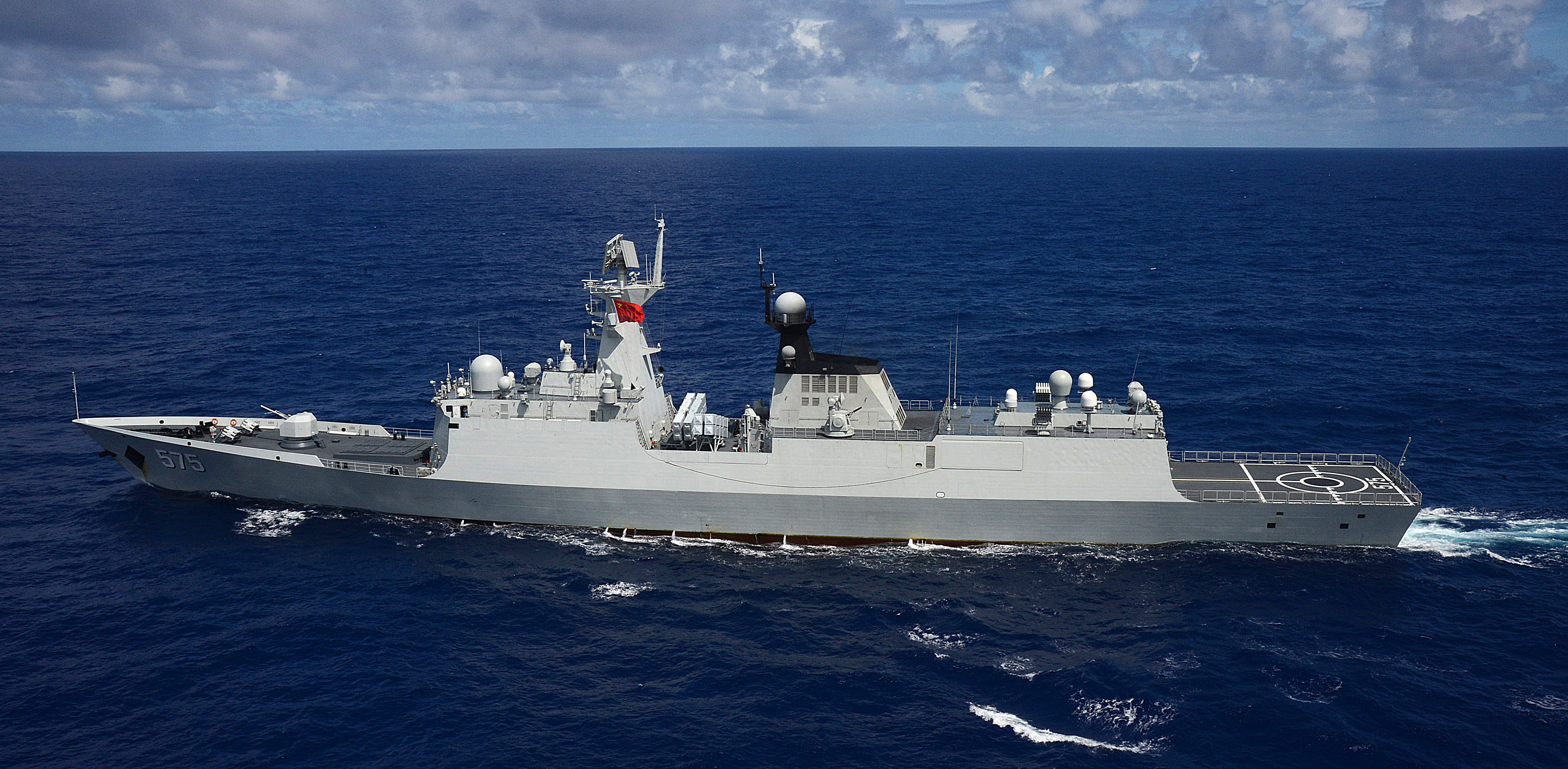

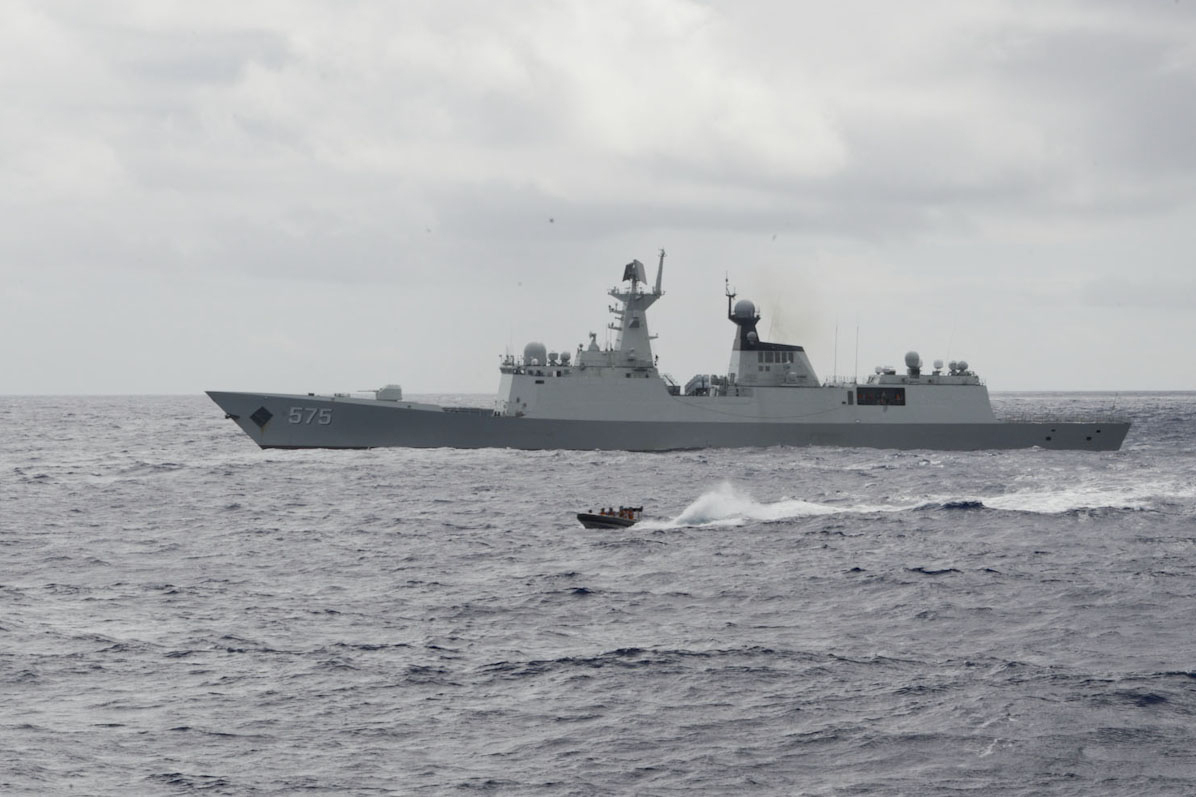

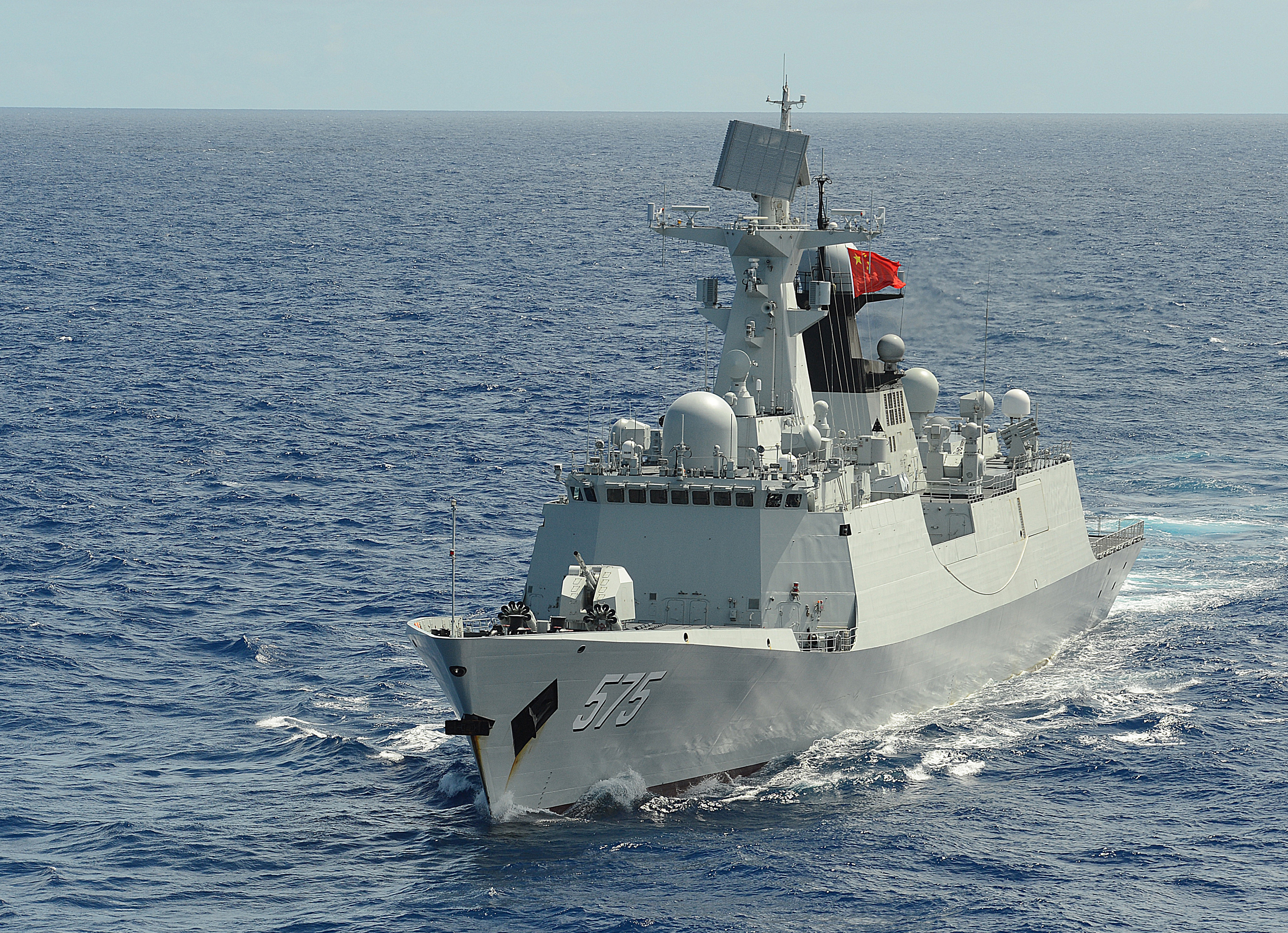

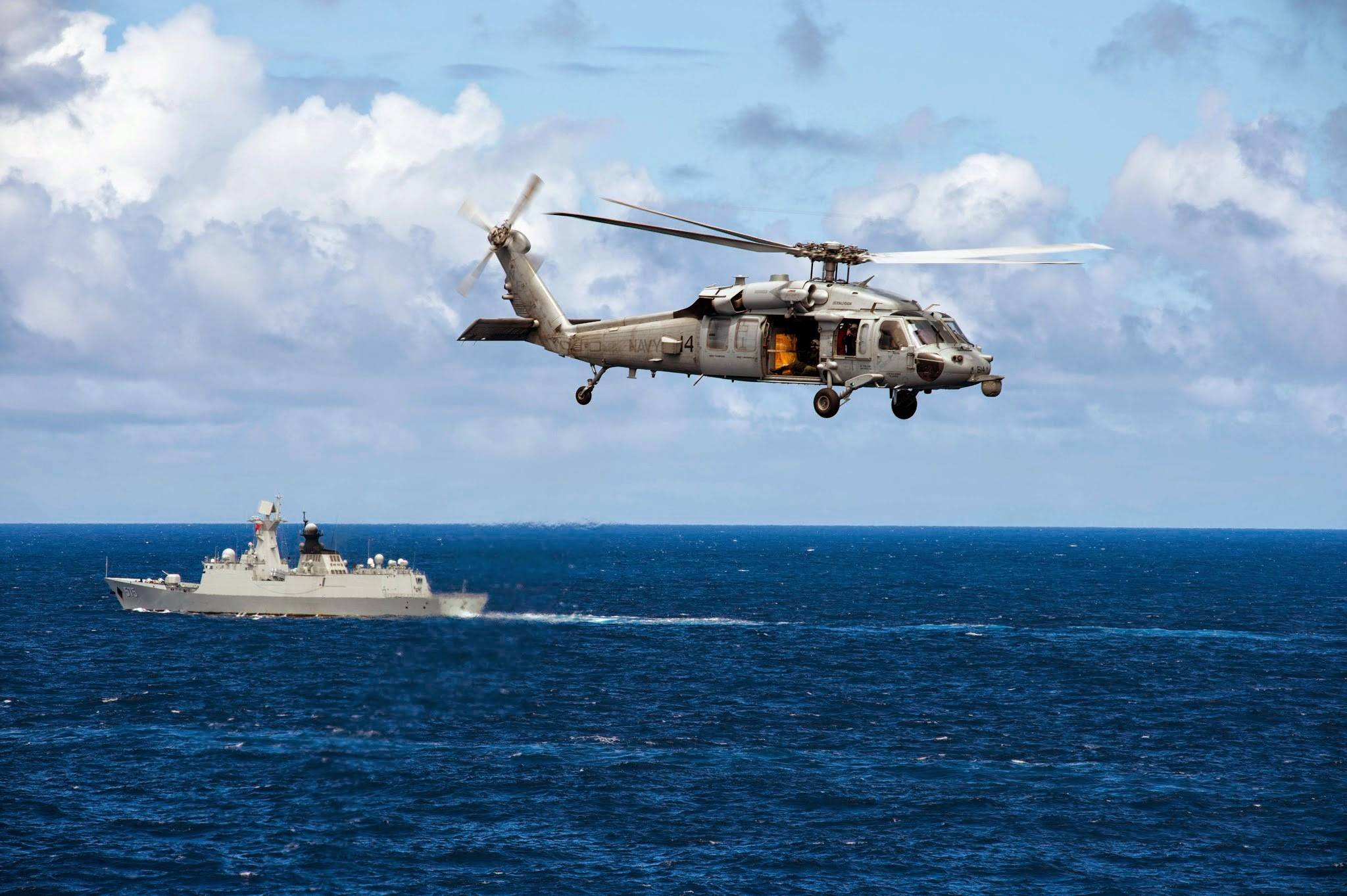

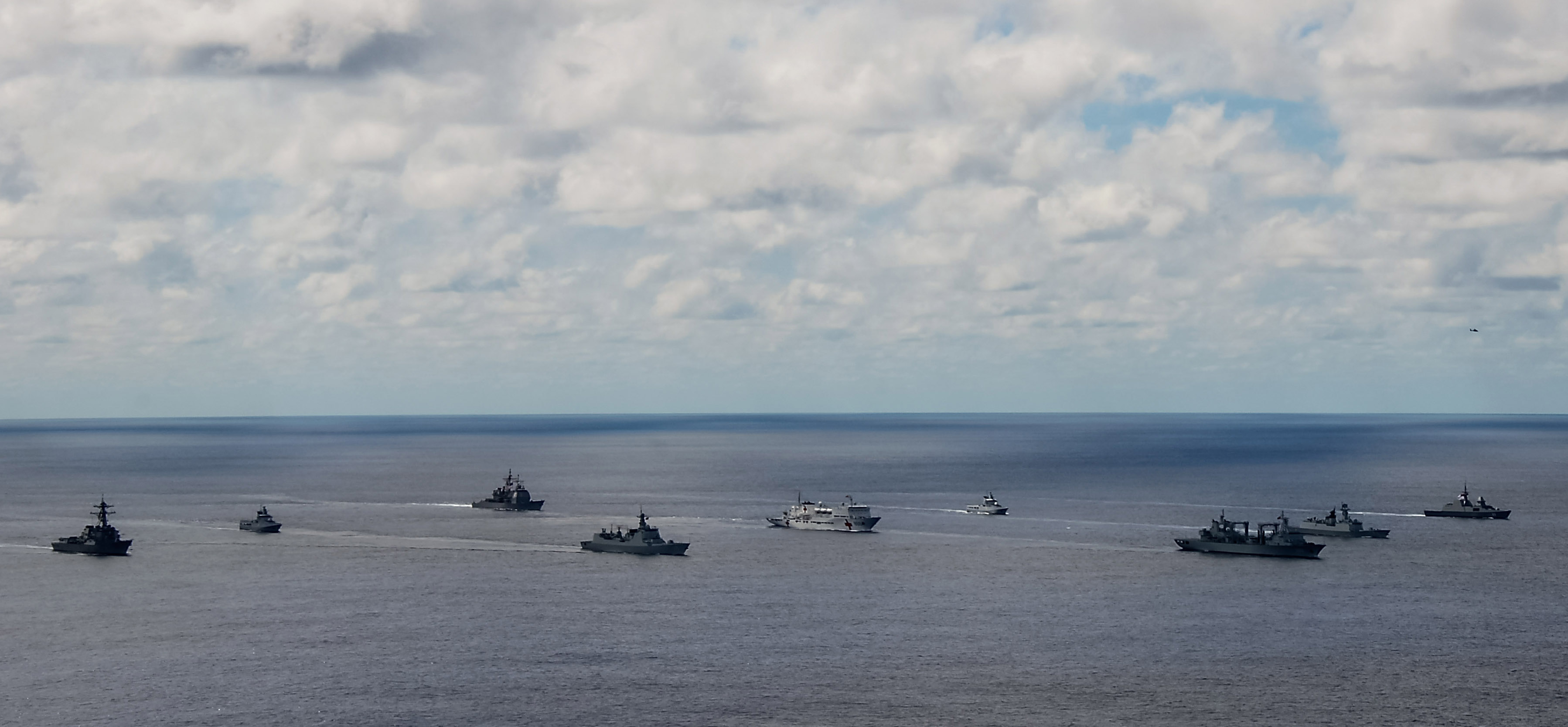

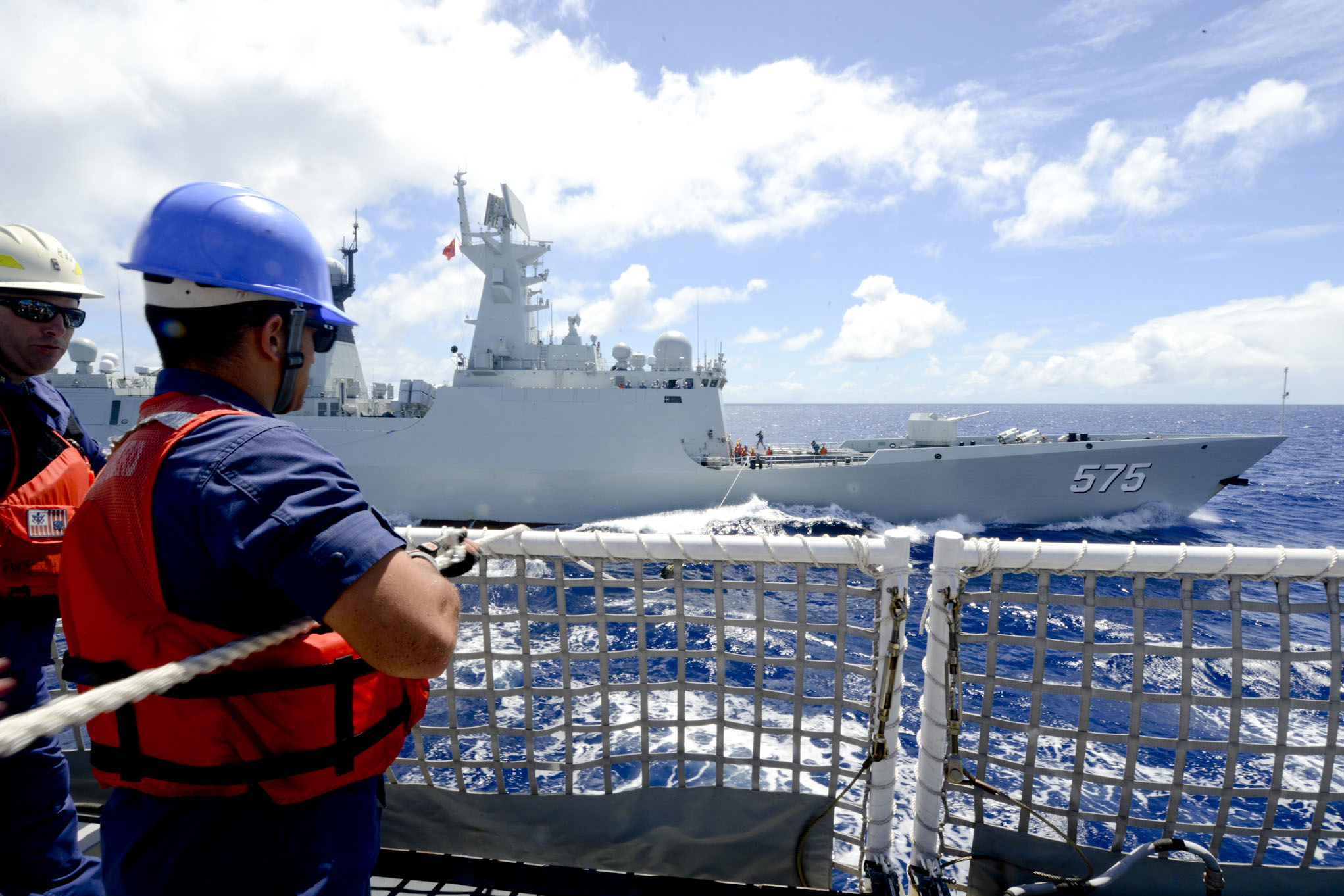

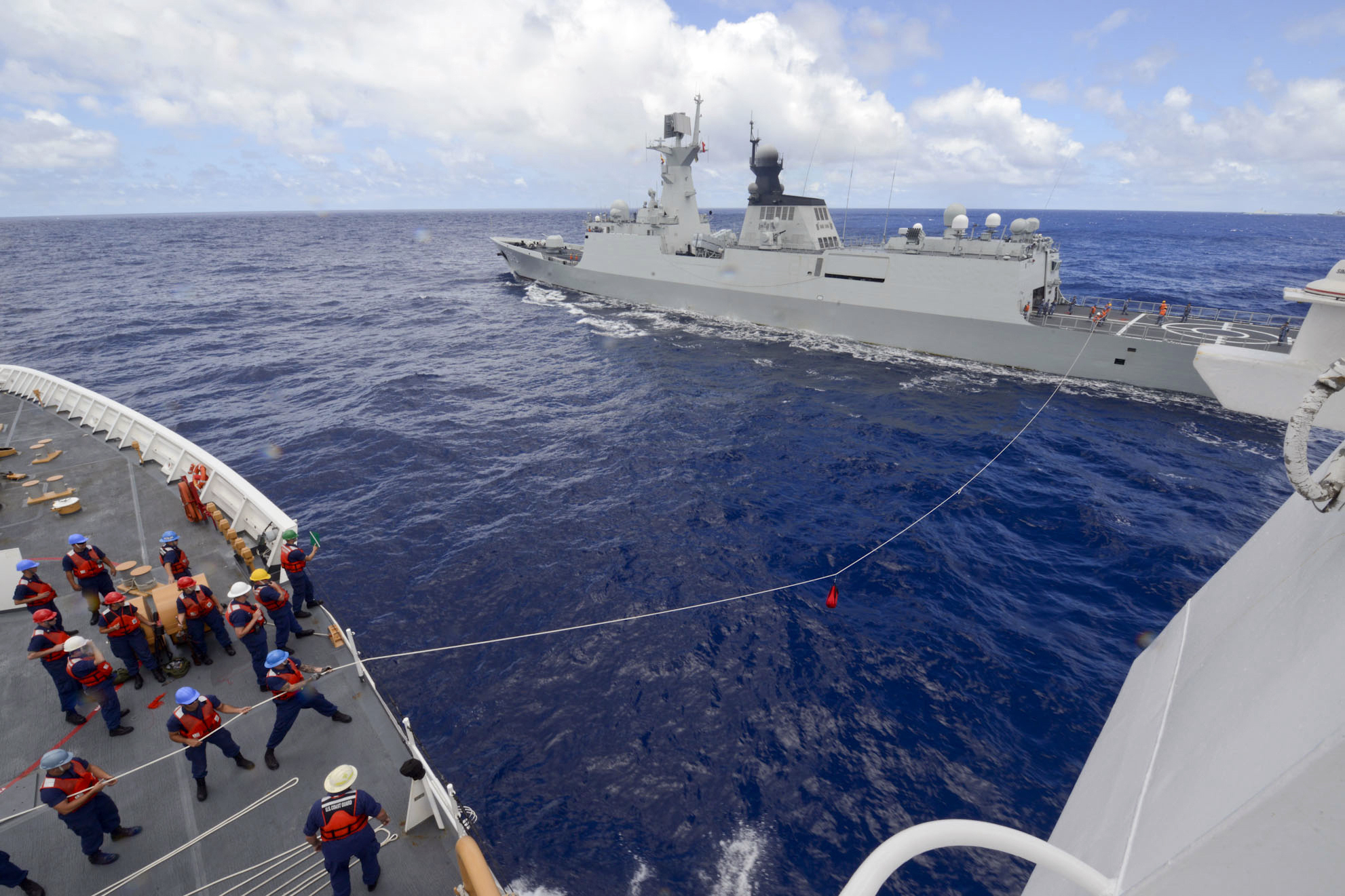
USCGC Waesche conducting a hand-line transfer to Yueyang during RIMPAC 2014

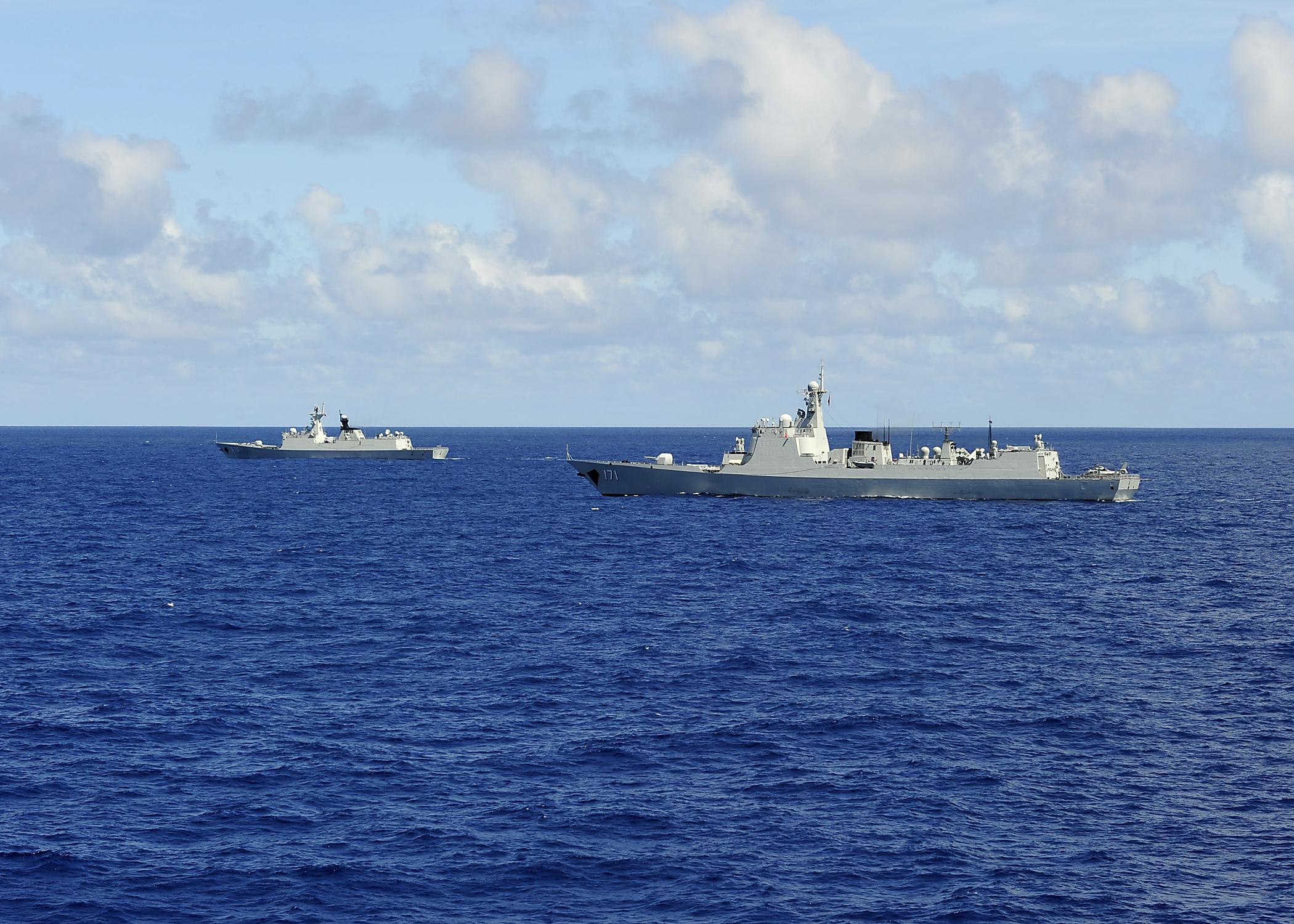
Yueyang alongside Haikou during RIMPAC 2014
