= Chinese frigate Sanya =

Type 054A frigate of the PLA Navy

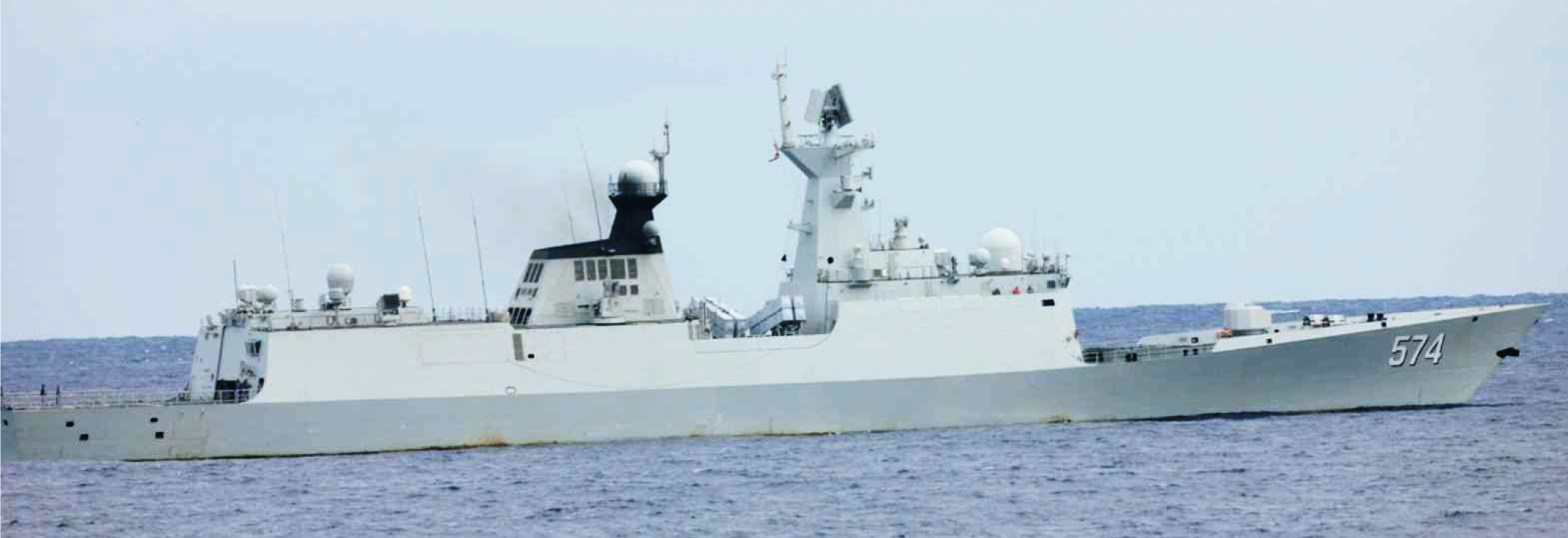
- Sanya underway on 25 May 2016

History

China
- Name: Sanya
- Namesake: Sanya; (三亚)
- Builder: Hudong-Zhonghua Shipbuilding, Shanghai
- Launched: 30 November 2012
- Commissioned: 13 December 2013
- Identification: Pennant number: 574
- Status: Active

General characteristics
- Class & type: Type 054A frigate
- Displacement: 4,053 tonnes (full)
- Length: 134.1 m (440 ft)
- Beam: 16 m (52 ft)
- Propulsion: CODAD, 4 × Shaanxi 16 PA6 STC diesels, 5700 kW (7600+ hp @ 1084 rpm) each
- Speed: 27 knots estimated
- Range: 8,025 nautical miles (9,235 mi; 14,862 km) estimated
- Complement: 165
- Sensors & processing systems: Type 382 Radar; Type 344 Radar (Mineral-ME Band Stand) OTH target acquisition and SSM fire control radar; 4 × Type 345 Radar (MR-90 Front Dome) SAM fire control radars; MR-36A surface search radar, I-band; Type 347G 76 mm gun fire control radar; 2 × Racal RM-1290 navigation radars, I-band; MGK-335 medium frequency active/passive sonar system; H/SJG-206 towed array sonar; ZKJ-4B/6 (developed from Thomson-CSF TAVITAC) combat data system; HN-900 Data link (Chinese equivalent of Link 11A/B, to be upgraded); SNTI-240 SATCOM; AKD5000S Ku band SATCOM
- Electronic warfare & decoys: Type 922-1 radar warning receiver; HZ-100 ECM & ELINT system; Kashtan-3 missile jamming system
- Armament: 1 × 32-cell VLS; HQ-16 SAM; Yu-8 anti submarine rocket launcher; 2 × 4 C-803 anti-ship / land attack cruise missiles; 1 × PJ26 76 mm dual-purpose gun; 2 × Type 730 7-barrel 30 mm CIWS guns or Type 1130; 2 × 3 324 mm Yu-7 ASW torpedo launchers; 2 × 6 Type 87 240 mm anti-submarine rocket launcher (36 rockets carried); 2 × Type 726-4 18-tube decoy rocket launchers
- Aircraft carried: 1 Kamov Ka-28 'Helix' or Harbin Z-9C
- Aviation facilities: hangar

Sanya (574) is a Type 054A frigate of the People's Liberation Army Navy. She was commissioned on 30 November 2012.

== Development and design ==
The Type 054A carries HQ-16 medium-range air defence missiles and anti-submarine missiles in a vertical launching system (VLS) system. The HQ-16 has a range of up to 50 km, with superior range and engagement angles to the Type 054's HQ-7. The Type 054A's VLS uses a hot launch method; a shared common exhaust system is sited between the two rows of rectangular launching tubes.

The four AK-630 close-in weapon systems (CIWS) of the Type 054 were replaced with two Type 730 CIWS on the Type 054A. The autonomous Type 730 provides improved reaction time against close-in threats.

== Construction and career ==
Sanya was launched on 30 November 2012 at the Hudong-Zhonghua Shipyard in Shanghai. She was commissioned on 13 December 2013.

In mid-January 2014, the formation of Hengshui, Liuzhou, Yueyang and Sanya completed several offensive and defensive exercises in the training waters.

In March 2015, Sanya and other South Sea Fleet 9th destroyer detachment formation went to sea for practical weapon training. After Sanya arrived in the exercise area, she conducted training on shooting from the main gun to the shore.

Sanya and Liuzhou participated in the India's International Fleet Review in 2016, in which during an exercise, she sailed alongside USS Antietam, INS Mysore and INS Ranvijay.

== Gallery ==
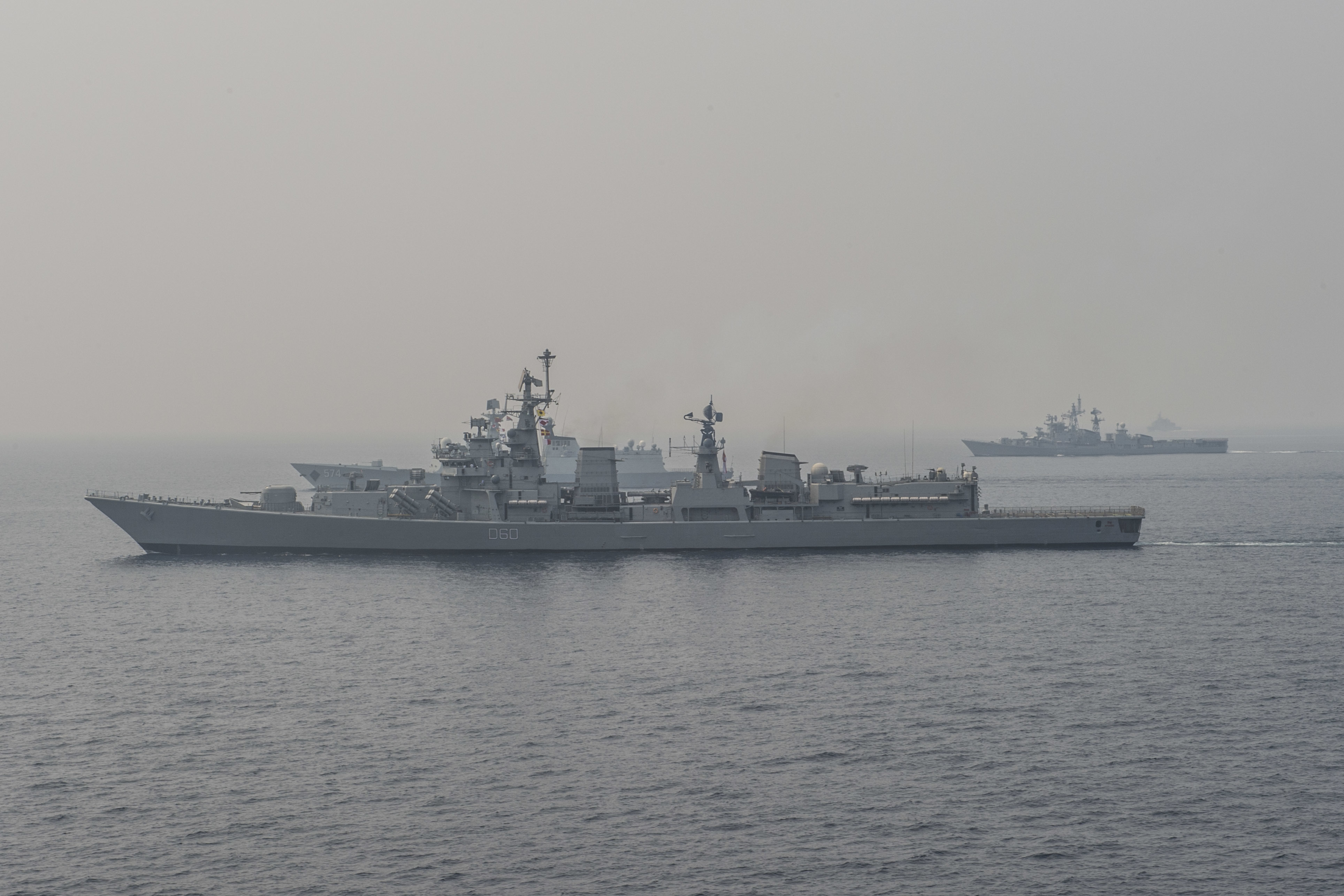
INS Mysore, Sanya and INS Ranvijay alongside USS Antietam on 8 February 2016
