= Chinese destroyer Kunming =

Type 052D destroyer of the PLA Navy

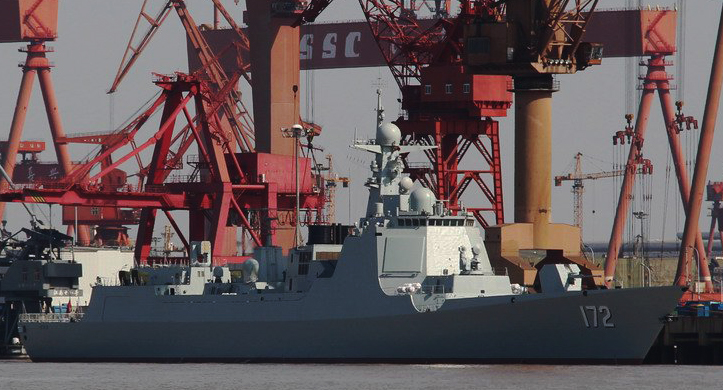
- Kunming docked at Jiangnan Shipyard on 6 April 2014

History

China
- Name: Kunming
- Namesake: Kunming; (昆明)
- Builder: Jiangnan Shipyard, Shanghai
- Laid down: 16 February 2012
- Launched: 29 August 2012
- Commissioned: 21 March 2014
- Identification: Pennant number: 172
- Status: Active

General characteristics
- Class & type: Type 052D destroyer
- Displacement: 7,500 tons (full load)
- Length: 157 m (515 ft 1 in)
- Beam: 17 m (55 ft 9 in)
- Draught: 6 m (19 ft 8 in)
- Propulsion: Combined diesel or gas
- Sensors & processing systems: Type 346 radar; Type 518 radar; Variable depth sonar; Towed array sonar
- Armament: 1 x 130 mm gun; 1 × HQ-10 short-range SAM 24-cell launcher; 64 cell VLS; HHQ-9 SAM; YJ-18 SSM; CY-5 ASW; Type 730 CIWS
- Aircraft carried: Helicopter
- Aviation facilities: Hangar; Helipad

Kunming (172) is a Type 052D destroyer of the People's Liberation Army Navy. She was commissioned on 21 March 2014.

== Development and design ==
The basic ship type and layout of the Type 052D guided-missile destroyer is the same as that of the Type 052C destroyer, but compared to the earlier Type 052C destroyer, the Type 052D superstructure has a larger inclination angle and provides better stealth performance. At the same time, the Type 052C helicopter hangar is located on the left side of the hull axis. This was changed to the center axis of the ship on the Type 052D; a pair of small boat storage compartments were added on both sides of the hangar, similar to the design on the Type 054A frigate.

The close-in weapon system is composed of a H/PJ-12 short-range defense weapon system located in front of the bridge and a 24 Hongqi-10 air defense missile system located on the top of the hangar, which is combined to form a ladder interception. The original 100-millimetre (3.9 in) naval gun was replaced by a higher height and better stealth model H/PJ45 naval gun. On 13 May 2019, the extended version of the Type 052DL was exposed. The hull of the Type 052DL is basically the same as the Type 052D, but the helicopter deck is lengthened to prepare for the Zhi-20 to board the ship.

The Type 052D is the first Chinese surface combatant to use canister-based universal vertical launch system (VLS), as opposed to the concentric type VLS carried aboard earlier vessels. 64 cells are carried; 32 forward and 32 aft. The VLS is reportedly an implementation of the GJB 5860-2006 standard. The VLS may fire the extended-range variant of the HHQ-9 surface-to-air missile, YJ-18 anti-ship cruise missiles, and CY-5 anti-submarine missiles.

== Construction and career ==
Kunming is the lead ship of the class and was laid down on 16 February 2012 at the Jiangnan Shipyard in Shanghai. She was launched on 29 August 2012 and commissioned on 21 March 2014.

On 26 October 2015, a United States Navy destroyer approached within 12 nautical miles (22 km; 14 mi) of Chinese islands and reefs in the South China Sea. Kunming was sent to surveil the American ship.

== See also ==
- ROCS Kunming
