= Chinese anti-piracy operations in the Gulf of Aden =

Since 2008, China has maintained a standing People's Liberation Army Navy (PLAN) task force in the Gulf of Aden as an anti-piracy measure in response to piracy off the coast of Somalia. The task force was initially authorized to escort only Chinese ships and ships carrying humanitarian supplies to Somalia; this was later expanded to accept commercial ships from other countries. Escorting Chinese ships in the Red Sea may have begun in January 2024 in response to the Red Sea crisis.

The task force is China's first sustained "far seas" military presence. It provides the PLAN with "invaluable" operational experience, the benefits of which are spread by rotating units from all fleets into the task force.

== Background ==
=== Impact of piracy ===
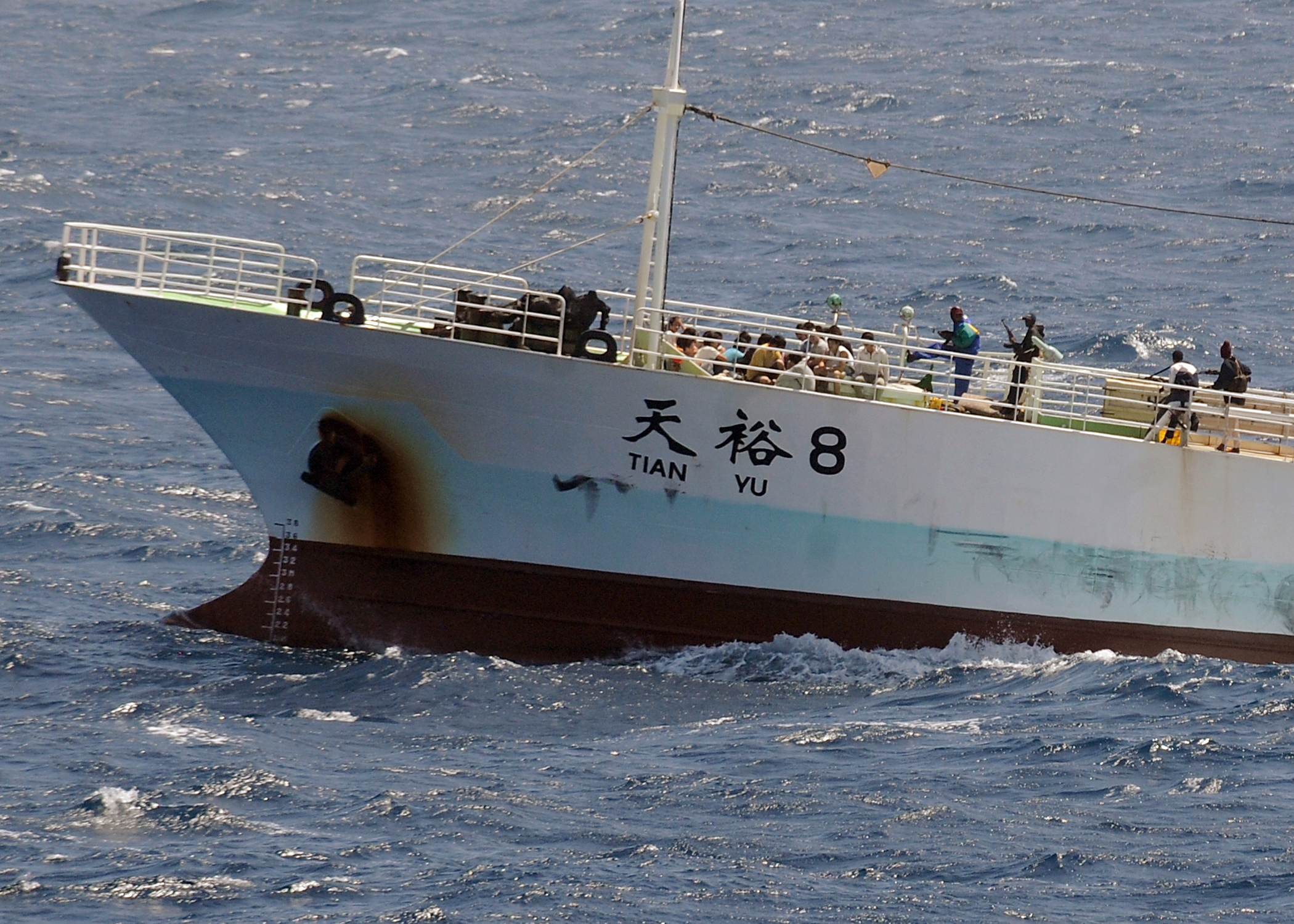
Chinese fishing boat Tianyu 8 hijacked by Somali pirates

In the 2000s, China developed greater interest and capability to protect its global interests.

Chinese discussions through 2012 identified the strategic importance of securing maritime trade routes. Shipping contributed to China's financial and energy security. 90% of China's international trade in goods was moved by ship. The country became a net importer of oil in 1993, and of natural gas in 2007. By 2012, 80% of imported oil arrived by sea. Reliable routes affected oil prices, which affected the stability of the United States dollar, and which in turn affected the value of Chinese investments in the United States and US capacity to buy Chinese products.

By 2009, views expressed by Chinese analysts included identifying piracy as a threat to national interests and that the state had a responsibility to protect Chinese shipping.

Global piracy increased every year from 2005 to 2010. China's response to piracy was uncoordinated and informal. The Ministry of Transport (MoT) responded to pirated ships through intermediaries, but this was "not very effective". Anti-pirate tactics for civilian ships recommended by MoT were also inadequate. By 2008, there was domestic support for comprehensive protective measures. By October, Chinese shipping companies, MoT, and the Ministry of Foreign Affairs (MoFA) supported deploying naval escorts. That year from January to November, 83 of 1,265 Chinese ships were attacked with several being pirated.

=== Legal considerations ===
Intervention would require exercising force inside the exclusive economic zone of another country beyond China's periphery. This novel scenario for Chinese foreign policy and law, combined with internal debate over the legality of intervention in terms of domestic and international law, delayed action. Three United Nations Security Council (UNSC) resolutions in 2008 authorizing intervention in Somali waters may have provided China with part of the legal foundation to intervene. Another part was securing an invitation from the Transitional Federal Government of Somalia (TFG) to avoid appearances of subverting sovereignty.

== Planning and preparation ==
International and domestic pressure led the PLAN, the MoT, and the MoFA to develop a policy framework for the mission with "unusual alacrity" in late-2008.

The PLA began feasibility studies in May 2008; a task force may have been seen as an opportunity to test the navy's newest equipment. The PLAN publicly announced its support in November, and the Central Military Commission (CMC) approved the navy's plan shortly afterward.

China "worked frantically" to secure an agreement from the Somali TFG. In a late-November interview with the Global Times, Mohammed Ahmed Awil, the TFG's ambassador to China, reported that the TFG had sent an invitation for Chinese warships and was awaiting a response. In mid-December, Awil and Ali Jangali, the Somali Minister of Foreign Affairs reiterated the TFG's support for a Chinese naval task force.

On 20 December 2008, China announced it would deploy a naval task force. This followed the adoption of United Nations Security Council Resolution 1851, which extended the area of operations of UN authorized anti-piracy operations to include the Somali coast.

== International cooperation ==
In late-November 2024, Wolfgang E. Nolting, the commander of the German Navy, met Liang Guanglie, China's Minister of National Defense, in Beijing and discussed military aspects of China–Germany relations. Nolting hoped improved cooperation would extend to anti-piracy efforts.

China's escort mission is organizationally independent from other coalition forces. In 2008, China may have perceived international piracy law as being too immature to provide a framework. Furthermore, the existing coalition forces—the United States' Combined Maritime Forces, NATO's Operation Ocean Shield, and the European Union's Operation Atalanta—were not UN-led, and close integration may have allowed partners to gather intelligence on Chinese capabilities. Integration may also have required installation of foreign software or hardware which may not have been possible or desirable for security reasons.

China participates in Shared Awareness and Deconfliction (SHADE) which provides a high-level discussion forum for coordinating counter-piracy forces. SHADE does not exercise control over participating forces.

== Organization and mission scope ==
The mission is jointly managed by the PLAN, the MoT, and the MoFA. The MoT participates in coordinating Chinese anti-piracy efforts with other countries and media relations.

The naval forces are controlled by PLAN headquarters instead of the Joint Staff Department, which nominally has control over operations beyond China's periphery. A task force is deployed by a PLAN fleet and typically include two warships, a supply ship, and approximately 800 personnel. The formations deploy for four to six months. It takes about two weeks to sail from China to Somalia.

Rules of engagement are restrictive to avoid capturing pirates and the need to prosecute them. Suspected pirates are advised to disengage through visual, verbal, and live-fire warnings before escalating the engagement; the main tactic is to deter, drive away, or disarm attacks. China's justice system lacks mechanisms to prosecute piracy, and it is also reluctant to try criminals captured in foreign countries in domestic courts. China is also sensitive to the lack of an internationally agreed upon process for dealing with captured pirates.

Nearby ports used for replenishment include Aden, Djibouti City, and Salalah. Djibouti was used as a forward repair base in August 2009; China's first overseas military base opened in Djibouti in August 2017.

The initial mission was the protection of UN World Food Programme aid to Somilia and Chinese shipping. This was expanded to foreign ships; foreign requests are handled through the MoT. In 2024, escorts may have started for Chinese ships in the Red Sea.

== Events ==
The first task force deployed from Sanya on 26 December 2008.

In March 2011, the frigate Xuzhou from the seventh task force escorted a civilian ship transporting Chinese evacuated from the Libyan civil war. This was the PLAN's first noncombatant evacuation operation overseas.

By the end of 2012, the task forces had escorted over 5,000 ships.

== Task forces ==
=== 2008–2020 ===
Escort Task Group	Ships	Crew (Note: Sailors, including Navy and Marine or special forces personnel)	Departure	Start	End	Return	Ref
1st Escort Task Group (Task Group 169)	DDG-169 Wuhan (Type 052B destroyer); DDG-171 Haikou (Type 052C destroyer); AOR-887 Weishan Hu (Type 903 replenishment ship)	869	26-12-2008	26-1-2009	15-4-2009	28-4-2009	
2nd Escort Task Group (Task Group 167)	DDG-167 Shenzhen (Type 051B destroyer); FFG-570 Huangshan (Type 054A frigate); AOR-887 Weishan Hu (Type 903 replenishment ship)	866	2-4-2009	15-4-2009	1-8-2009	21-8-2009	
3rd Escort Task Group (Task Group 529)	FFG-529 Zhoushan (Type 054A frigate); FFG-530 Xuzhou (Type 054A frigate); AOR-886 Qiandao Hu (Type 903 replenishment ship)	806	16-7-2009	1-8-2009	29-11-2009	20-12-2009	
4th Escort Task Group (Task Group 525)	FFG-525 Ma'anshan (Type 054 frigate); FFG-526 Wenzhou (Type 054 frigate); FFG-568 Chaohu (Type 054A frigate); AOG-886 Qiandao Hu (Type 903 replenishment ship)	788	30-10-2009	27-11-2009	18-3-2010	23-4-2010	
5th Escort Task Group (Task Group 168)	DDG-168 Guangzhou (Type 052B destroyer); FFG-568 Chaohu (Type 054A frigate); AOR-887 Weishan Hu (Type 903 replenishment ship)	825	4-3-2010 (Note: FFG-568 Chaohu departed on 2-12-2009)	18-3-2010 (Note: FFG-568 Chaohu started on 21-12-2009)	20-7-2010	12-9-2010	
6th Escort Task Group (Task Group 998)	LPD-998 Kunlun Shan (Type 071 amphibious transport dock); DDG-171 Lanzhou (Type 052C destroyer); AOR-887 Weishan Hu (Type 903 replenishment ship)	981	30-6-2010	14-7-2010	20-11-2010	7-1-2011	
7th Escort Task Group (Task Group 530)	FFG-529 Zhoushan (Type 054A frigate); FFG-530 Xuzhou (Type 054A frigate); AOR-886 Qiandao Hu (Type 903 replenishment ship)	788	2-11-2010	23-11-2010	11-11-2011	9-5-2011	
8th Escort Task Group (Task Group 526)	FFG-525 Ma'anshan (Type 054 frigate); FFG-526 Wenzhou (Type 054 frigate); AOR-886 Qiandao Hu (Type 903 replenishment ship)	796	21-2-2011	18-3-2011	21-7-2011	28-8-2011	
9th Escort Task Group (Task Group 169)	DDG-169 Wuhan (Type 052B destroyer); FFG-569 Yulin (Type 054A frigate); AOR-885 Qinghai Hu (Type 908 replenishment ship)	878	2-7-2011	23-7-2011	15-11-2011	24-12-2011	
10th Escort Task Group (Task Group 171)	DDG-171 Haikou (Type 052C destroyer); FFG-571 Yuncheng (Type 054A frigate); AOR-885 Qinghai Hu (Type 908 replenishment ship)	875	2-11-2011	19-11-2011	17-3-2012	5-5-2012	
11th Escort Task Group (Task Group 113)	DDG-113 Qingdao (Type 052 destroyer); FFG-538 Yantai (Type 054A frigate); AOR-887 Weishan Hu (Type 903 replenishment ship)	779	27-2-2012	17-3-2012	18-7-2012	12-9-2012	
12th Escort Task Group (Task Group 548)	FFG-548 Yiyang (Type 054A frigate); FFG-549 Changzhou (Type 054A frigate); AOR-886 Qiandao Hu (Type 903 replenishment ship)	788	3-7-2012	18-7-2012	23-11-2012	19-1-2013	
13th Escort Task Group (Task Group 570)	FFG-568 Hengyang (Ex-Chaohu, Type 054A frigate); FFG-570 Huangshan (Type 054A frigate); AOR-885 Qinghai Hu (Type 908 replenishment ship)	787	9-11-2012	23-11-2012	13-3-2013	23-5-2013	
14th Escort Task Group (Task Group 112)	DDG-112 Harbin (Type 052 destroyer); FFG-528 Mianyang (Type 053H3 frigate); AOR-887 Weishan Hu (Type 903 replenishment ship)	736	16-2-2013	13-3-2013	22-8-2013 (Note: FFG-528 Mianyang ended on 25-8-2013)	28-9-2013	
15th Escort Task Group (Task Group 999)	LPD-999 Jinggang Shan (Type 071 amphibious transport dock); FFG-572 Hengshui (Type 054A frigate); AOR-889 Tai Hu (Type 903 replenishment ship)	853	8-8-2013	22-8-2013	20-12-2013	22-1-2014	
16th Escort Task Group (Task Group 546)	FFG-527 Luoyang (Type 053H3 frigate); FFG-546 Yancheng (Type 054A frigate); AOR-889 Tai Hu (Type 903 replenishment ship)	660	11-11-2013	20-12-2013	18-4-2014	18-7-2014	
17th Escort Task Group (Task Group 150)	DDG-150 Changchun (Type 052C destroyer); FFG-549 Changzhou (Type 054A frigate); AOR-890 Chao Hu (Type 903 replenishment ship)	810	25-3-2014	18-4-2014	23-8-2014	22-10-2014	
18th Escort Task Group (Task Group 989)	LPD-989 Changbai Shan (Type 071 amphibious transport dock); FFG-571 Yuncheng (Type 054A frigate); AOR-890 Chao Hu (Type 903 replenishment ship)	1200	2-8-2014	23-8-2014	24-12-2014	19-3-2015	
19th Escort Task Group (Task Group 547)	FFG-547 Linyi (Type 054A frigate); FFG-550 Weifang (Type 054A frigate); AOR-887 Weishan Hu (Type 903 replenishment ship)	780	2-12-2014	24-12-2014	24-4-2015	10-7-2015	
20th Escort Task Group (Task Group 152)	DDG-152 Jinan (Type 052C destroyer); FFG-528 Yiyang (Type 054A frigate); AOR-886 Qiandao Hu (Type 903 replenishment ship)	~800	3-4-2015	24-4-2015	22-8-2015	5-2-2016	
21st Escort Task Group (Task Group 573)	FFG-573 Liuzhou (Type 054A frigate); FFG-574 Sanya (Type 054A frigate); AOR-885 Qinghai Hu (Type 908 replenishment ship)	~700	4-8-2015	22-8-2015	3-1-2016	8-3-2016	
22nd Escort Task Group (Task Group 576)	FFG-576 Daqing (Type 054A frigate); DDG-112 Harbin (Type 052 destroyer); AOR-889 Tai Hu (Type 903 replenishment ship)	~700	6-12-2015	3-1-2016	29-4-2016	30-6-2016	
23rd Escort Task Group (Task Group 531)	FFG-531 Xiangtan (Type 054A frigate); FFG-529 Zhoushan (Type 054A frigate); AOR-890 Chao Hu (Type 903 replenishment ship)	~700	7-4-2014	29-4-2016	4-9-2016	1-11-2016	
24th Escort Task Group (Task Group 112)	DDG-112 Harbin (Type 052 destroyer); FFG-579 Handan (Type 054A frigate); AOR-960 Dongping Hu (Type 903 replenishment ship)	~700	10-8-2014	2-9-2016	5-1-2017	8-3-2017	
25th Escort Task Group (Task Group 568)	FFG-568 Hengyang (Type 054A frigate); FFG-569 Yulin (Type 054A frigate); AOR-963 Hong Hu (Type 903 replenishment ship)	~700	17-12-2016	2-1-2017	21-4-2017	12-7-2017	
26th Escort Task Group (Task Group 577)	FFG-577 Huanggang (Type 054A frigate); FFG-578 Yangzhou (Type 054A frigate); AOR-966 Gaoyou Hu (Type 903 replenishment ship)	~700	1-4-2017	21-4-2017	23-8-2017	1-12-2017	
27th Escort Task Group (Task Group 171)	DDG-171 Haikou (Type 052C destroyer); FFG-575 Yueyang (Type 054A frigate); AOR-885 Qinghai Hu (Type 908 replenishment ship)	~700	1-8-2017	23-8-2017	26-12-2017	18-3-2018	
28th Escort Task Group (Task Group 546)	FFG-546 Yancheng (Type 054A frigate); FFG-550 Weifang (Type 054A frigate); AOR-889 Tai Hu (Type 903 replenishment ship)	~700	3-12-2017	26-12-2017	1-5-2018	9-8-2018	
29th Escort Task Group (Task Group 515)	FFG-515 Binzhou (Type 054A frigate); FFG-530 Xuzhou (Type 054A frigate); AOR-886 Qiandao Hu (Type 903 replenishment ship)	~700	4-4-2018	28-4-2018	3-9-2018	4-10-2018	
30th Escort Task Group (Task Group 539)	FFG-539 Wuhu (Type 054A frigate); FFG-579 Handan (Type 054A frigate); AOR-960 Dongping Hu (Type 903 replenishment ship)	~700	6-8-2018	1-9-2018	24-12-2018	27-1-2019	
31st Escort Task Group (Task Group 998)	LPD-998 Kunlun Shan (Type 071 amphibious transport dock); FFG-536 Xuchang (Type 054A frigate); AOR-964 Luoma Hu (Type 903 replenishment ship)	~700	9-12-2018	24-12-2018	28-4-2019	30-5-2019	
32nd Escort Task Group (Task Group 153)	DDG-153 Xi'an (Type 052C destroyer); FFG-599 Anyang (Type 054A frigate); AOR-966 Gaoyou Hu (Type 903 replenishment ship)	~700	4-4-2019	28-4-2019	14-9-2019	1-11-2019	
33rd Escort Task Group (Task Group 117)	DDG-117 Xining (Type 052D destroyer); FFG-550 Weifang (Type 054A frigate); AOR-968 Hoh Xil Hu (Type 903A replenishment ship)	~600	29-8-2019	14-9-2019	20-11-2019	1-1-2020	
34th Escort Task Group (Task Group 118)	DDG-117 Xining (Type 052D destroyer); FFG-550 Weifang (Type 054A frigate); AOR-887 Weishan Hu (Type 903 replenishment ship)	~700	10-6-2020	14-7-2019	14-3-2020	10-4-2020	
35th Escort Task Group (Task Group 122)	DDG-131 Taiyuan (Type 052D destroyer); FFG-532 Jingzhou (Type 054A frigate); AOR-890 Chao Hu (Type 903 replenishment ship)	~600	28-4-2020	14-5-2020	1-8-2020	14-10-2020	
36th Escort Task Group (Task Group 202)	DDG-119 Guiyang (Type 052D destroyer); FFG-542 Zaozhuang (Type 054A frigate); AOR-960 Dongping Hu (Type 903 replenishment ship)	~700	4-9-2020	14-10-2020	Ongoing	Ongoing	

=== 2021–present ===
Fleet (lot)	Ships (number of times)	Formation commander	Departure Escort period Return	Description, including total number of escort batches and vessels
South Sea Fleet (Batch 37)	173 Changsha (1); 569 Yulin (3); 963 Honghu (2)	Wei Bing; Wang Zhanwu (& 700+ personnel)	2021/01/16 (Hainan); 2021/01/31 – 2021/06/07; 2021/06/29 (Sanya)	Lasted 165 days, covering a distance of over 90,000 nautical miles, continuously at sea without docking for rest. Verified and drove away 15 batches of 24 suspicious small boats, provided special escort for 16 batches of 28 Chinese merchant ships, monitored the safety of 11 passing merchant ships, ensuring the safe navigation of escorted ships, completing 40 batches of 64 Chinese and foreign ship escort tasks.
East Sea Fleet; Destroyer; 6th Squadron (Batch 38)	155 Nanjing (1); 578 Yangzhou (2); 966 Gaoyouhu (3)	Shi Weilin; Zhang Xianxing	2021/05/15 (Zhejiang); 2021/06/07 – 2021/10/17; 2021/11/15 (Zhoushan)	Lasted 185 days, covering a distance of over 90,000 nautical miles, continuously at sea without docking for rest. Completed 31 batches of escort tasks for 45 Chinese and foreign ships, providing safety monitoring for 9 passing ships, ensuring the safety of escorted ships.
North Sea Fleet; Destroyer; 1st Squadron (Batch 39)	118 Ürümqi (1); 538 Yantai (2); 889 Taihu (5)	Liu Bo	2021/09/26 (Shandong); 2021/10/17 – 2022/02/04; 2022/03/09 (Qingdao)	Lasted 165 days, covering a distance of over 90,000 nautical miles, efficiently completing 28 batches of escort tasks for 48 Chinese and foreign ships. Since the beginning of the mission, the fleet has strictly implemented epidemic prevention and control measures, organized escort operations meticulously, and adopted various methods such as extended escort and relay escort to ensure the safe navigation of escorted ships, effectively safeguarding the safety of international maritime trade routes and regional peace and stability.
South Sea Fleet (Batch 40)	161 Hohhot (1); 575 Yueyang (2); 907 Luomahu (2)	Zou Fuquan; Yang Yaohua	2022/01/15 (Guangdong); 2022/02/04 – 2022/06/08; 2022/07/05 (Zhanjiang)	Lasted 172 days, covering a distance of nearly 90,000 nautical miles, efficiently completing 30 batches of escort tasks for 50 Chinese and foreign ships. Provided medical assistance to one ship during the mission. Throughout the mission, the fleet strictly implemented epidemic prevention and control measures, organized escort operations meticulously, and adopted various methods such as relay escort, extended escort, and regional escort to ensure the safe navigation of escorted ships.
East Sea Fleet (Batch 41)	132 Suzhou (1); 601 Nantong (1); 890 Chaohu (5)	Wang Mingyong; Liu Hao	2022/05/18 (Zhejiang); 2022/06/08 – 2022/10/15; 2022/11/15 (Zhoushan)	Lasted 182 days, covering a distance of nearly 90,000 nautical miles, efficiently completing 30 batches of escort tasks for 38 Chinese and foreign ships, continuously at sea without docking for rest. Throughout the mission, the fleet strictly implemented epidemic prevention and control measures, organized escort operations meticulously, and adopted various forms such as relay escort, extended escort, and regional escort to ensure the safe navigation of escorted ships.
North Sea Fleet (Batch 42)	123 Huainan (1); 598 Rizhao (1); 903 Kekexilihu (2)	Sun Honglin; Huang Zhongxin	2022/09/21 (Shandong); 2022/10/15 – 2023/02/05; 2023/03/30 (Qingdao)	Lasted 191 days, covering a distance of over 100,000 nautical miles, smoothly completing 20 batches of escort tasks for 29 Chinese and foreign ships, providing safety monitoring for 11 passing merchant ships. After completing the escort mission on February 29, the escort fleet arrived at Richard's Bay, South Africa, to participate in the joint maritime exercise of China, Russia, and South Africa. The exercise focused on "Joint Action to Maintain Shipping and Maritime Economic Activity" and included two phases: port and sea. The maritime exercise included fleet maneuvers, mine clearance, anti-piracy, rescue of distressed vessels, and more than 10 other subjects.
South Sea Fleet (Batch 43)	162 Nanning (1); 574 Sanya (2); 887 Weishanhu (9)	Zhao Lang; Yang Yanhua	2023/01/10 (Guangdong); 2023/02/05 – 2023/06/02; 2023/08/29 (Zhanjiang)	Lasted 232 days, with a total mileage of nearly 120,000 nautical miles. During the mission, the fleet successfully completed 16 batches of escort tasks for 21 ships and provided safety monitoring for 16 passing merchant ships. From April 26 to May 2, two warships, excluding Sanya, went to Sudan to carry out the evacuation task and smoothly transported more than 1,000 Chinese and foreign nationals. After completing the evacuation mission, Nanning-class destroyer went to Pakistan, the UAE, and Iran to participate in the "Peace-23" multinational naval joint exercise, the 16th Abu Dhabi Defense Exhibition, and the 7th Naval Defense Exhibition. Also, it participated in the "Security Link-2023" maritime joint exercise. Friendly visits: Abidjan Port (Côte d'Ivoire), Tema Port (Ghana), Lagos Port (Nigeria), Libreville Port (Gabon), Pointe-Noire Port (Republic of the Congo), technical stop in Cape Town (South Africa), Port Klang (Malaysia)
East Sea Fleet (Batch 44)	156 Zibo (1); 532 Jingzhou (2); 886 Qiandaohu (8)	Sun Bo; Li Jiamei (& 700+ personnel)	2023/04/28 (Zhejiang); 2023/06/02 – 2023/10/02; Return: ? (Zhoushan)	On November 27, the escort fleet arrived in Yangon to conduct a 4-day friendly visit. There were also reports that it conducted naval security exercises with Myanmar. Friendly visits: Muscat (Oman), Shuwaikh Port (Kuwait), Doha (Qatar),Abu Dhabi (UAE), Yangon (Myanmar)
North Sea Fleet (Batch 45)	118 Ürümqi (2); 547 Linyi (1); 902 Dongpinghu (4)		2023/09/12 (Shandong); 2023/10/02 – ? Return: ? (Qingdao)	

== See also ==
- 7th Marine Brigade
- People's Liberation Army Support Base in Djibouti

== Sources ==
- Erickson, Andrew S.; Strange, Austin M. (November 2013). No Substitute for Experience (Report). CMSI Red Books. Vol. 10. United States Naval War College.
- Saunders, Phillip C.; Ding, Arthur S.; Scobell, Andrew; Yang, Andrew N.D.; Joel, Wuthnow, eds. (2019). Chairman Xi Remakes the PLA: Assessing Chinese Military Reforms. Washington, D.C.: National Defense University Press. ISBN 978-1070233420.
