= Chinese destroyer Yinchuan (175) =

Type 025D destroyer of the PLA Navy

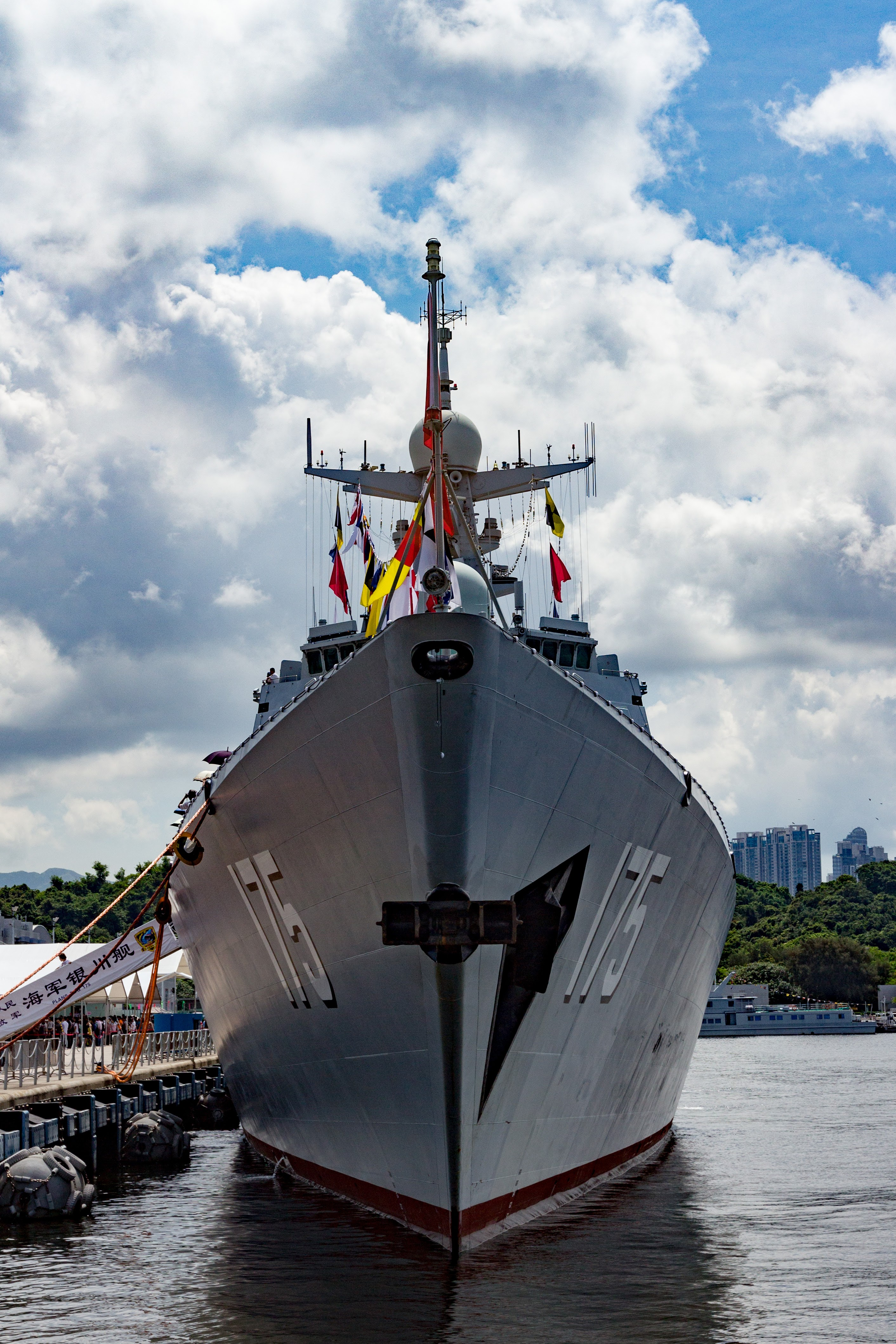
- Yinchuan on 10 July 2017

History

China
- Name: Yinchuan
- Namesake: Yinchuan; (银川)
- Builder: Jiangnan Shipyard, Shanghai
- Launched: 28 March 2014
- Commissioned: 12 July 2016
- Identification: Pennant number: 175
- Status: Active

General characteristics
- Class & type: Type 052D destroyer
- Displacement: 7,500 tons (full load)
- Length: 157 m (515 ft)
- Beam: 17 m (56 ft)
- Draught: 6 m (20 ft)
- Propulsion: Combined diesel or gas
- Sensors & processing systems: Type 346 radar; Type 518 radar; Variable depth sonar; Towed array sonar
- Armament: 1 x 130 mm gun; 1 × HQ-10 short-range SAM 24-cell launcher; 64 cell VLS; HHQ-9 SAM; YJ-18 SSM; CY-5 ASW; Type 730 CIWS
- Aircraft carried: Helicopter
- Aviation facilities: Hangar; Helipad

Yinchuan (175) is a Type 052D destroyer of the People's Liberation Army Navy. She was commissioned on 12 July 2016.

== Development and design ==
The basic ship type and layout of the Type 052D guided-missile destroyer is the same as that of the Type 052C destroyer, but compared to the earlier Type 052C destroyer, the Type 052D superstructure has a larger inclination angle and provides better stealth performance. At the same time, the helicopter hangar, located on the left side of the hull axis on the Type 052C, was changed to the center axis of the ship on the Type 052D; a pair of small boat storage compartments were added on both sides of the hangar, similar to the design on the Type 054A frigate.

The close in weapon system is composed of a H/PJ-12 short-range defense weapon system located in front of the bridge and a 24 Hongqi-10 air defense missile system located on the top of the hangar, which is combined to form a ladder interception. The original 100mm naval gun was replaced by a higher height and better stealth model H/PJ45 naval gun. On May 13, 2019, the extended version of the 052DL was exposed. The hull of the 052DL is basically the same as the 052D, but the helicopter deck is lengthened to prepare for the Harbin Z-20 to board the ship.

The Type 52D is the first Chinese surface combatant to use canister-based universal VLS, as opposed to the concentric type VLS carried aboard earlier vessels. 64 cells are carried; 32 forward and 32 aft. The VLS is reportedly an implementation of the GJB 5860-2006 standard. The VLS may fire the extended-range variant of the HHQ-9 surface-to-air missile, YJ-18 anti-ship cruise missiles, and CY-5 anti-submarine missiles.

== Construction and career ==
Yinchuan was the fourth ship of the class and launched on 28 March 2014 at the Jiangnan Shipyard in Shanghai. She was launched in 2014 and commissioned on 12 July 2016.

On 9 June 2017, Yinchuan visited Ngong Shuen Chau Naval Base, Hong Kong and was opened to public.

Yinchuan participated in the Sea Guardians-2020 exercise hosted between Chinese Navy and Pakistan Navy. A carnival was hosted aboard the ship while off the Gulf of Aden.

Annual High Sea Joint Training Exercises were conducted on 6 April 2021, which consists of Yinchuan, Hengyang, Chaganhu, Wuzhi Shan and Tianshuxing.
