= Chinese destroyer Nanjing (155) =

Type 025D destroyer of the PLA Navy

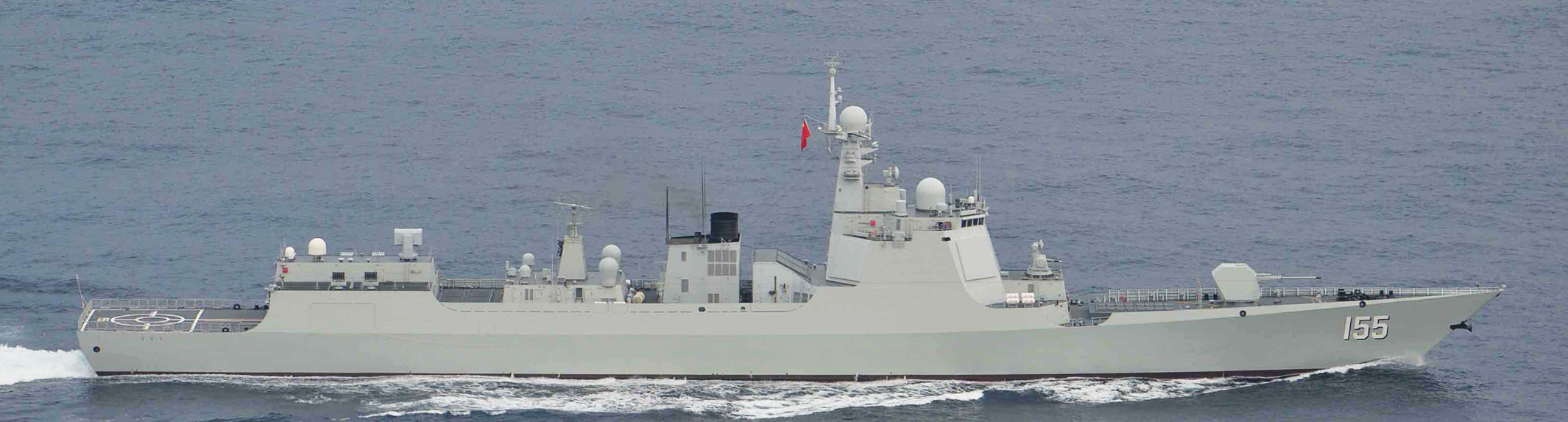
- Nanjing underway on 27 November 2019

History

China
- Name: Nanjing
- Namesake: Nanjing; (南京)
- Builder: Jiangnan Shipyard, Shanghai
- Launched: 28 December 2015
- Commissioned: 2 April 2018
- Identification: Pennant number: 155
- Status: Active

General characteristics
- Class & type: Type 052D destroyer
- Displacement: 7,500 tons (full load)
- Length: 157 m (515 ft)
- Beam: 17 m (56 ft)
- Draught: 6 m (20 ft)
- Propulsion: Combined diesel or gas
- Speed: 30 kn (35 mph)
- Range: 4,519 nmi (5,200 mi)
- Sensors & processing systems: Type 346 radar; Type 518 radar; Variable depth sonar; Towed array sonar
- Armament: 1 x 130 mm gun; 1 × HQ-10 short-range SAM 24-cell launcher; 64 cell VLS; HHQ-9 SAM; YJ-18 SSM; CY-5 ASW; Type 730 CIWS
- Aircraft carried: Helicopter
- Aviation facilities: Hangar; Helipad

Nanjing (155) is a Type 052D destroyer of the People's Liberation Army Navy. She was commissioned on 2 April 2018.

== Development and design ==
The basic ship type and layout of the Type 052D guided-missile destroyer is the same as that of the Type 052C destroyer. Compared to the earlier Type 052C destroyer, the Type 052D superstructure has a larger inclination angle and provides better stealth performance. At the same time, the helicopter hangar was moved from being on the left side of the hull to the center axis of the ship. A pair of small boat storage compartments were added on both sides of the hangar, similar to the design on the Type 054A frigate.

The closed in weapons system is composed of a H/PJ-12 short-range defense weapons system located in front of the bridge and a 24 Hongqi-10 air defense missile system located on the top of the hangar. They are combined to form a ladder interception. The original 100mm naval gun was replaced by a higher height and better stealth model H/PJ45 naval gun.

The Type 52D is the first Chinese surface combatant to use canister-based universal VLS, as opposed to the concentric type VLS carried onboard earlier vessels. 64 cells are carried, 32 forward and 32 aft. The VLS is reportedly an implementation of the GJB 5860-2006 standard. The VLS may fire the extended-range variant of the HHQ-9 surface-to-air missile, YJ-18 anti-ship cruise missiles and CY-5 anti-submarine missiles.

== Construction and career ==
Nanjing was the eighth ship of the class and launched on 28 December 2015 at the Jiangnan Shipyard in Shanghai. She was commissioned on 2 April 2018.
