= Chinese destroyer Yinchuan =

A number of vessels of the People’s Liberation Army Navy have borne the name Yinchuan, after the capital Yinchuan.

- Chinese destroyer Yinchuan (107), in service 1971–2007. Now a Museum ship in Yinchuan.
- Chinese destroyer Yinchuan (175), a Type 052D destroyer, in service since 2016.
