= Chinese destroyer Nanjing =

A number of vessels of the People's Liberation Army Navy have borne the name Nanjing, after the provincial capital Nanjing.

- Chinese destroyer Nanjing (131), in service 1977–2012. Now a Museum ship in Shanghai.
- Chinese destroyer Nanjing (155), a Type 052D destroyer, in service since 2018.
