= Type 052D destroyer =

Class of guided missile destroyers in the Chinese People's Liberation Army Navy

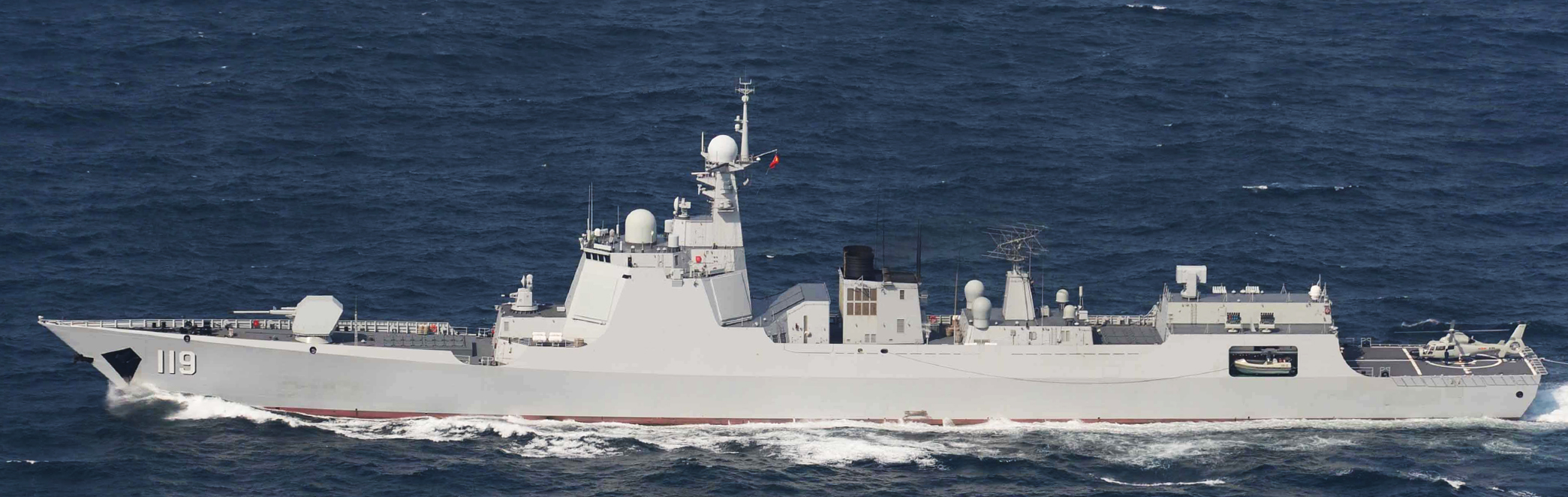
- Guiyang (119) in the East China Sea

Class overview
- Name: Initial variant: Type 052D destroyer (first 13 ships); Extended flight deck variant: Type 052DL destroyer
- Builders: Jiangnan Shipyard; Dalian Shipyard
- Operators: People's Liberation Army Navy
- Preceded by: Type 052C (based on hull family); Type 051C (based on commissioning date)
- Succeeded by: Type 055 destroyer
- Built: February 2012–present
- In service: March 2014–present
- Active: 35

General characteristics
- Type: Guided-missile destroyer
- Displacement: Type 052D: 7,500 tons (full load); Type 052DL: 7,700 tons (full load)
- Length: Type 052D: 156 m (511 ft 10 in) - 157 m (515 ft 1 in); Type 052DL: 162 m (531 ft 6 in)
- Beam: Type 052D: 17 m (55 ft 9 in) - 18 m (59 ft 1 in); Type 052DL: 17.2 m (56 ft 5 in)
- Draught: Type 052D: 6 m (19 ft 8 in); Type 052DL: 6.2 m (20 ft 4 in)
- Propulsion: CODOG; 2 × QC-280 gas turbines; 2 × diesels
- Speed: 30 knots (56 km/h; 35 mph)
- Range: 4,500 nmi (8,300 km; 5,200 mi) at 15 kn (28 km/h; 17 mph)
- Complement: 280
- Sensors & processing systems: Type 346A multifunction 3D AESA radar; Type 518 or Type 517B air search radar; Type 364 surface search radar; Type 366 over-the-horizon (OTP) radar; Type 344 main gun fire control radar; Type 760 navigation radar; SJD-9 hull mounted sonar; SJG-311 variable depth sonar; Towed array sonar
- Electronic warfare & decoys: NRJ-6A
- Armament: 1 × H/PJ-45 130mm naval gun; 1 × HHQ-10 SAM-based CIWS (24-cell launcher); 1 × Type 730 or Type 1130 Golden Shield gun-based CIWS; 64 × GJB 5860-2006 universal VLS cells for: HHQ-9 family surface-to-air missiles: HHQ-9; HHQ-9B; YJ-18 anti-ship cruise missile; YJ-20 anti-ship ballistic missile; CJ-10 land-attack cruise missile; CY-5 anti-submarine missile; 2 × sets of torpedo tubes for ASW torpedoes
- Aircraft carried: Type 052D: Harbin Z-9 helicopter; Type 052DL: Harbin Z-20 helicopter
- Aviation facilities: Hangar; Landing pad

The Type 052D destroyer (NATO/OSD reporting name: Luyang III-class destroyer) is a class of guided-missile destroyers in the Chinese People's Liberation Army Navy (PLAN), and currently one of the most numerous principal surface combatant classes in service of the PLAN Surface Force. The initial variant of the ship class is known as Type 052D and extended flight deck variant is known as Type 052DL.

The Type 052D is a larger variant of the Type 052C, and has flat-paneled active electronically scanned array (AESA) radar, The Type 052D uses a canister-type (instead of 052C's revolver-type) vertical launching system (VLS), which is not limited to surface-to-air missiles, making it China's first dedicated multi-purpose VLS-equipped destroyer.

== Etymology ==
The Type 052Ds are fitted with the four-panel Type 346A (NATO reporting name: Dragon Eye) active electronically scanned array (AESA) radar system. Chinese media informally calls the Type 052D the Chinese Aegis (Chinese: 中华神盾; pinyin: Zhōnghuá Shéndùn), portraying it as a peer of contemporary United States Navy ships equipped with the Aegis Combat System. The appearance of the Type 052D, with flat-panelled radar and canister-based vertical launch system, has encouraged this informal use.

== Design ==
=== Sensors ===
The Type 052D is equipped with Type 346A AESA and Type 518 L-band radar.

The Type 052D is also equipped with both variable depth (VDS) and linear towed array sonar. The VDS is deployed through a hinged opening in the transom by a hydraulic lifting mechanism. The VDS body is a streamlined fairing fitted with Y-shaped hydrodynamic vanes for towing stability.

=== Armament ===
The Type 052D is the first Chinese surface combatant to use canister-based universal VLS, as opposed to the concentric type VLS carried aboard earlier vessels. 64 cells are carried, 32 forward and 32 aft. The VLS is reportedly an implementation of the GJB 5860-2006 standard. The VLS may fire the extended-range variant of the HHQ-9 surface-to-air missile, YJ-18 anti-ship cruise missiles, CJ-10 land-attack cruise missiles, and CY-5 anti-submarine missiles.

The Type 052D has a 130 mm (5.1 in) H/PJ-45 main gun, and a 7-barrelled Type 730 close-in weapon system (CIWS). The Type 052D has the ability to launch YJ-20 hypersonic anti-ship ballistic missiles.

=== Data links ===
The Type 052D may be using the joint service integrated datalink system (JSIDLS) and naval common tactical data link (NCTDL). JSIDLS is equivalent to Link 16 and was certified in June 2012. NCTDL is a next-generation two-way encrypted data link with support for electro-optic and laser pod UAVs; it replaces the older HN-900.

=== Propulsion ===
The powerplant is a combined diesel or gas (CODOG) system with two QC-280 gas turbines and two diesel engines.

The machinery drives two shafts for a maximum speed of 30 knots (56 km/h; 35 mph).

=== Aviation ===
The Type 052D is equipped with a hangar and landing pad and normally carries a Harbin Z-9 helicopter.

A stretched variant, unofficially referred to as Type 052DL, has a flight deck extended by four metres (13 ft 1 in). The extended flight deck is likely intended for the Harbin Z-20 helicopter. The variant was under construction by 2016, with the first unit (Zibo) launched in 2018 and commissioned in 2020. Construction of further units to this design are continuing at the rate of three or four vessels per year.

== Ships of class ==
As of March 2026, the total quantity of the Type 052D class is 35 ships.

Pennant no.	Name	Namesake	Builder	Launched	Commissioned	Fleet	Status
Type 052D
172	昆明 / Kunming	Provincial capital of Yunnan, Kunming	Jiangnan Shipyard (Group) Co., Ltd., Changxingdao	28 August 2012	21 March 2014	South Sea Fleet	Active
173	长沙 / Changsha	Provincial capital of Hunan, Changsha	Jiangnan Shipyard, Changxingdao	18 December 2012	12 August 2015	South Sea Fleet	Active
174	合肥 / Hefei	Provincial capital of Anhui, Hefei	Jiangnan Shipyard, Changxingdao	1 March 2013	12 December 2015	South Sea Fleet	Active
175	银川 / Yinchuan	Regional capital of Ningxia, Yinchuan	Jiangnan Shipyard, Changxingdao	28 March 2014	12 July 2016	South Sea Fleet	Active
117	西宁 / Xining	Provincial capital of Qinghai, Xining	Jiangnan Shipyard, Changxingdao	26 August 2014	22 January 2017	North Sea Fleet	Active
154	厦门 / Xiamen	City of Xiamen	Jiangnan Shipyard, Changxingdao	30 December 2014	10 June 2017	East Sea Fleet	Active
118	乌鲁木齐 / Ürümqi	Regional capital of Xinjiang, Ürümqi	Jiangnan Shipyard, Changxingdao	7 July 2015	12 March 2018	North Sea Fleet	Active
155	南京 / Nanjing	Provincial capital of Jiangsu, Nanjing	Jiangnan Shipyard, Changxingdao	28 December 2015	2 April 2018	East Sea Fleet	Active
131	太原 / Taiyuan	Provincial capital of Shanxi, Taiyuan	Jiangnan Shipyard, Changxingdao	28 July 2016	3 December 2018	East Sea Fleet	Active
119	贵阳 / Guiyang	Provincial capital of Guizhou, Guiyang	Dalian Shipbuilding; Industry Company	28 November 2015	22 February 2019	North Sea Fleet	Active
161	呼和浩特 / Hohhot	Regional capital of Inner Mongolia, Hohhot	Jiangnan Shipyard, Changxingdao	26 December 2016	12 January 2019	South Sea Fleet	Active
120	成都 / Chengdu	Provincial capital of Sichuan, Chengdu	Dalian Shipbuilding; Industry Company	3 August 2016	22 November 2019	North Sea Fleet	Active
121	齐齐哈尔 / Qiqihar	City of Qiqihar	Dalian Shipbuilding; Industry Company	26 June 2017	14 August 2020	North Sea Fleet	Active
Type 052DL (stretched)
156	淄博 / Zibo	City of Zibo	Jiangnan Shipyard, Changxingdao	14 August 2018	14 January 2020	East Sea Fleet	Active
122	唐山 / Tangshan	City of Tangshan	Jiangnan Shipyard, Changxingdao	7 July 2018	14 August 2020	North Sea Fleet	Active
132	苏州 / Suzhou	City of Suzhou	Jiangnan Shipyard, Changxingdao	18 December 2018	15 January 2021	East Sea Fleet	Active
123	淮南 / Huainan	City of Huainan	Jiangnan Shipyard, Changxingdao	15 April 2019	11 February 2021	North Sea Fleet	Active
162	南宁 / Nanning	Provincial capital of Guangxi, Nanning	Jiangnan Shipyard, Changxingdao	23 February 2019	12 April 2021	South Sea Fleet	Active
124	开封 / Kaifeng	City of Kaifeng	Dalian Shipbuilding; Industry Company	10 May 2019	16 April 2021	North Sea Fleet	Active
164	桂林 / Guilin	City of Guilin	Jiangnan Shipyard, Changxingdao	26 September 2019	September 2021	South Sea Fleet	Active
165	湛江 / Zhanjiang	City of Zhanjiang	Dalian Shipbuilding; Industry Company	10 May 2019	25 December 2021	South Sea Fleet	Active
133	包头 / Baotou	City of Baotou	Jiangnan Shipyard, Changxingdao	28 August 2019	28 December 2021	East Sea Fleet	Active
163	焦作 / Jiaozuo	City of Jiaozuo	Jiangnan Shipyard, Changxingdao	28 December 2019	17 January 2022	South Sea Fleet	Active
134	绍兴 / Shaoxing	City of Shaoxing (in Zhejiang)	Dalian Shipbuilding; Industry Company	26 December 2019	February 2022	East Sea Fleet	Active
157	丽水 / Lishui	City of Lishui	Dalian Shipbuilding; Industry Company	30 August 2020	June 2022	East Sea Fleet	Active
125	沧州 / Cangzhou	City of Cangzhou	Dalian Shipbuilding; Industry Company			North Sea Fleet	Active
126	菏泽 / Heze	City of Heze					Active
127	驻马店 / Zhumadian	City of Zhumadian					Active
128	甘孜 / Ganzi	Prefecture of Ganzi					Active
135	达州 / Dazhou	City of Dazhou	Jiangnan Shipyard, Changxingdao			East Sea Fleet	Active
158							Active
159	日喀则 / Rikaze	City of Rikaze					Active
166	渭南 / Weinan	City of Weinan	Dalian Shipbuilding; Industry Company			South Sea Fleet	Active
176	娄底 / Loudi	City of Loudi					Active
177	铜川 / Tongchuan	City of Tongchuan					Active

== Gallery ==
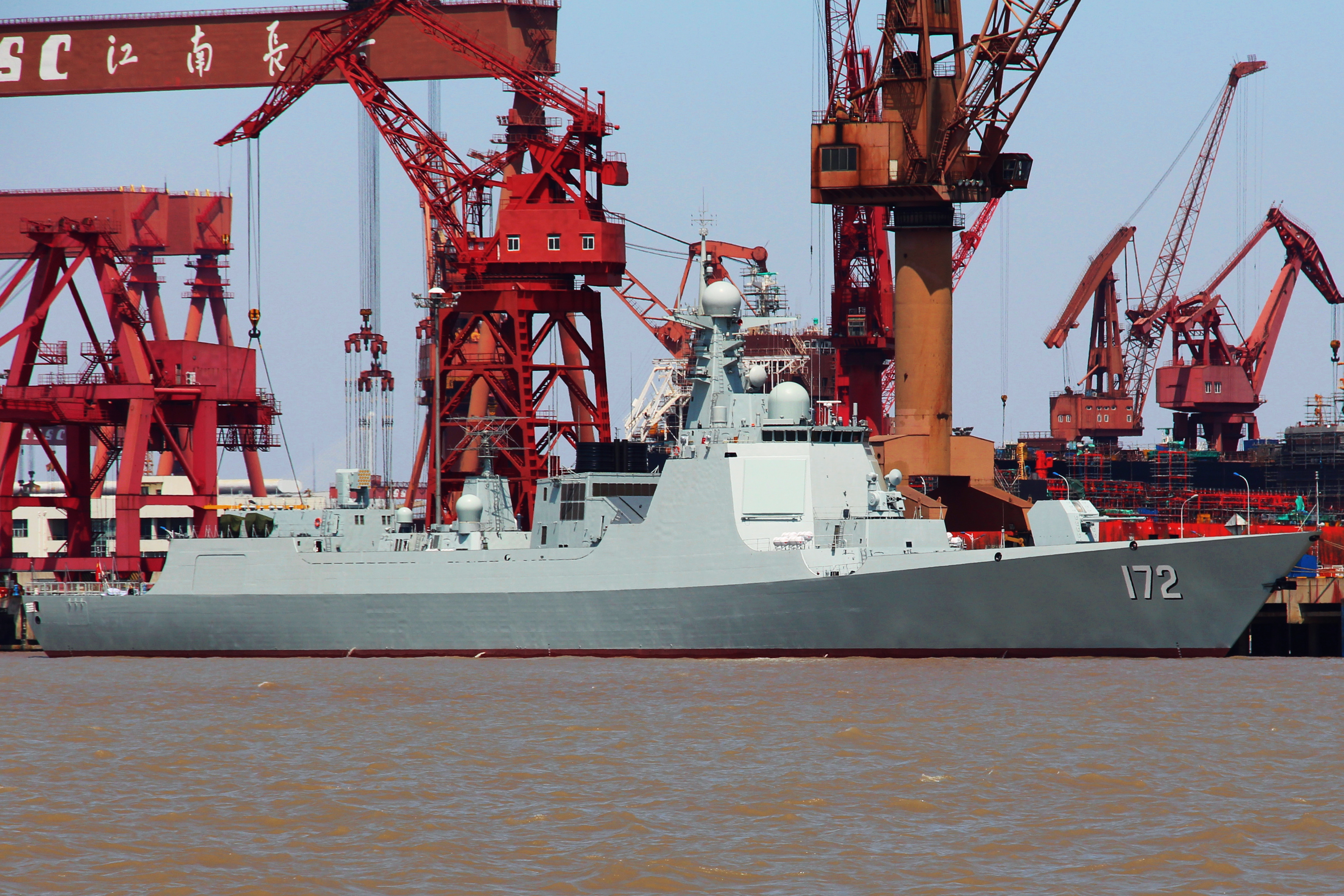
Kunming (172) at Changxing Island

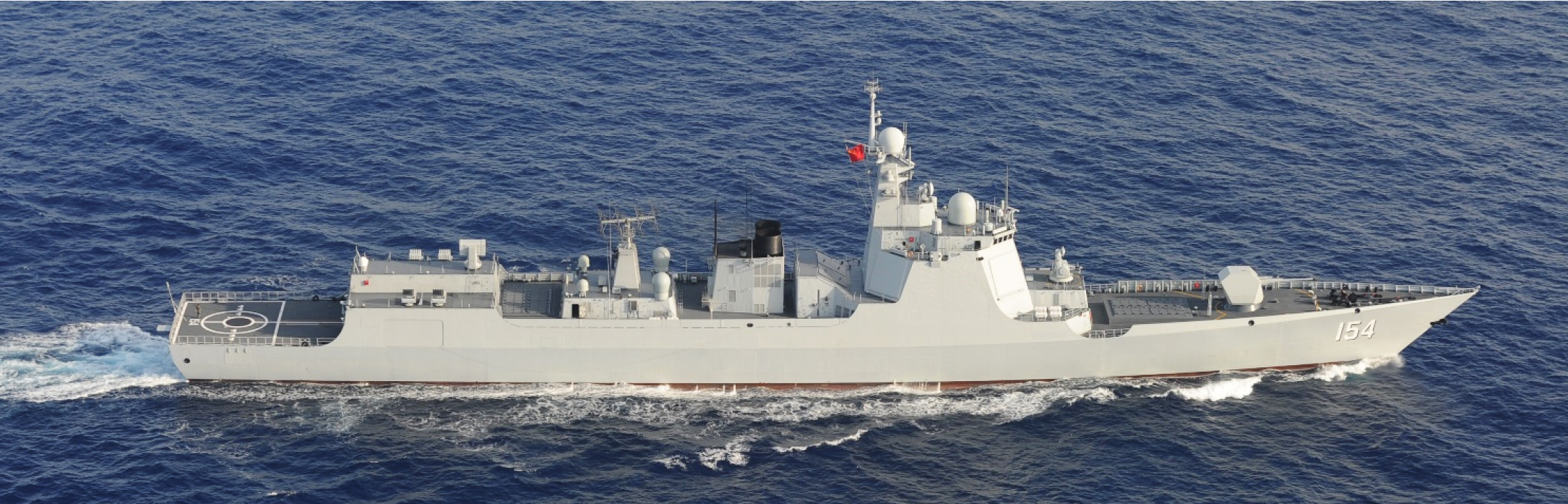
Xiamen (154) on 20 April 2018

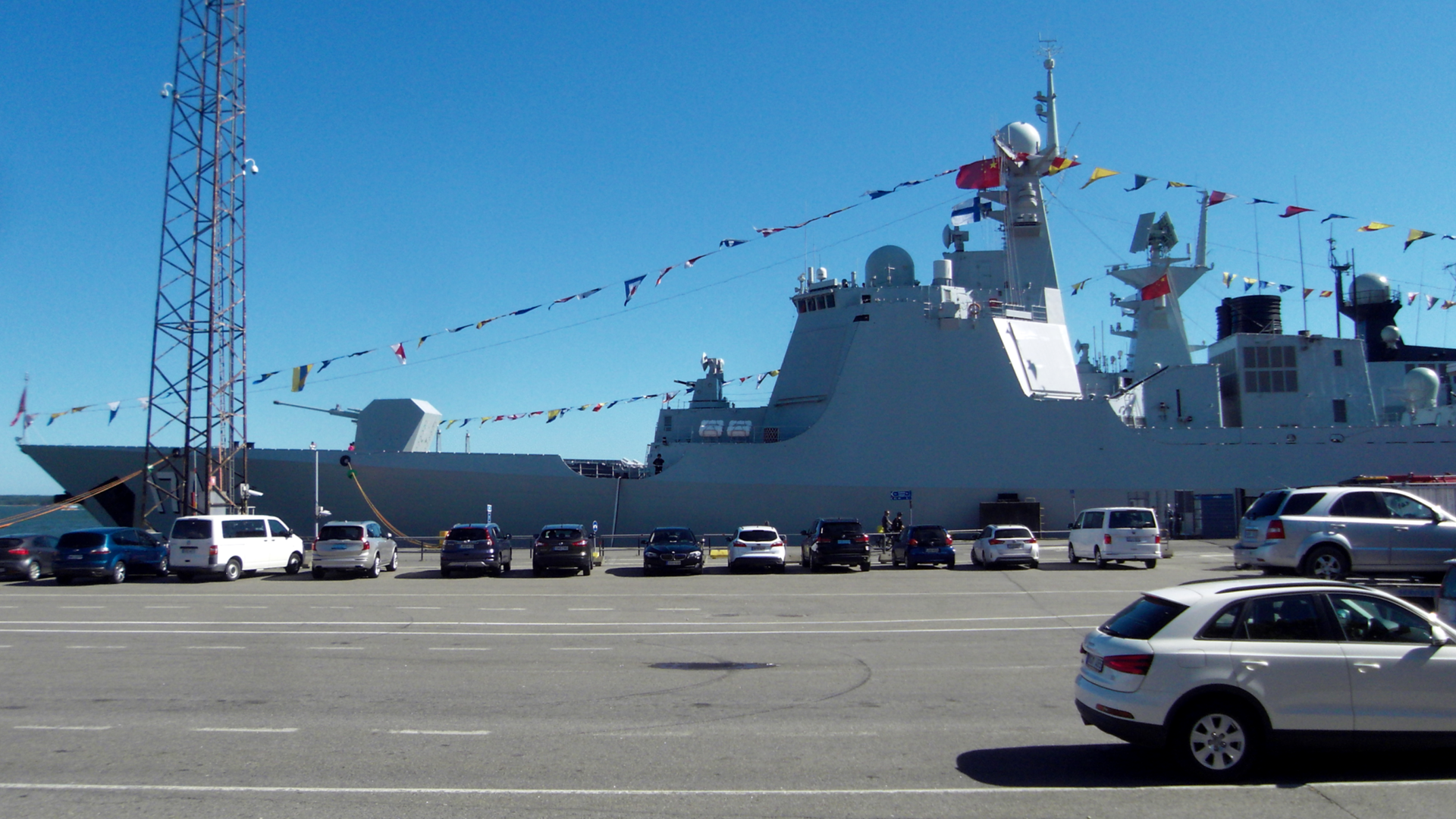
Hefei (174) during a visit to Helsinki in 2017

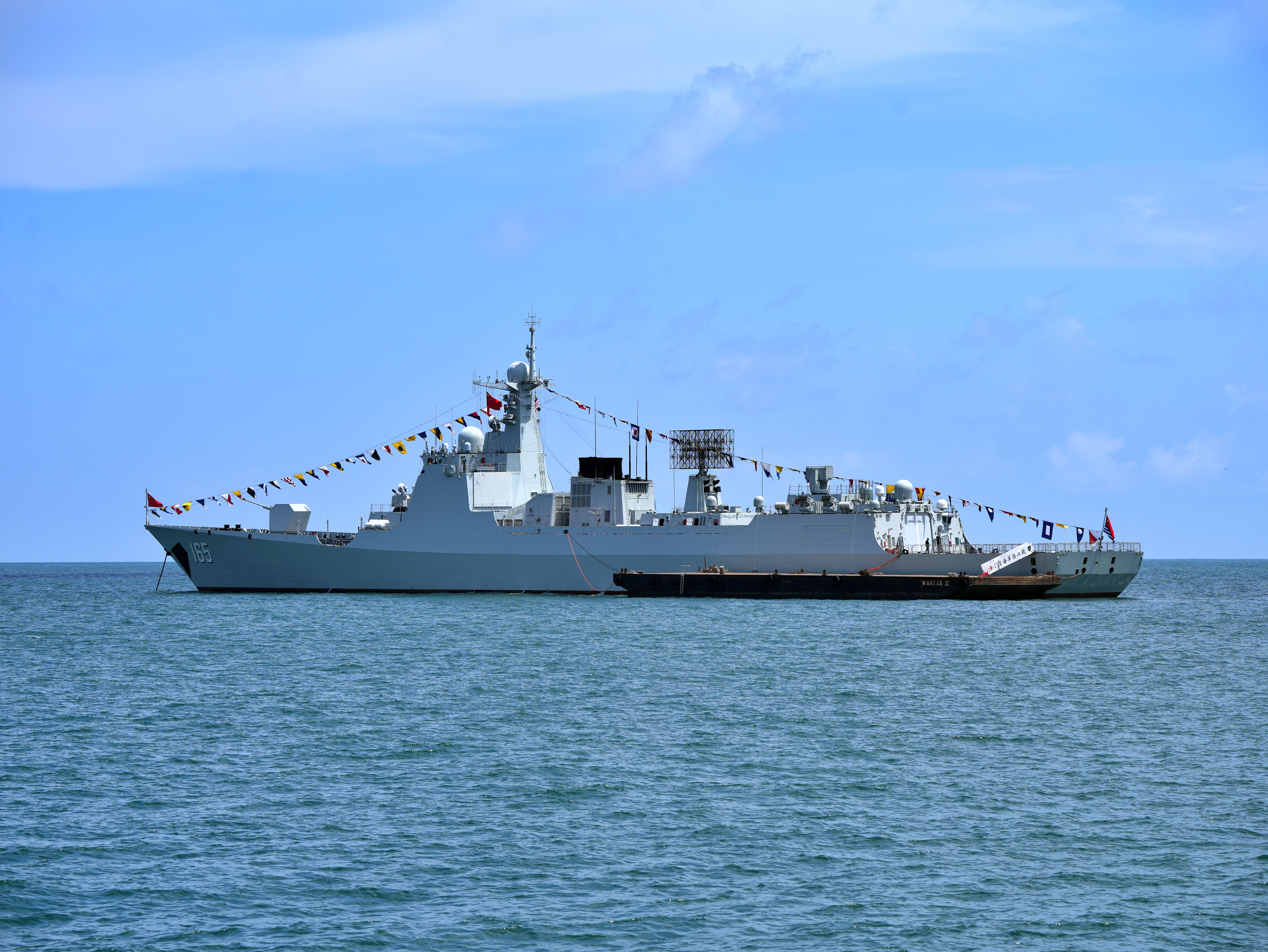
Zhanjiang (165) during a visit to Langkawi, Malaysia in 2023

== See also ==
- List of destroyer classes in service

Equivalent destroyers of the same era

- Hobart class
- Visakhapatnam class
- Asahi class
- Type 45
- Choe Hyon class

== Bibliography ==
- Holmes, James R. (15 February 2018). Fleet Design with Chinese Characteristics (PDF) (Report). United States-China Economic and Security Review Commission. Archived (PDF) from the original on 7 July 2018.
- Li, Nan (2017). "Why Is the Surface Fleet Gaining Importance?". CSMI Red Book. 14. United States Naval War College: 43–54. ISBN 978-1-935352-45-7. Archived from the original on 8 June 2019.
- McDevitt, Michael (2017). "The Modern PLA Navy Destroyer Force". CSMI Red Book. 14. United States Naval War College: 55–65. ISBN 978-1-935352-45-7. Archived from the original on 8 June 2019.
