= Type 366 radar =

Chinese radar

Type 366
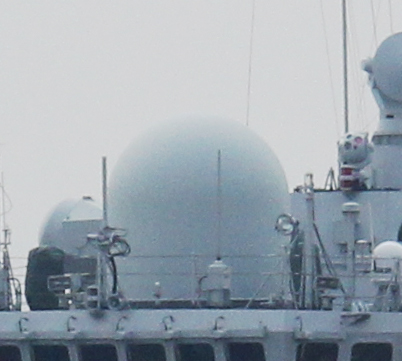
- Type 366 radome on a Type 054A frigate
- Country of origin: China
- Introduced: Mid-2000s
- Type: Surveillance; Fire-control
- Range: 250 kilometres (160 mi) (active); 450 kilometres (280 mi) (passive)
- Other names: H/LJP-366; "Band Stand" (NATO reporting name)

The Type 366 is a Chinese naval over-the-horizon (OTP) radar used for surveillance and fire-control. It is a development of the Russian Mineral-ME OTP radar which China imported with the Sovremenny-class destroyer in the 1990s.

It appeared on most major surface units of the People's Liberation Army Navy and was also used in ground installations.

== See also ==
- List of radars § China

== Sources ==
- Dahm, J. Michael (2020). Air and Surface Radar (PDF) (Report). South China Sea Military Capabilities Series. Johns Hopkins University Applied Physics Laboratory.
- Hundman, Eric (March 2025). China's Air Defense Radar Industrial Base. China Aerospace Studies Institute (Report).
