= GJB 5860-2006 =

Chinese military standard

GJB 5860-2006 (Chinese: 国家军用标准 5860-2006; pinyin: Guójiā Jūnyòng Biāozhǔn 5860-2006; lit. 'National Military Standard 5860-2006') is a Chinese military technical standard describing a vertical launching system (VLS) for all types of missiles aboard surface combatants.

Cells have a square crossection with 850 millimetres (33 in) sides, and may be 9 m (30 ft), 7 m (23 ft), or 3.3 m (11 ft) deep. Each cell carries one missile; the shortest cell may carry four missiles. Hot and cold launches are supported; hot launching uses the concentric canister launch (CCL) approach with exhaust vents within each launch cell.

The first operational implementation is believed to be the VLS aboard the People's Liberation Army Navy's Type 052D destroyer.

== See also ==
- H/AKJ-16 - an older Chinese hot-launch VLS.
- K-VLS - A vertical launching system of Republic of Korea Navy.
- Mark 41 Vertical Launching System - A vertical launching system of United States Navy.
- Poliment-Redut - A vertical launching system of Russian Navy, navalized version of S-350.
- 3S-14 - A vertical launching system of Russian Navy for cruise, anti-ship and anti-submarine missiles.
- Sylver - A vertical launching system designed by DCNS.
