= HQ-10 =

Chinese short range surface-to-air missile designed as naval point defense weapon

HHQ-10 / FL-3000N
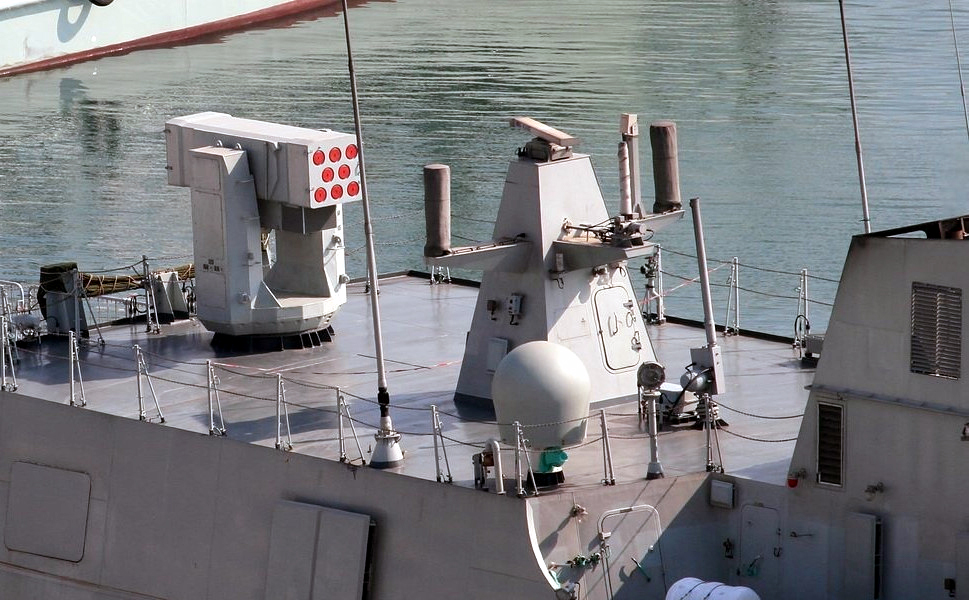
- HHQ-10 8-round launcher on a Type 056 corvette
- Type: SAM-based CIWS
- Place of origin: China

Service history
- In service: 2013
- Used by: China

Production history
- Manufacturer: Shanghai Academy of Spaceflight Technology (SAST)

Specifications
- Mass: 20 kg
- Length: 2 m
- Diameter: 127 mm
- Warhead: 3 kg HE FRAG
- Detonation mechanism: infrared proximity fuse
- Engine: rocket motor
- Propellant: solid fuel
- Operational range: 0.5 km to 9 km
- Flight altitude: 1.5 m to 6 km
- Guidance system: Imaging infrared (IIR)

The HQ-10 (simplified Chinese: 红旗-10; traditional Chinese: 紅旗-10; pinyin: Hóng Qí-10; lit. 'Red Banner-10') is a short range surface-to-air missile designed by China Aerospace Science and Technology Corporation (CASC), currently in service as a point defense missile system aboard PLA Navy warships.

== Development ==
The system was first adopted by the Liaoning aircraft carrier and the Type 056 corvette in 2011.

== Design ==
The design of the HQ-10 places it in a similar role to the American Rolling Airframe Missile, both serving as point defense missile systems.

Each HQ-10 missile has a length of around 2 m and a width of around 0.12 m. The missile has a range of 9 km against subsonic targets and 6 km against supersonic targets, and a flight altitude as low as 1.5 meters.

The guidance system is said to be an advanced matrix imaging infrared (IIR) seeker. However, it appears to have a pair of horn like protrusions at the front of the missile which may indicate the existence of passive radar seekers or semi-active radar seekers.

The launcher is designed to be customisable in terms of number of missiles carried. Possible different configurations include 8, 15, 18 and 24 missiles, which can be deployed on different warships based on size and suitability. It is claimed that the system can launch missiles in about 10 seconds.

== Variants ==
HQ-10
HQ-10A
Naval defense missile, revealed in September 2025.
HHQ-10
PLA Navy designation for naval version

== FL-3000N ==
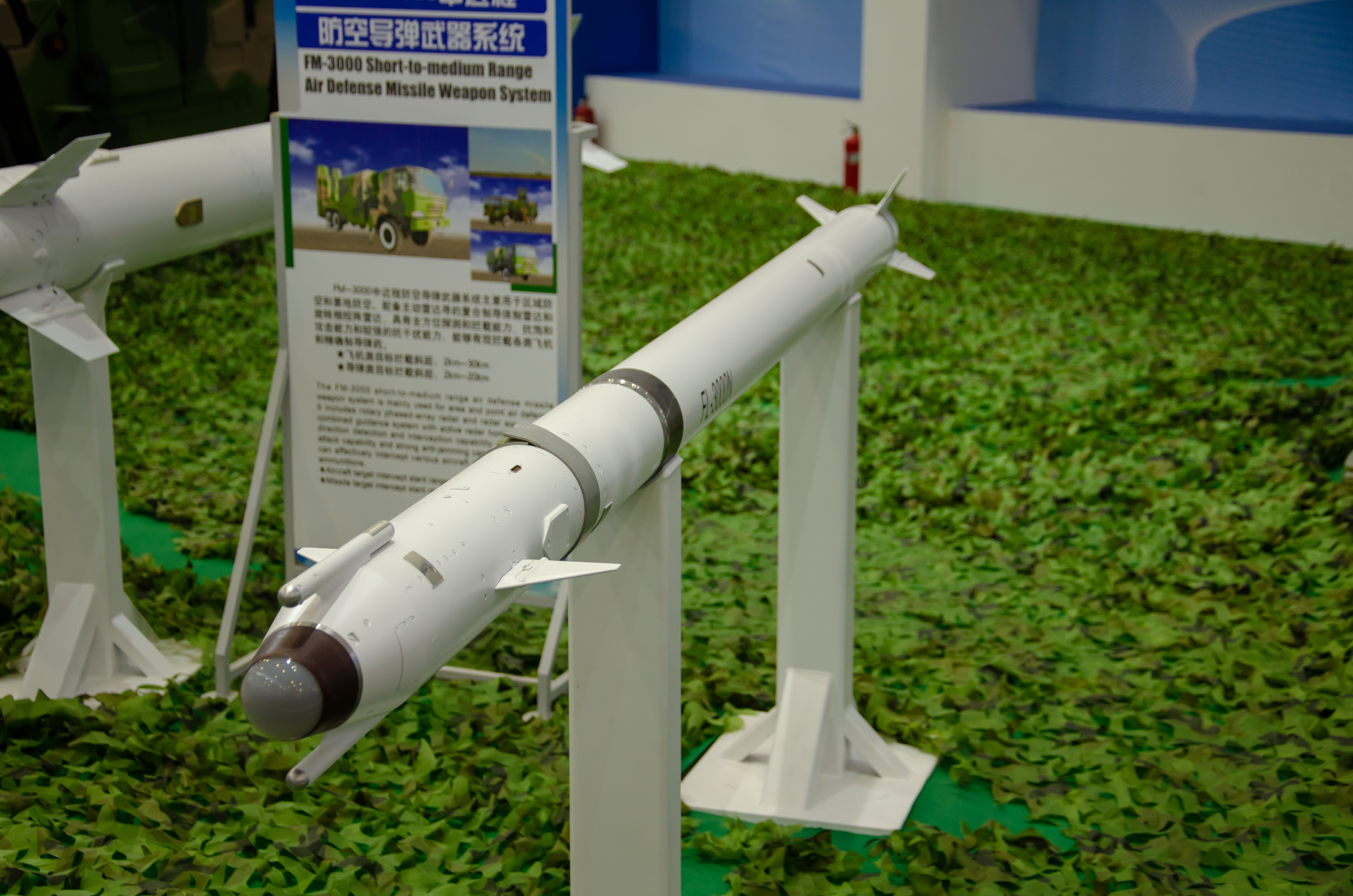
FL-3000N missile on display

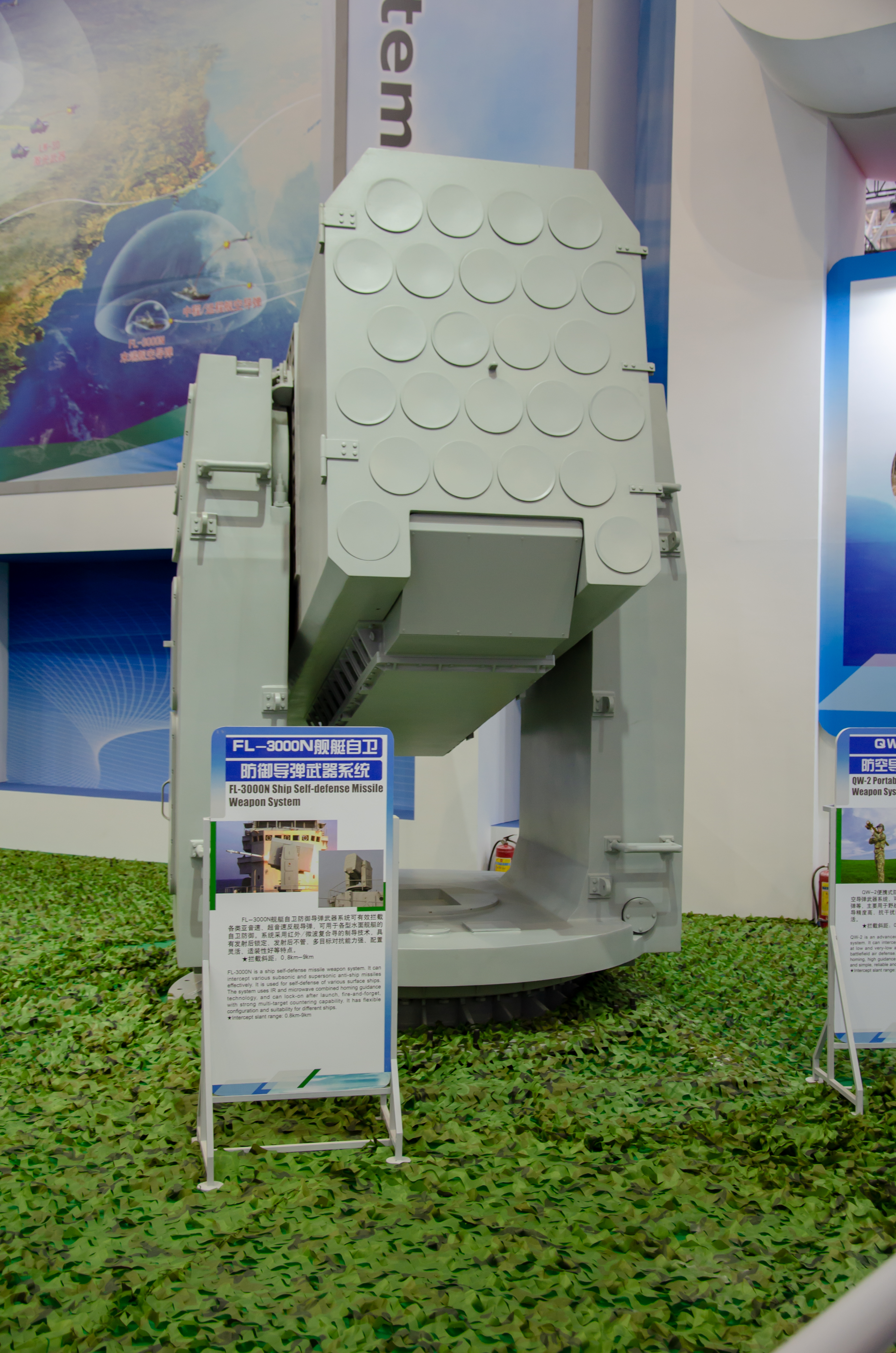
FL-3000N missile launcher mockup on display

The FL-3000N is a missile that commonly replaces the HQ-10 on ships exported to other countries, hence it is commonly dubbed the export version of the HQ-10. However, that is not an official designation. Although the FL-3000N shares many characteristics with the HQ-10, they are not the same missile.

The FL-3000N was developed by China Aerospace Science and Industry Corporation (CASIC), and was intended to be a competitor to the HQ-10, which was developed by China Aerospace Science and Technology Corporation (CASC). The FL-3000N lost the tender to the HQ-10 and thereafter obtained export authorisation, leading to its current status as a de facto export version of the HQ-10.

There are some notable differences between the FL-3000N and the HQ-10. It has different missile fins which are triangular in shape compared to the rectangular fins of the HQ-10. The launchers come in the same 24 missile loadouts as the HQ-10, but its design is slightly different and missiles are differently arranged. The FL-3000N missile uses a combined guidance system that incorporates both imaging infrared (ImIR) guidance and millimeter wave radar (MMW) guidance. There are a pair of horn like protrusions mounted on the ImIR seeker at the tip of the missile, and these two protrusions are the passive radar seekers. An optional ImIR only guidance is also available and the missile is a fire and forget weapon. The fire control system (FCS) of FL-3000N can simultaneously control two launchers, and can be integrated into other FCS on board ships. Alternatively, FL-3000N is also capable being directly controlled by other FCS on board ships. The system is usually fully automatic without human intervention, but manual operation can be inserted when needed. An optional extra magazine with automated loading system is available for larger warships when there is enough space provided. On smaller surface combatants where space is limited, the extra magazine with the automated loading system is eliminated and the reload is done manually. To further use confined space, an 8-cell launcher and a quadruple launcher are also available. Additionally, a single-cell launcher is available for mounting on existing naval gun mounts.

== Deployment ==
The HHQ-10 naval version is currently deployed aboard various PLA Navy warships, such as the Type 056 corvettes, Type 054 frigates, Type 956E destroyers (refit), Type 052D class destroyers, Type 055 class destroyers, Liaoning aircraft carrier, Shandong aircraft carrier and in the future, the Type 075 LHD.

The FL-3000N has been exported to countries such as Bangladesh and Nigeria.

== Operators ==
=== Current operators ===
- Algeria
- Bangladesh
  - FL-3000N
- Cambodia
- China
- Nigeria
  - FL-3000

== See also ==
- List of missiles
