= Type 518 radar =

Air surveillance radar of the Chinese Navy

The Type 518 radar is a Chinese high-performance L band long-range shipboard air surveillance radar. The Type 518 radar may be installed on destroyers or heavy tonnage naval vessels to detect long-range high-altitude aircraft in adverse natural noise and active electronic jamming environments.

The Type 518 has been installed and deployed on the Luhu-class destroyer and the Type 052D destroyer.

It is manufactured and exported by the Nanjing Changjiang Machinery Group Co Ltd (南京长江机器集团电子装备有限公司).

== Specifications ==
- L - band
- Wide frequency band, pulse-to-pulse frequency jump
- 4 phase code pulse compression technology
- Low sidelobe super cosecant squared antenna
- Counter electronic countermeasure and noise suppression capability
- Adaptive MTI filters for noise map and speed map are provided.
- Interference analysis and selected transmission technology
- Other reported names:
  - REL-2 (export, company)
  - Hai Ying

== See also ==
- Type 052 Luhu class destroyer
