= Type 052C destroyer =

Class of guided missile destroyers in the Chinese People's Liberation Army Navy

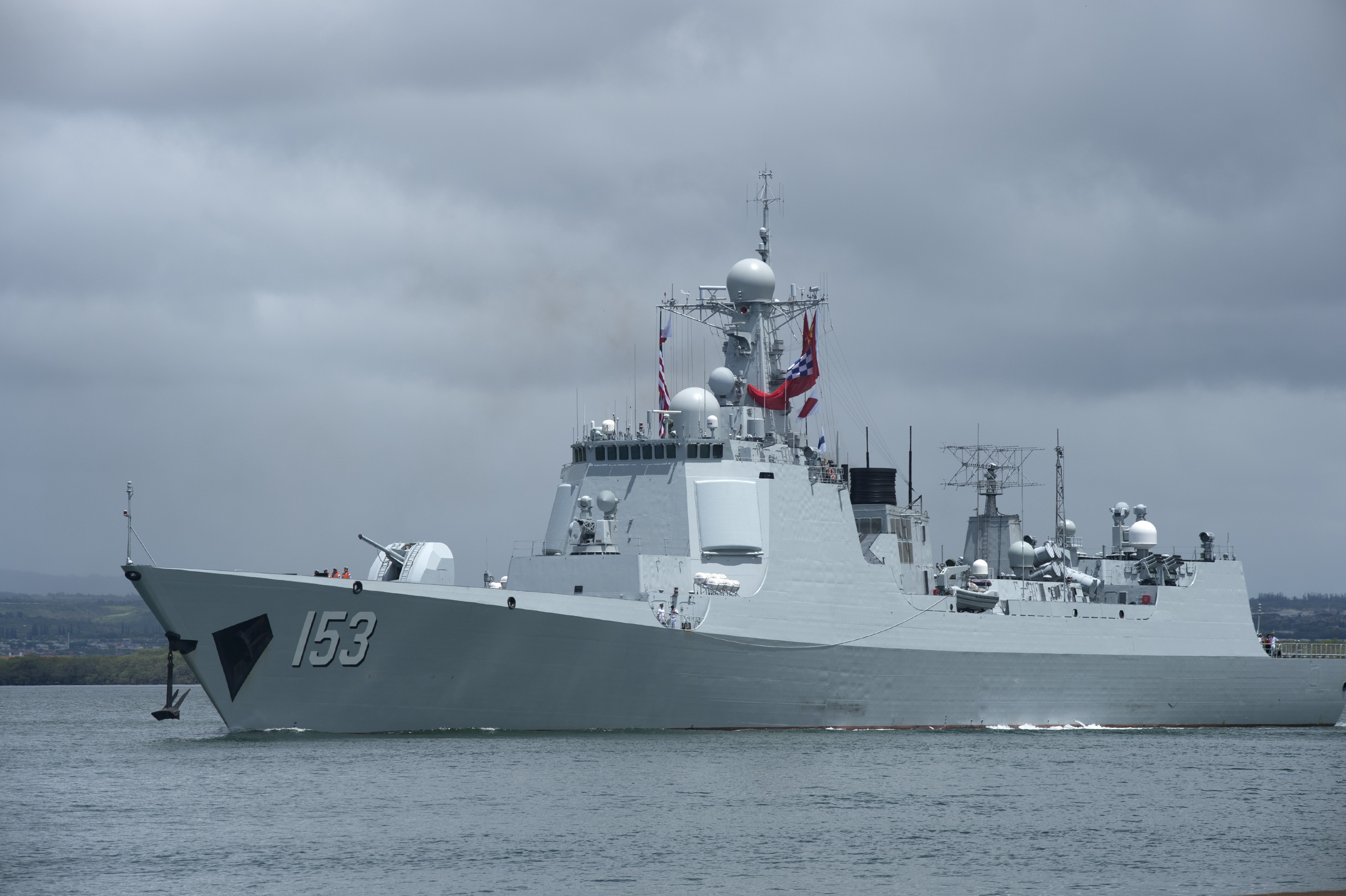
- Xi'an at Pearl Harbor in 2016

Class overview
- Builders: Jiangnan Shipyard
- Operators: PLA Navy Surface Force
- Preceded by: Type 052B destroyer (based on hull family and commissioning date)
- Succeeded by: Type 052D (based on hull family); Type 051C (based on commissioning date)
- Built: 2002–2015
- In service: September 2005–present
- Planned: 6
- Completed: 6
- Active: 6

General characteristics
- Type: Guided-missile destroyer
- Displacement: 7,000 tons
- Length: 155 m (508 ft 6 in)
- Beam: 17 m (55 ft 9 in)
- Draught: 6 m (19 ft 8 in)
- Propulsion: Combined diesel or gas; 2 × DA80 gas turbines (35.7 MW each); 2 × MTU 20V 956TB92 diesels (6 MW each)
- Speed: 29 knots (54 km/h; 33 mph)
- Range: 4,500 nautical miles (8,300 km; 5,200 mi) at 15 knots
- Complement: 280
- Sensors & processing systems: Type 346 radar (air search, fire control); Type 517 radar (air search); Type 364 radar (air and surface search); Type 344 radar (main gun fire control); Type 347G(2) radar (Type 730 fire control); Type 366 radar (YJ-62 fire control); Bow mounted sonar; Towed array sonar
- Electronic warfare & decoys: NRJ-6A; 4x H/RJZ-726-4A Decoy Launchers
- Armament: 48 HHQ-9 surface-to-air missiles; 8 YJ-62 anti-ship cruise missiles; 1 × 100 mm H/PJ-87 gun; 2 × 30mm Type 730 close-in weapons systems; 6 × torpedo tubes
- Aircraft carried: 1 helicopter (Kamov Ka-28 or Harbin Z-9)
- Aviation facilities: Stern hangar; Helicopter landing platform

The Type 052C destroyer (NATO/OSD Luyang II-class destroyer) is a class of guided-missile destroyers in the Chinese People's Liberation Army Navy Surface Force (PLAN). The Type 052C introduced both fixed active electronically scanned array (AESA) radar and vertically launched surface-to-air missiles into PLAN service, making it the first Chinese warship with area air defence capability.

== Program ==
The first two ships, Lanzhou and Haikou, were laid down at the Jiangnan Shipyard in Shanghai in 2002, and entered service in 2004 and 2005 respectively. No further ships were laid down until 2010; the pause may have been due to the relocation of the shipyard. By 2019, six were operational.

== Design ==
The Type 052C appears to share the same basic hull design as the Type 052B destroyer, which in turn is based on the Type 051B destroyer. Stealth features are incorporated.

The Type 052C uses predominantly Chinese systems derived from earlier foreign technology; the preceding Type 052 and Type 052B destroyers used a mixture of Russian and Chinese systems.

=== Missiles ===
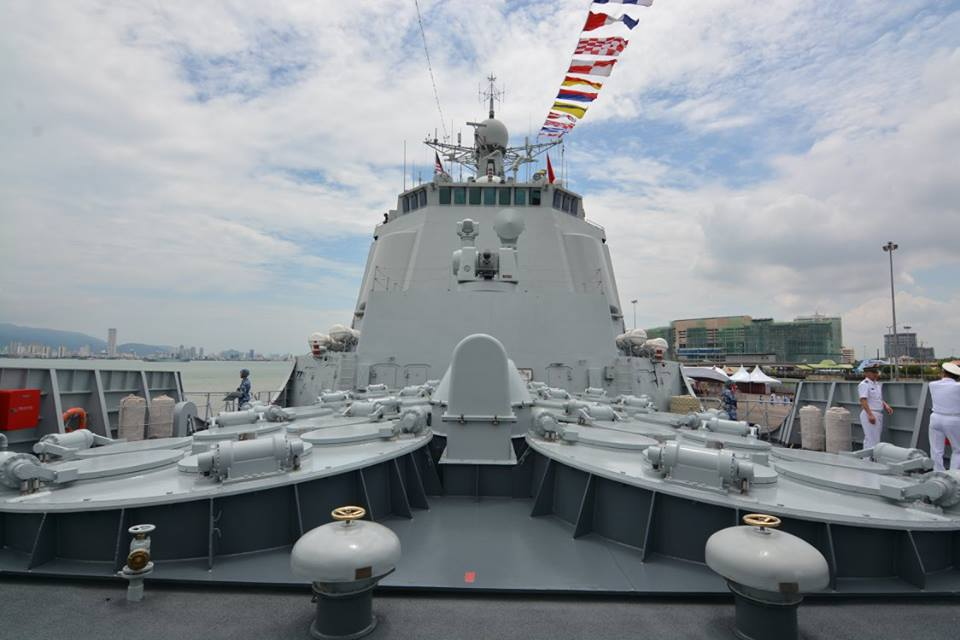
Forward VLS launchers

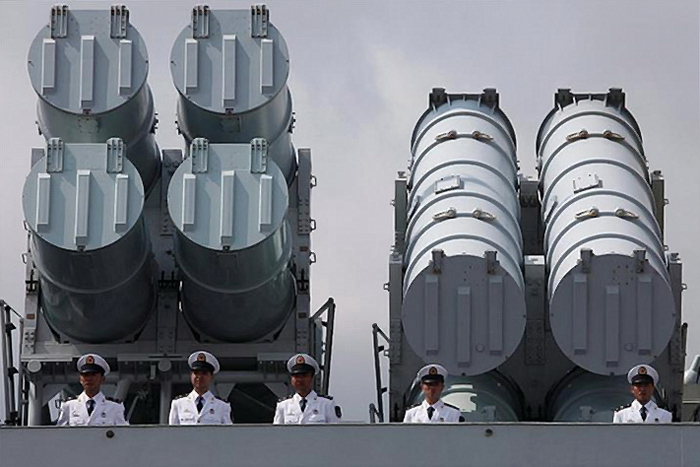
YJ-62 anti-ship missile launchers

The Type 052C carries 48 HHQ-9 naval surface-to-air missiles (SAM), each with a slant range of 110 nautical miles (200 km; 130 mi). The SAMs are cold launched from eight revolver-type vertical launchers, with six missiles per launcher.

Eight YJ-62 anti-ship missiles are carried in two quad-canister launchers just forward of the hangar. Each missile has a range of 250 nautical miles (460 km; 290 mi).

=== Guns ===
The main gun is a 100 mm (4 in) PJ-87. The gun suffered from jamming and may have influenced the decision to adopt a different weapon for the Type 052D destroyer. The weapon has a rate of fire of 25 rounds per minute.

Close-in defence is provided by two seven-barrel 30 mm (1.2 in) Type 730 CIWS, one mounted forward of the bridge and one atop the hangar. Each gun has a maximum rate of fire of 4200 rounds per minute.

=== Anti-submarine systems ===
Two triple 324 mm (13 in) torpedo tubes are carried; these are copies or derivatives of the Whitehead Alenia Sistemi Subacquei B515/ILAS-3. This launcher may fire the Yu-7 ASW torpedo.

=== Radar ===
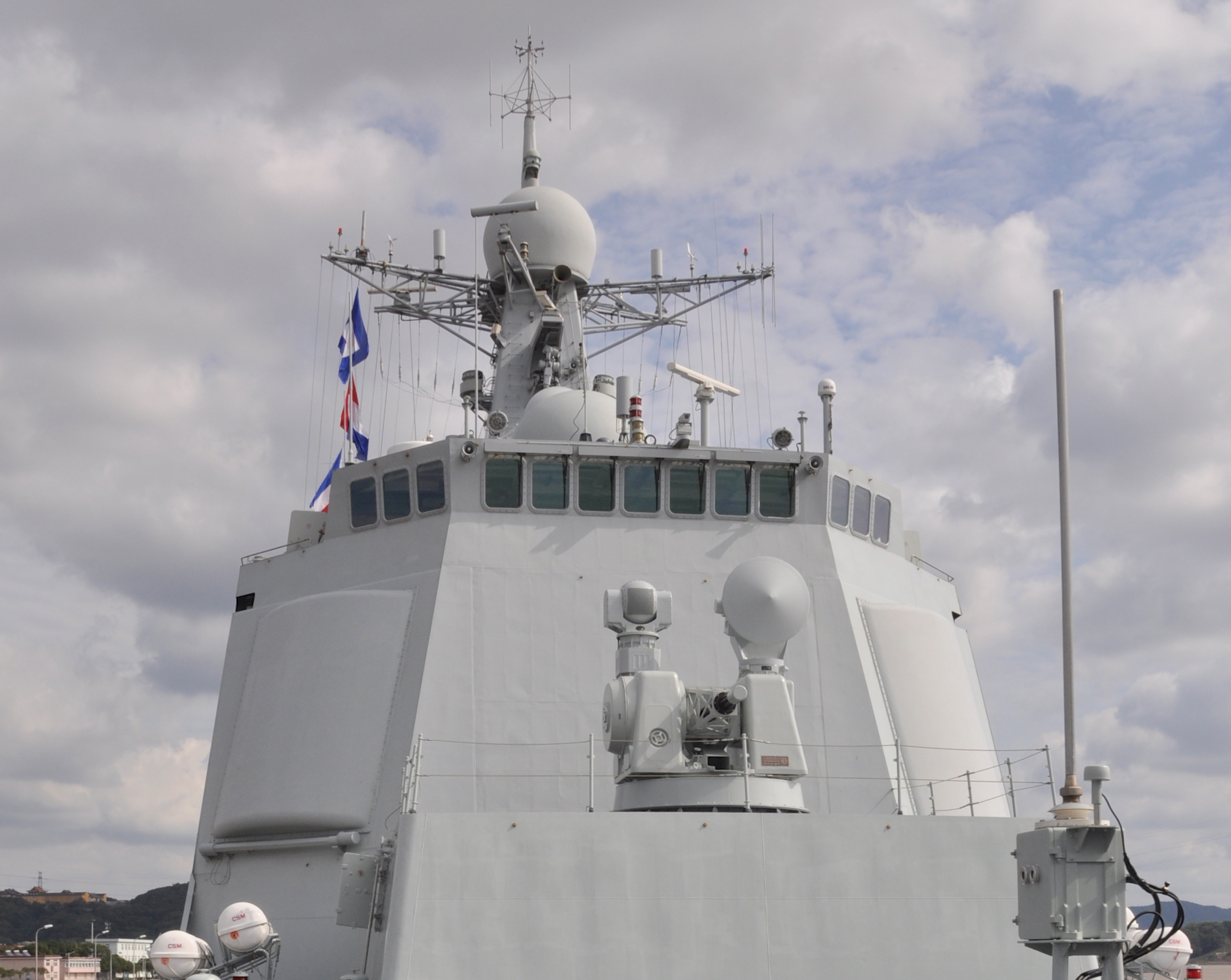
Forward Type 346 radar panels and Type 730 CIWS

The Type 052C is the first PLAN warship to mount the G-band Type 346 AESA radar. The four phased array antennas are mounted on the taller forward superstructure. The Type 346 is used for air search, and provides fire control for the HHQ-9. The combination of AESA radar and VLS SAMs produces a marked increase in anti-aircraft firepower over previous Chinese warships.

=== Aircraft ===
A Kamov Ka-28 or Harbin Z-9 helicopter may operate from the rear hangar and flight deck. The Ka-28 is equipped with a search radar and dipping sonar and can also employ sonobuoys, torpedoes, depth charges, or mines. The Z-9 is a variant of the Airbus Helicopters AS365 Dauphin. The naval variant of the Z-9, the Z-9C, is equipped with the KLC-1 search radar, dipping sonar, and is typically armed with a single, lightweight torpedo. Either helicopter significantly improves the anti-submarine capabilities of the Type 052C.

=== Propulsion ===
The Type 052C propulsion is in the combined diesel or gas (CODOG) arrangement, with two Ukrainian DA80 gas turbines and two MTU 20V 956TB92 diesel engines.

The DA80s had blade problems and may have contributed to the last two Type 052Cs sitting pierside at the shipyard for two years without being accepted by the PLAN.

The MTU 20V 956TB92 engines were license-produced by Shaanxi Diesel Engine Works.

== Ships of class ==
Hull no.	Name	Builder	Launched	Commissioned	Fleet	Status
170	兰州 / Lanzhou	Jiangnan Shipyard, Shanghai	29 April 2003	18 July 2004	South Sea Fleet	Active
171	海口 / Haikou	Jiangnan Shipyard, Shanghai	30 October 2003	20 July 2005	South Sea Fleet	Active
150	长春 / Changchun	Jiangnan Shipyard, Changxingdao	28 November 2010	31 January 2013	East Sea Fleet	Active
151	郑州 / Zhengzhou	Jiangnan Shipyard, Changxingdao	20 July 2011	26 December 2013	East Sea Fleet	Active
152	济南 / Jinan	Jiangnan Shipyard, Changxingdao	18 October 2011	22 December 2014	East Sea Fleet	Active
153	西安 / Xi'an	Jiangnan Shipyard, Changxingdao	28 May 2012	9 February 2015	East Sea Fleet	Active

== Gallery ==
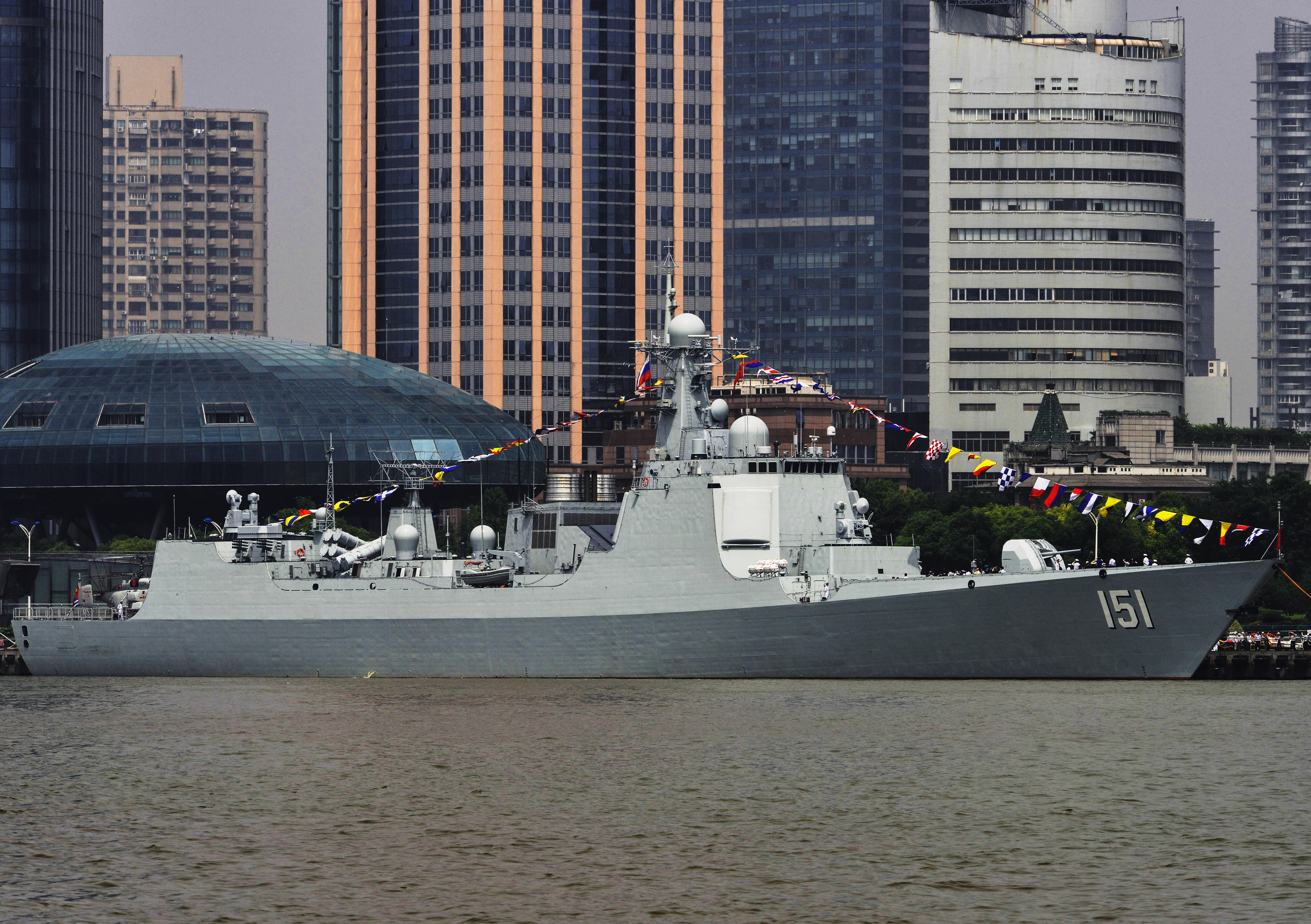
Type 052C Zhengzhou (151)

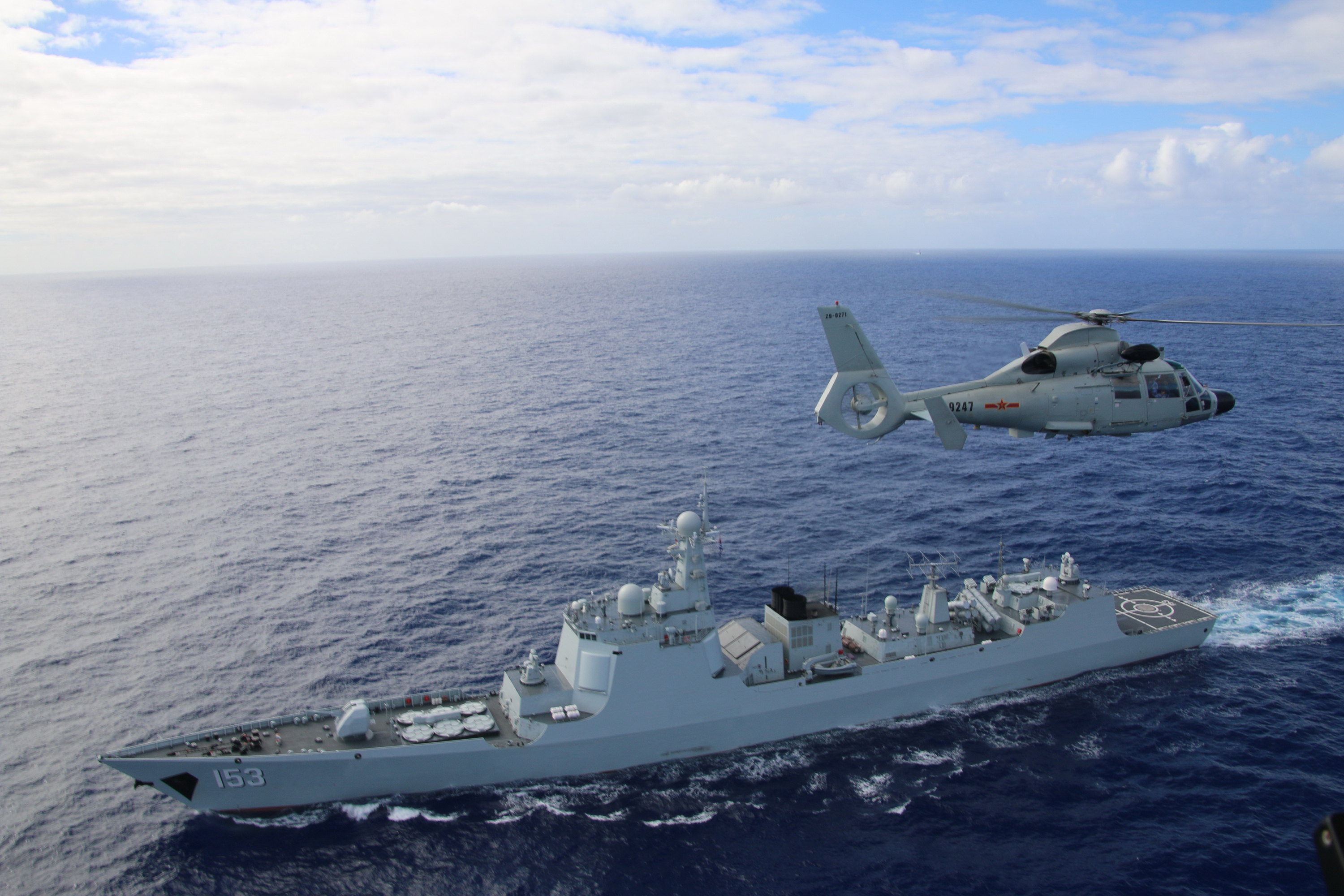
Xi'an (153) and Z-9 at RIMPAC 2016

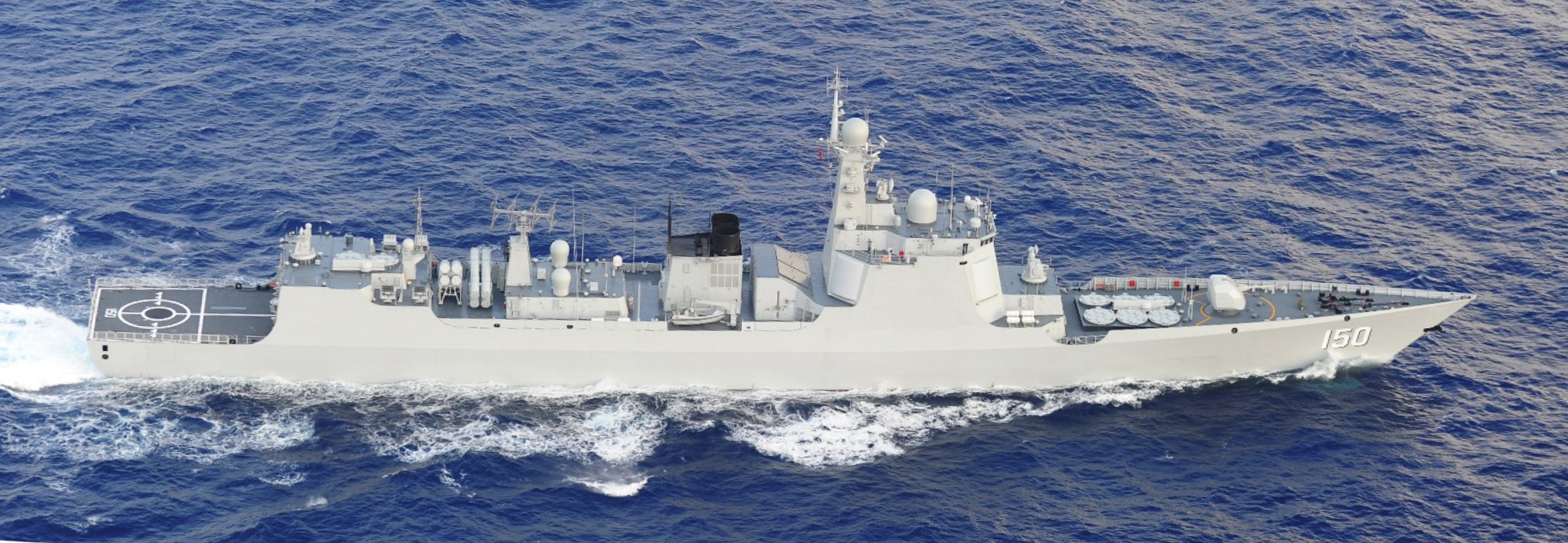
Changchun (150) in the East China Sea

== See also ==
- List of destroyer classes in service

Equivalent destroyers of the same era

- Atago class
- Sejong the Great class (Batch I)
- Type 45 destroyer
- Horizon class

== Bibliography ==
- Li, Nan (July 2017). "Why Is the Surface Fleet Gaining Importance?". CSMI Red Book. 14. United States Naval War College: 43–54. ISBN 978-1-935352-45-7.
- McDevitt, Michael (July 2017). "The Modern PLA Navy Destroyer Force". CSMI Red Book. 14. United States Naval War College: 55–65. ISBN 978-1-935352-45-7.
- United States Navy Office of Naval Intelligence (2015). The PLA Navy: New Capabilities and Missions for the 21st Century (PDF) (Report).
