= Chinese destroyer Changchun (150) =

Type 025C destroyer of the PLA Navy

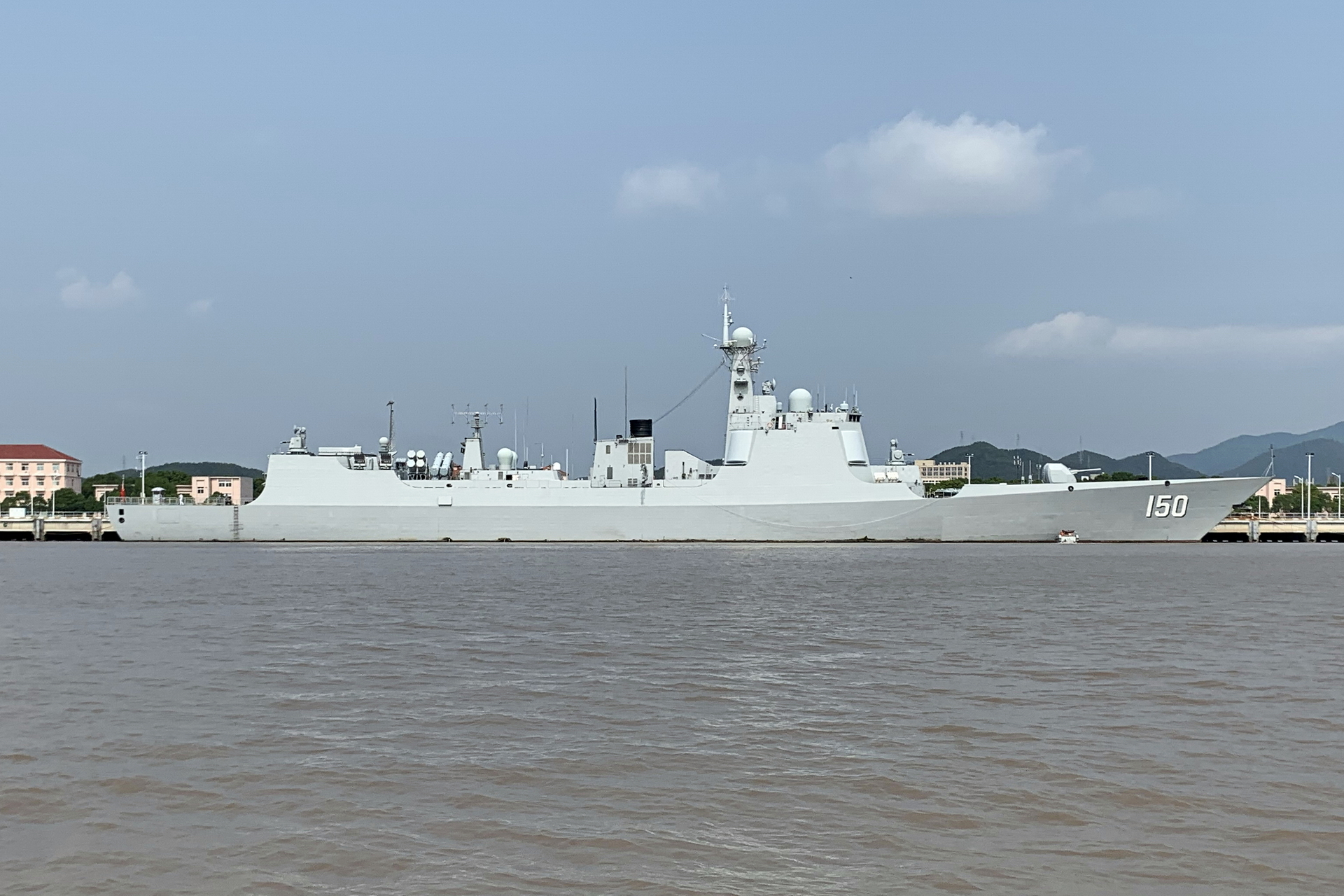
- Changchun on 6 October 2019

History

China
- Name: Changchun
- Namesake: Changchun; (长春)
- Builder: Jiangnan Shipyard, Shanghai
- Launched: 28 October 2010
- Commissioned: 31 January 2013
- Home port: Zhoushan
- Identification: Pennant number: 150
- Status: Active

General characteristics
- Class & type: Type 052C destroyer
- Displacement: 7,000 tons
- Length: 155 m (508 ft 6 in)
- Beam: 17 m (55 ft 9 in)
- Draught: 6 m (19 ft 8 in)
- Propulsion: Combined diesel or gas; 2 x DA80 gas turbines (35.7 MW each); 2 x MTU 20V 956TB92 diesels (6 MW each)
- Speed: 29 knots (54 km/h; 33 mph)
- Range: 4,500 nautical miles (8,300 km; 5,200 mi) at 15 knots
- Complement: 280
- Sensors & processing systems: Type 346 radar (air search, fire control); Type 517 radar (air search); Type 364 radar (air and surface search); Type 344 radar (main gun fire control); Type 347G(2) radar (Type 730 fire control); Type 366 radar (YJ-62 fire control); Bow mounted sonar
- Electronic warfare & decoys: NRJ-6A
- Armament: 48 HHQ-9 surface-to-air missiles; 8 YJ-62 anti-ship cruise missiles; 1 × 100 mm PJ-87 gun; 2 × 30 mm Type 730 close-in weapons systems; 6 x torpedo tubes; 4 x multiple rocket launchers (possibly multirole)
- Aircraft carried: 1 helicopter: Kamov Ka-28 or Harbin Z-9
- Aviation facilities: Hangar and helipad

Changchun (150) is a Type 052C destroyer of the People's Liberation Army Navy. She was commissioned on 31 January 2013.

== Development and design ==
The Type 052C appears to share the same basic hull design as the Type 052B destroyer, which in turn is based on the Type 051B destroyer. Stealth features are incorporated. They uses predominantly Chinese systems derived from earlier foreign technology; the preceding Type 052 and Type 052B destroyers used a mixture of Russian and Chinese systems.

The Type 052C propulsion is in the combined diesel or gas (CODOG) arrangement, with two Ukrainian DA80 gas turbines and two MTU 20V 956TB92 diesel engines. The DA80s had blade problems and may have contributed to the last two Type 052Cs sitting pierside at the shipyard for two years without being accepted by the PLAN.

A Kamov Ka-28 or Harbin Z-9 helicopter may operate from the rear hangar and flight deck. The Ka-28 is equipped with a search radar and dipping sonar and can also employ sonobuoys, torpedoes, depth charges, or mines. The Z-9 is a variant of the Airbus Helicopters AS365 Dauphin. The naval variant of the Z-9, the Z-9C, is equipped with the KLC-1 search radar, dipping sonar, and is typically armed with a single, lightweight torpedo. Either helicopter significantly improves the anti-submarine capabilities of the Type 052C.

The main gun is a 100 mm (4 in) PJ-87. The gun suffered from jamming and may have influenced the decision to adopt a different weapon for the Type 052D destroyer. The weapon has a rate of fire of 25 rounds per minute. Close-in defence is provided by two seven-barrel 30 mm (1.2 in) Type 730 CIWS, one mounted forward of the bridge and one atop the hangar. Each gun has a maximum rate of fire of 4200 rounds per minute.

== Construction and career ==
Changchun was launched on 28 October 2010 at the Jiangnan Shipyard in Shanghai. She was commissioned on 31 January 2013.

On September 25, 2013, Changchun and others carried out a joint anti-submarine exercise organized by the East China Sea Fleet in the South China Sea. During the exercise, the Changchun first discovered the so-called enemy submarine, and synchronized the battlefield situation and target elements with the formation ships through the integrated command platform, and mobilized multiple anti-submarine platforms to successfully attack the submarine.

On February 28, 2014, Changchun, Yiyang, and Changzhou formed the East China Sea Fleet's open sea training fleet and set sail from a military port in Zhoushan. On March 7, Changchun and others crossed the Bashi Channel and entered the Western Pacific for high-intensity testing training. On March 8, 2014, Malaysia Airlines Flight 370 crashed. On March 24, Changchun, Changzhou, Chaohu formed the 17th Chinese navy escort fleet, which was ready 10 days earlier than the scheduled time. From Zhoushan, they set sail ahead of schedule and went to the Indian Ocean to perform search and rescue missions via the South China Sea, Natuna Islands, Karimata Strait, and Sunda Strait. On April 5, 2014, Changchun and others completed the search mission in the area of responsibility of 111.1 thousand square kilometers south of Christmas Island, Australia, and went to the Gulf of Aden and the waters of Somalia to take over the escort mission of the sixteenth batch of escort teams. The escort lasted 213 days and nights. The formation completed a total of 43 batches of 115 Chinese and foreign ships escorting missions, and then conducted friendly visits to Jordan, UAE, Iran, and Pakistan. Changchun would return to the military port in Zhoushan City, Zhejiang Province on October 22.

In June 2017, Changchun and Jingzhou and a destroyer from Iran held a military exercise in the Strait of Hormuz.

== Gallery ==
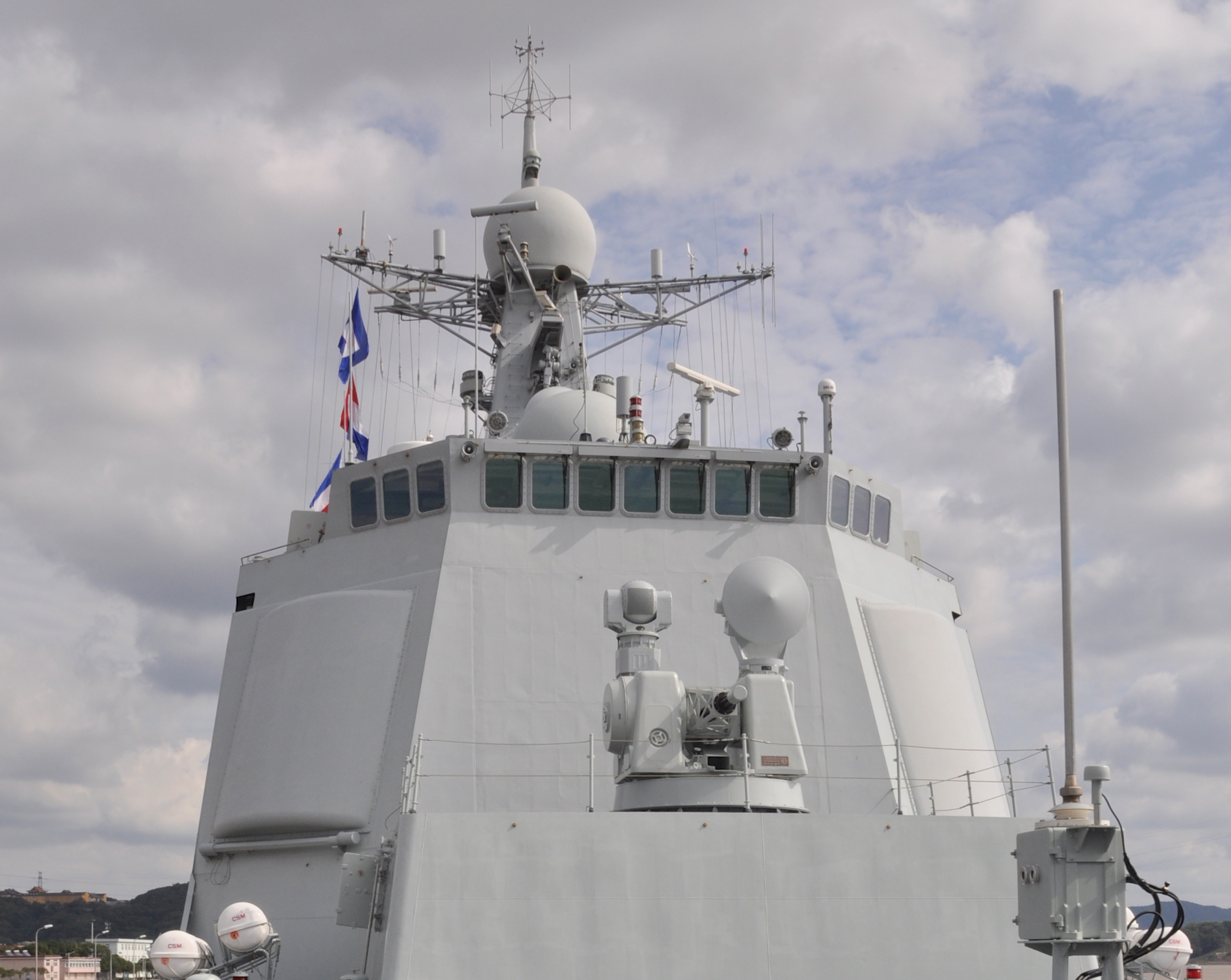
Changchun on 13 November 2013.

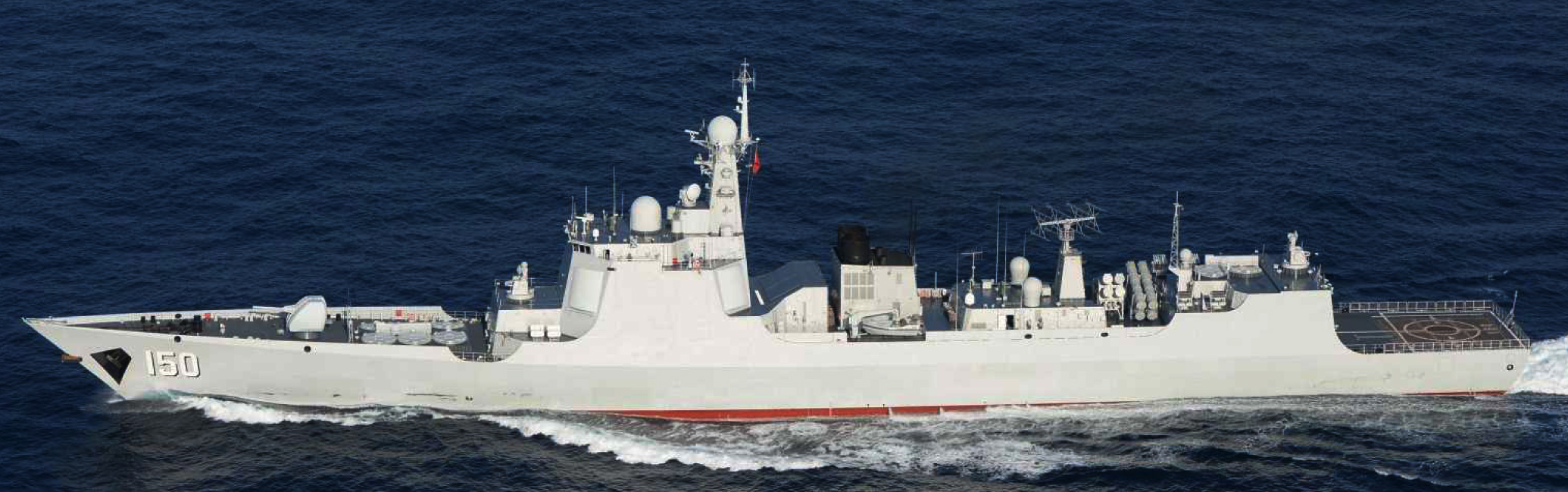
Changchun underway on 18 July 2015.

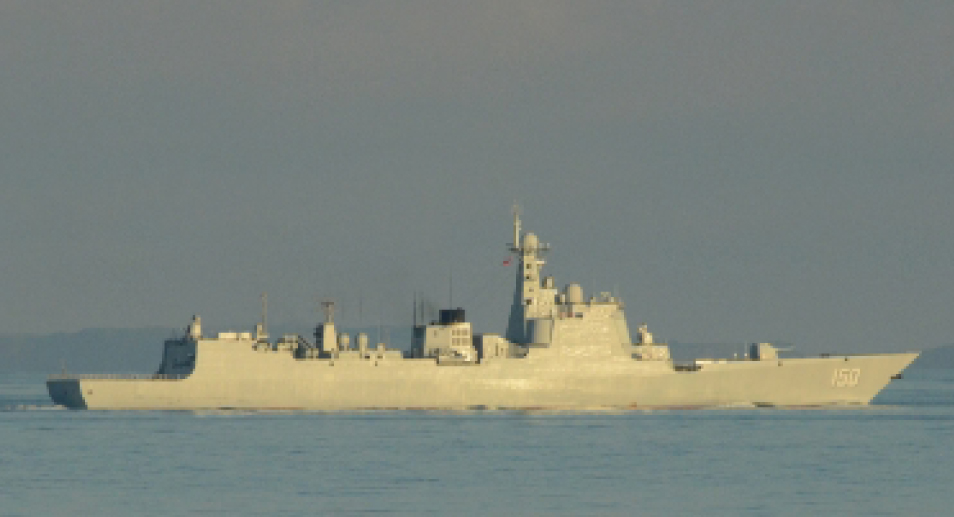
Changchun underway on 1 August 2015.

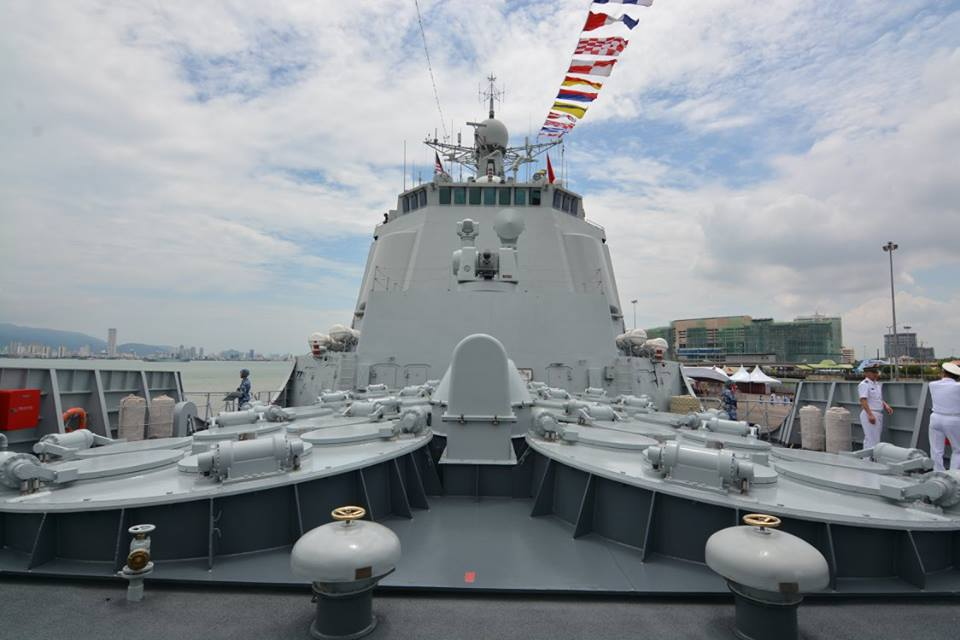
Changchun at Penang Strait on 12 May 2017.

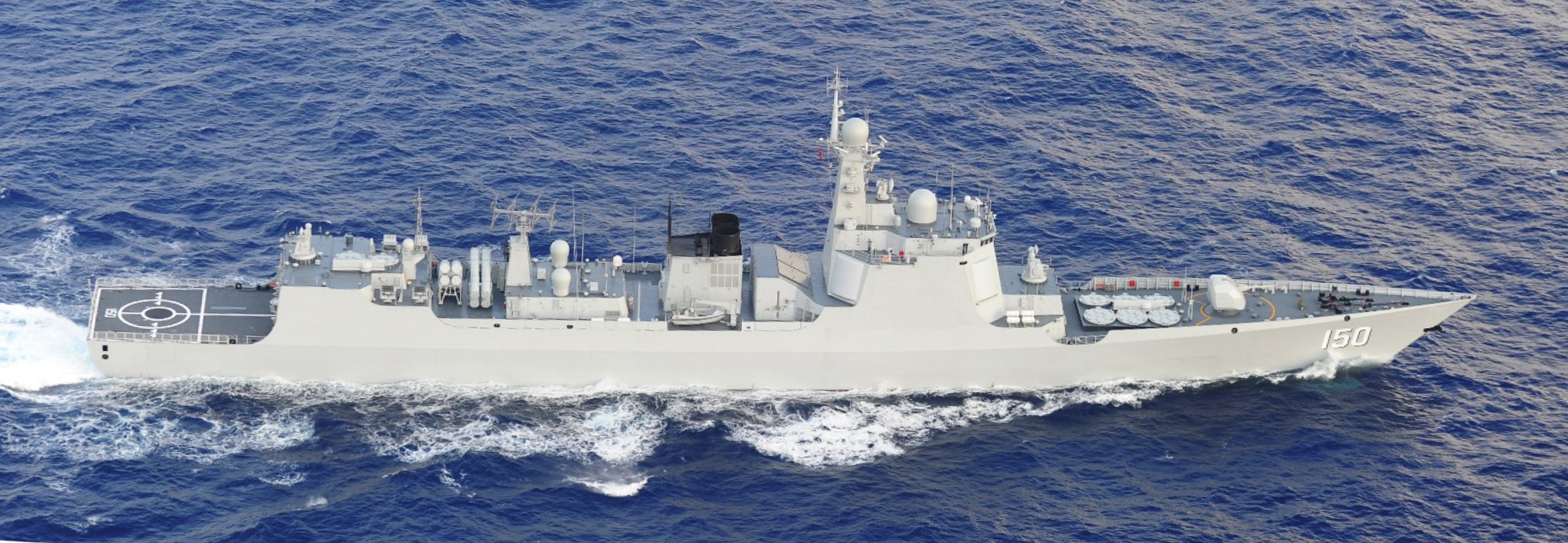
Changchun underway on 20 April 2018.
