= Chinese destroyer Guangzhou (168) =

Type 052B destroyer of the PLA Navy

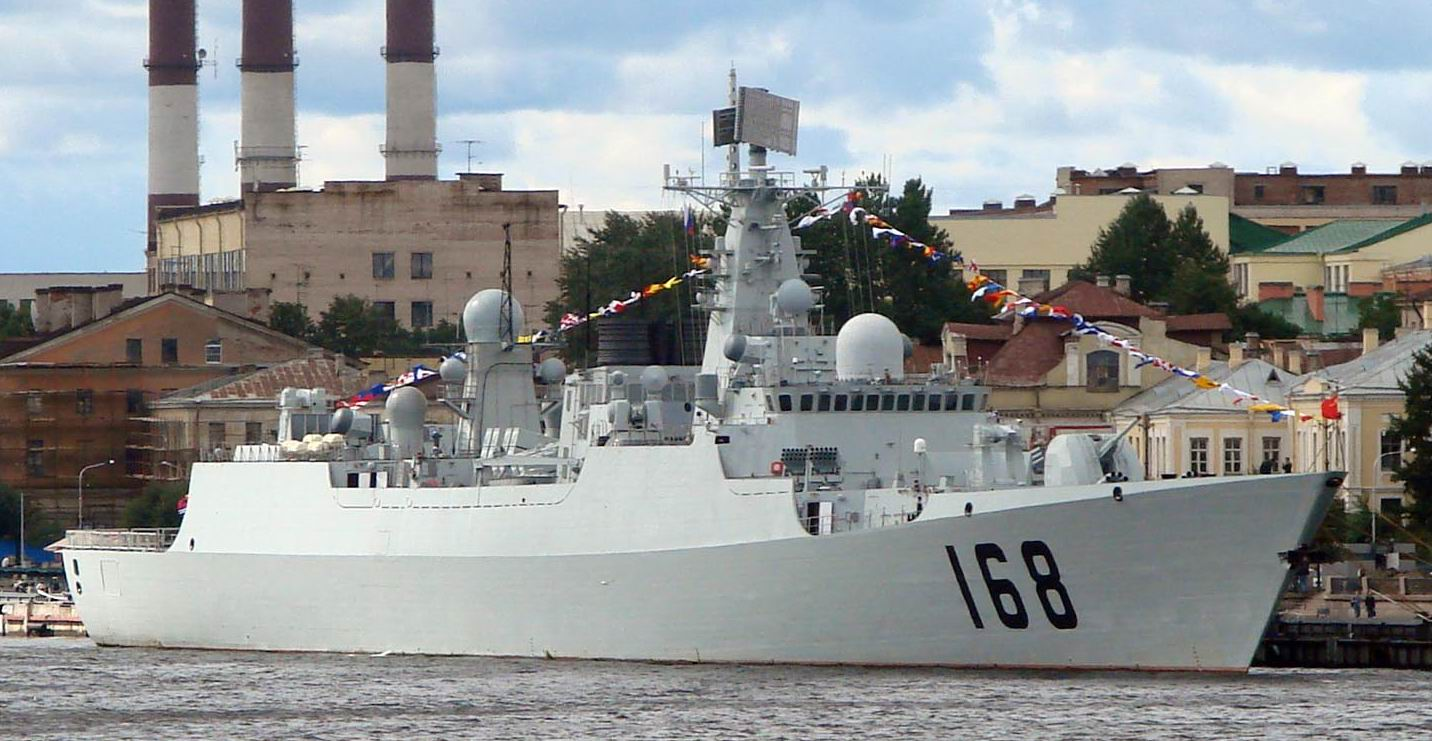
- Guangzhou on 27 August 2007 (appearance before the modernization)

History

China
- Name: Guangzhou
- Namesake: Guangzhou; (广州)
- Builder: Jiangnan Shipyard, Shanghai
- Laid down: February 2000
- Launched: 20 May 2002
- Commissioned: 15 July 2004
- Home port: Zhanjiang
- Identification: Pennant number: 168
- Status: Active
- Badge: See #Emblem

General characteristics
- Class & type: Type 052B destroyer
- Displacement: 5,850 tons standard; 6,500 tons full load
- Length: 155 m (509 ft)
- Beam: 17.2 m (56 ft)
- Draught: 6 m (20 ft)
- Propulsion: Combined diesel or gas; 57,000 shp
- Speed: 30 kn (56 km/h; 35 mph)
- Complement: 280
- Sensors & processing systems: Fregat-MAE-5 (Top Plate) 3D air search phased array radar; MR90 Front-Dome fire control radar; Mineral-ME (Band Stand) over-the-horizon targeting radar; Type 344 fire-control radar
- Armament: 16 YJ-83 anti-ship missiles; 48 SA-N-12 Grizzly surface-to-air missiles; 1× Type 210 100 mm dual purpose gun; 2 Type 730 CIWS; 2x Type 75 twelve-barrel 240mm antisubmarine rocket launchers; 2x triple 324mm Yu-7 (Mk-46 Mod 1) antisubmarine torpedo tubes
- Aircraft carried: 1 helicopter: Kamov Ka-28
- Aviation facilities: Hangar and helipad

Guangzhou (168) is the lead ship of Type 052B destroyer of the People's Liberation Army Navy. She was commissioned on 15 July 2004.

== Development and design ==
Type 052B multirole missile destroyer was the first Chinese-built warship capable of area air defence. The displacement of the Type 052B is about 5850 tons standard and 6500 tons full load. The ship features a "low point" design and combines this with radar absorbing paint to reduce radar signature. The ship's funnel incorporates cooling devices to reduce infrared signatures. The stern flight deck can host a Kamov Ka-28 ASW helicopter.

== Construction and career ==
Guangzhou was launched on 20 May 2002 at the Jiangnan Shipyard in Shanghai. She was commissioned on 15 July 2004.

On March 5, 2009, Guangzhou arrived in Karachi, Pakistan with Chinese naval special forces, and joined the navies from 12 countries including the United States, Britain, France, Australia, Japan, Pakistan, Bangladesh, Malaysia, Kuwait, Nigeria and Turkey. They participated in the Peace 2009 multi-country maritime joint military exercise. The exercise includes two parts: a port and shore special forces exercise and a maritime military exercise. The exercise lasts for 8 days. After the exercise, Guangzhou set sail back home on March 14, and arrived at a military port in Sanya, Hainan Province on March 26. On August 16, 2009, Guangzhou arrived at Bitong Port in Manado, Indonesia, and began a four-day goodwill visit. During the period, Guangzhou and 28 naval ships from 14 countries participated in the international fleet inspection to celebrate the 64th anniversary of Indonesian independence. On August 10, Guangzhou arrived at the port of Muara, Brunei, and began a four-day friendly visit. After ending the visit to the two countries, Guangzhou returned to its station on August 24.

On March 4, 2010, Guangzhou and Weishanhu formed the fifth escort fleet of the People's Liberation Army Navy. They set sail from a military port terminal in Sanya City, Hainan Province, and went to the Gulf of Aden and the waters of Somalia to replace the fourth escort fleet. Perform escort missions. The escort mission lasted 192 days and nights, with a voyage of 92,495 nautical miles. Guangzhou successively verified 85 batches of 370 ships driven away from suspicious ships, and accompanied 41 batches of 588 Chinese and foreign merchant ships. After the escort was over, Guangzhou and Chaohu, which arrived in advance and performed the escort mission, also visited Egypt, Italy, Greece, Myanmar and other four countries, and docked in Singapore. On September 11, 2010, Guangzhou's fleet returned to the station.

== Emblem ==
The Emblem of Guangzhou features the characters "海军广州舰" at the top, a sword and anchor in the middle (with a wreath around them), and the Statue of Five Rams, a landmark of the namesake city of Guangzhou, along with the English words "Chinese navy destroyer Guangzhou".

Emblem of the Guangzhou
- https://web.archive.org/web/20250222074524im_/https://gfjy.ahnews.com.cn/gfsp/pic/2023-04/24/824304_e75443da-a414-4cd5-9dbb-9ed43748e129.png

== Gallery ==
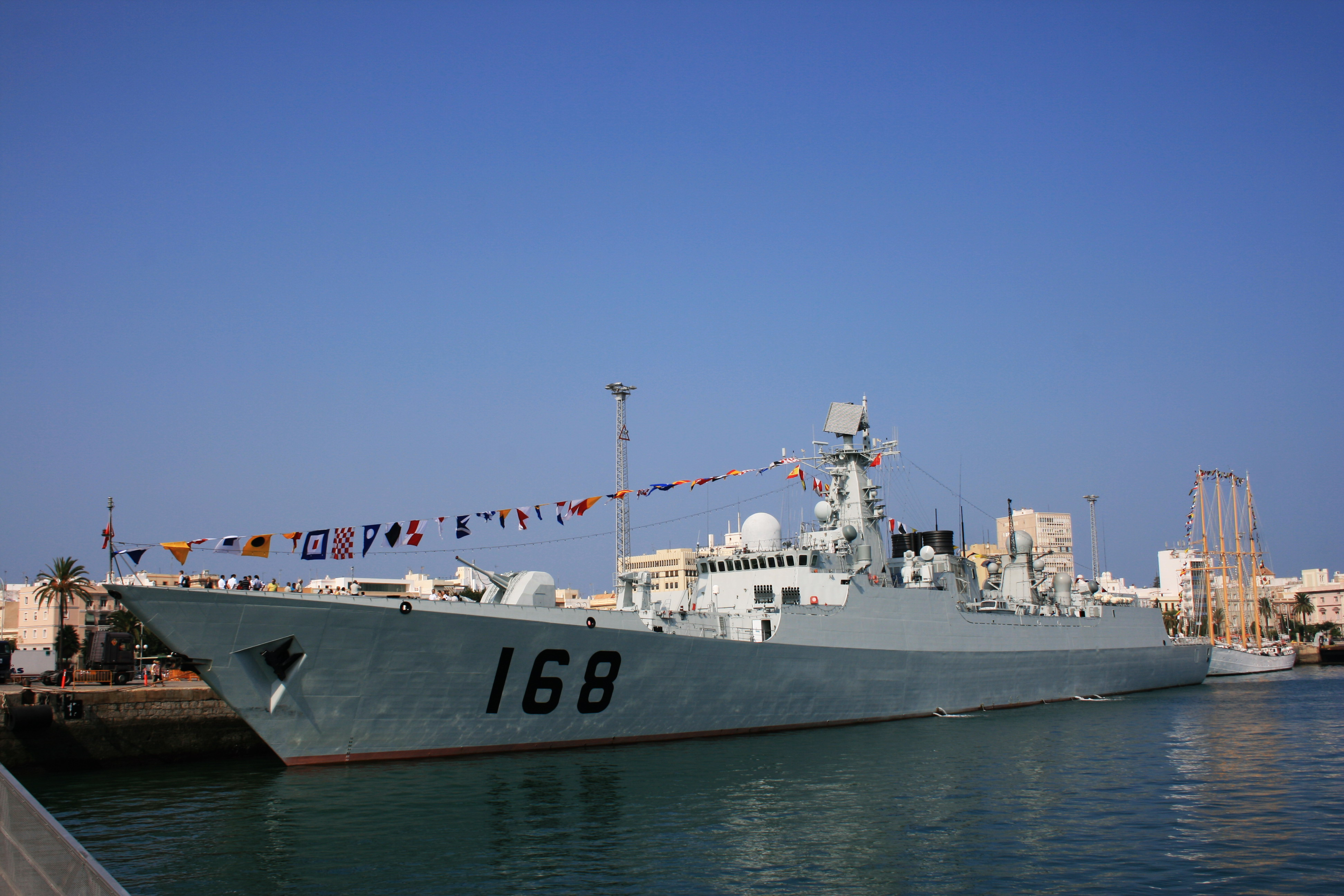
Guangzhou moored on 15 September 2007.

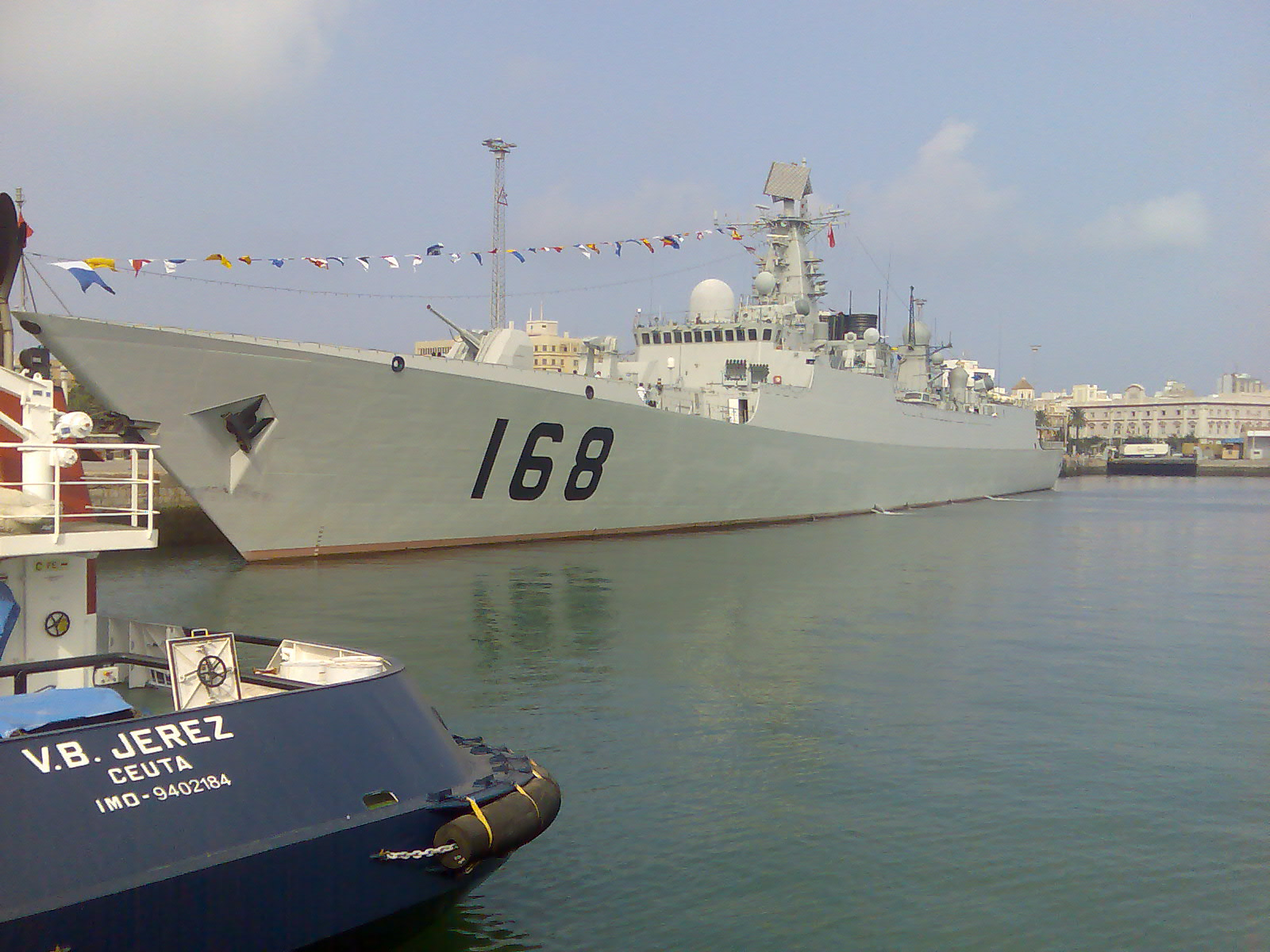
Guangzhou moored on 16 September 2007.

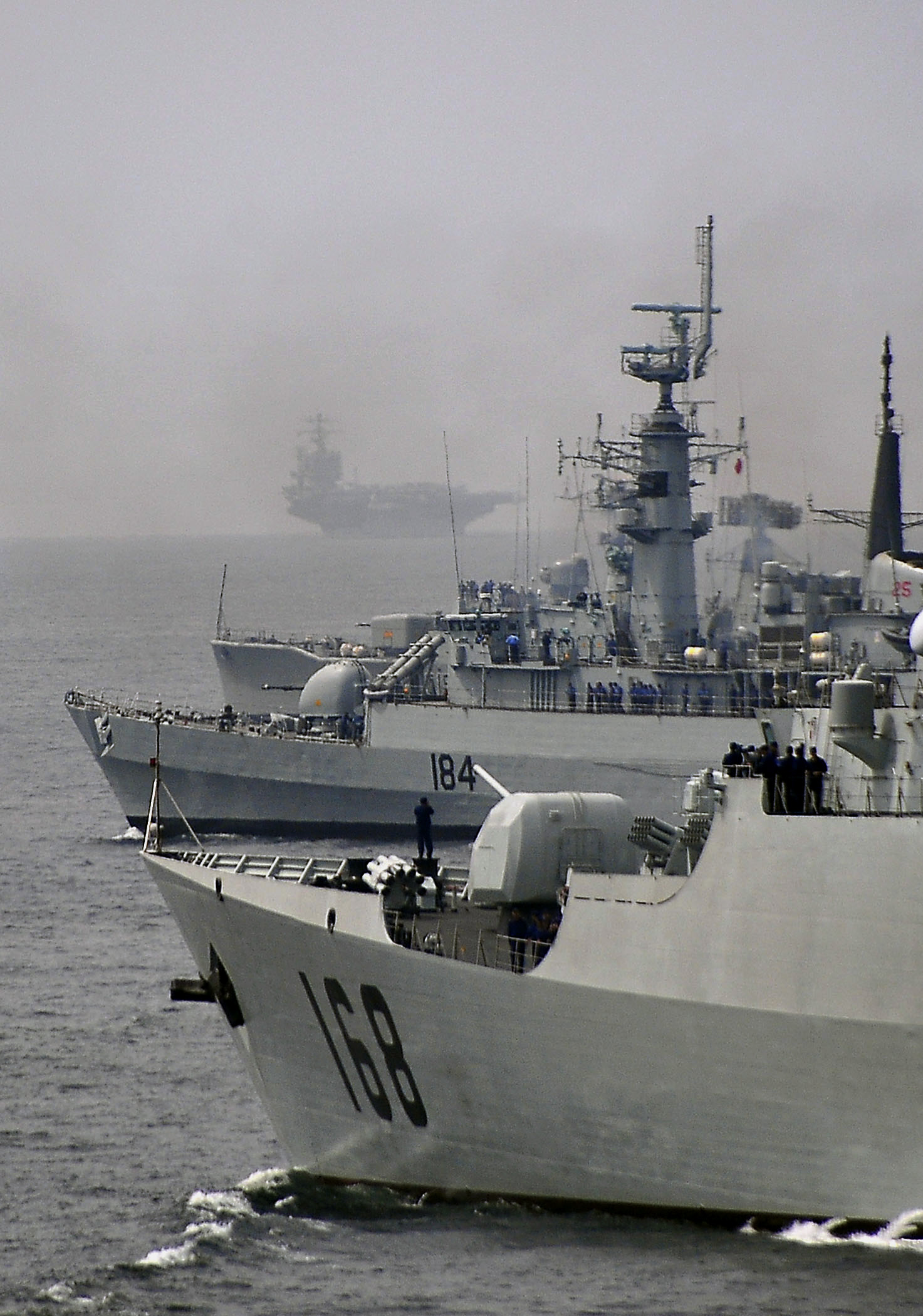
Guangzhou underway in an exercise on 11 March 2009.

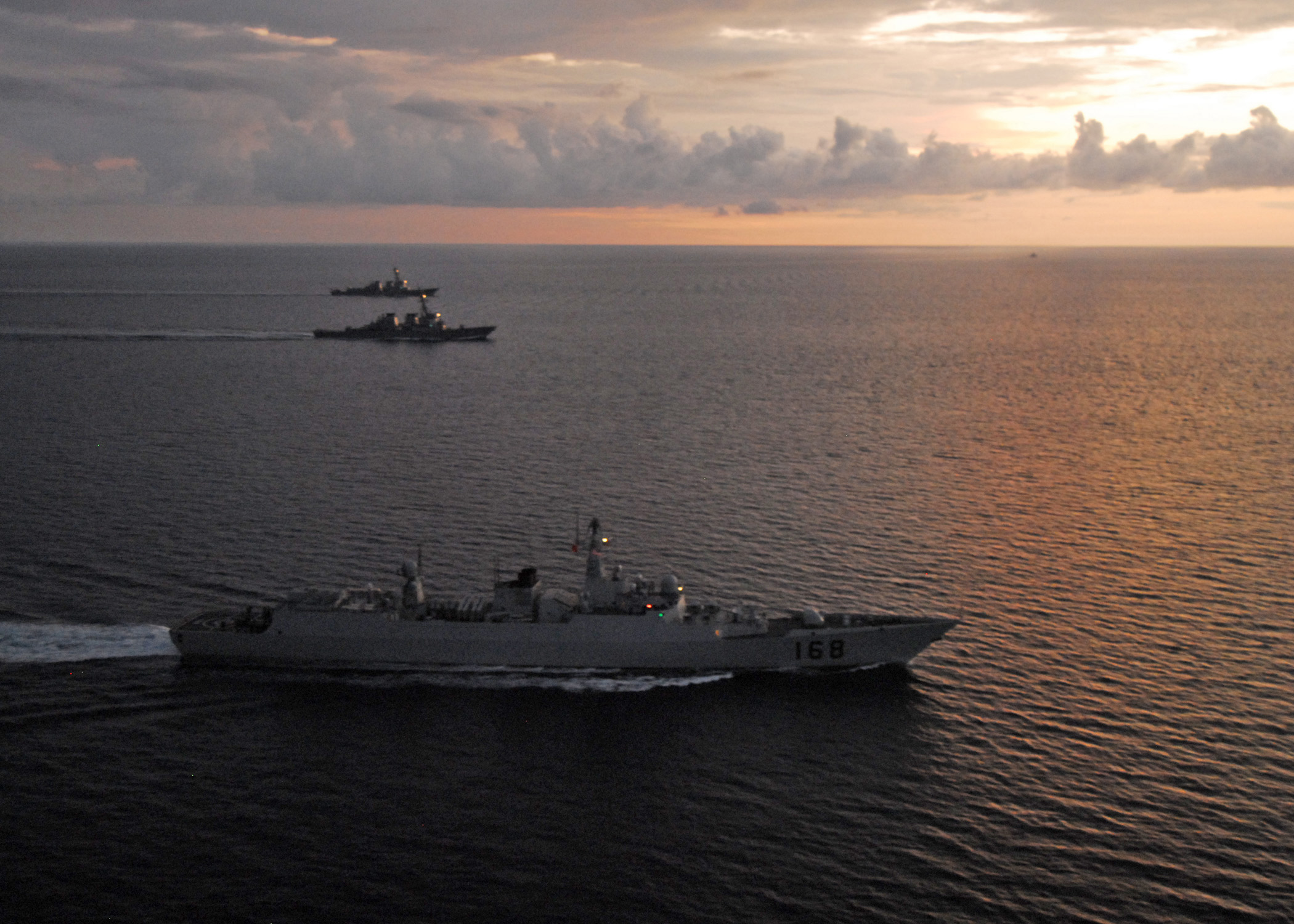
Guangzhou, USS McCampbell and USS Fitzgerald underway on 19 August 2009.

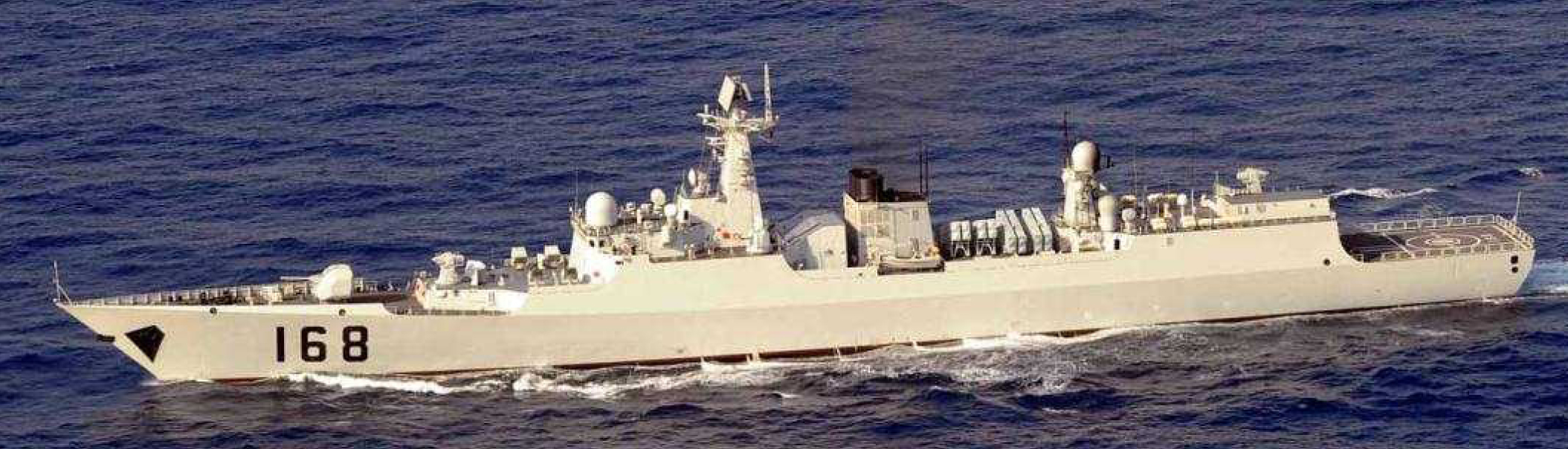
Guangzhou underway on 8 May 2012.

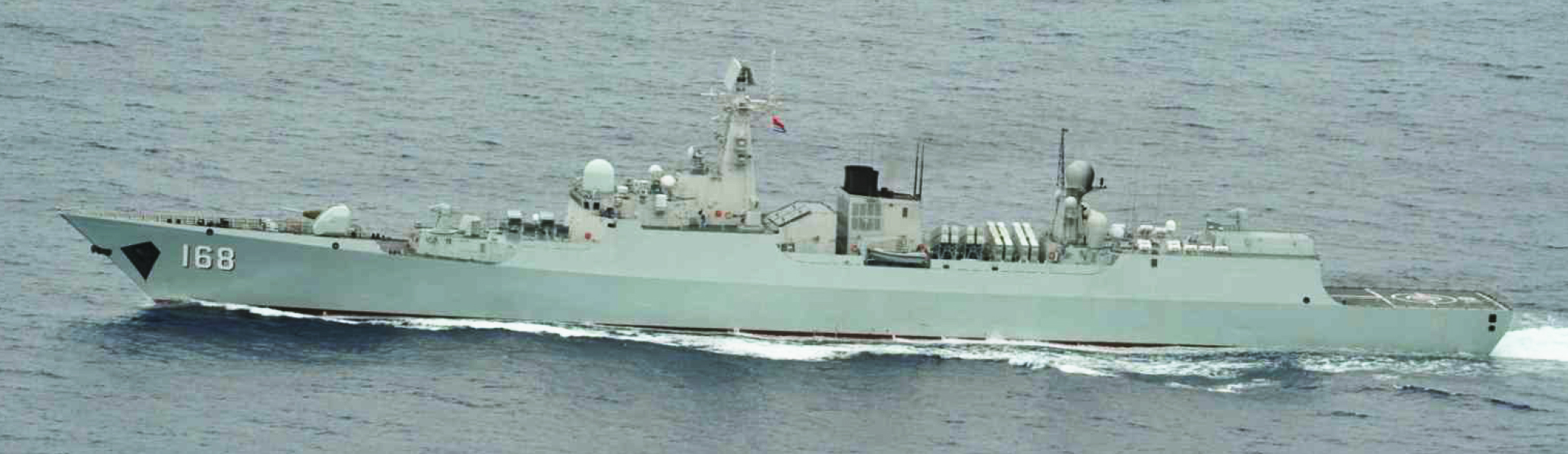
Guangzhou underway on 25 May 2016.
