= Chinese destroyer Wuhan =

Type 052B destroyer of the PLA Navy

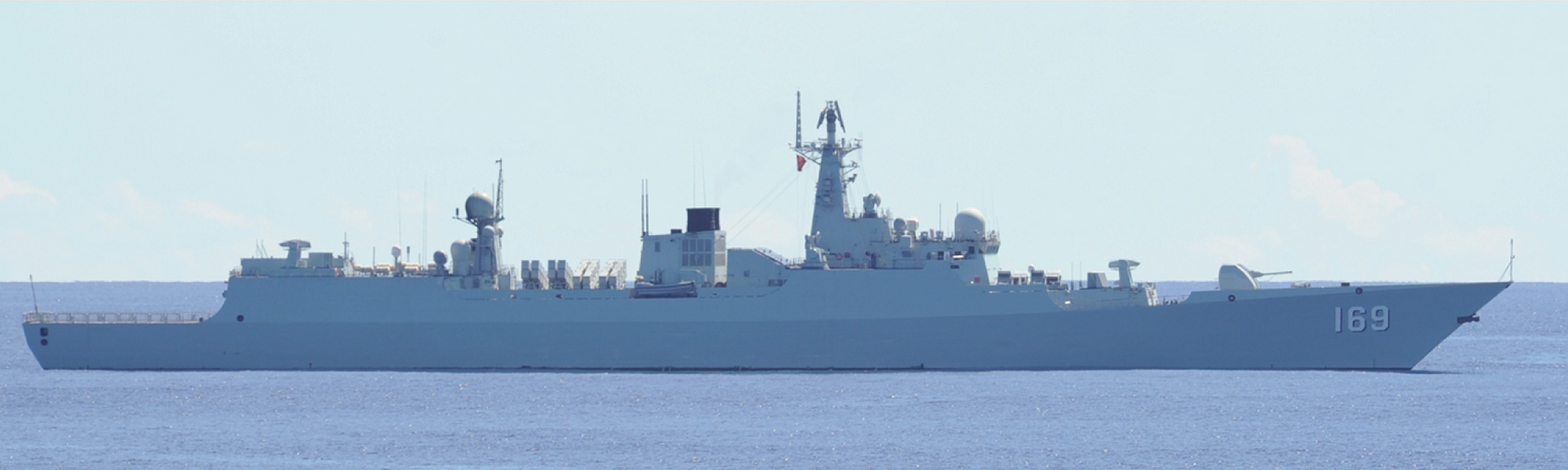
- Wuhan underway on 10 June 2015 (appearance before the modernization)

History

China
- Name: Wuhan
- Namesake: Wuhan; (武汉)
- Builder: Jiangnan Shipyard, Shanghai
- Laid down: 2000
- Launched: October 2002
- Commissioned: December 2004
- Home port: Zhanjiang
- Identification: Pennant number: 169
- Status: Active

General characteristics
- Class & type: Type 052B destroyer
- Displacement: 5,850 tons standard; 6,500 tons full load
- Length: 155 m (509 ft)
- Beam: 17.2 m (56 ft)
- Draught: 6 m (20 ft)
- Propulsion: Combined diesel or gas; 57,000 shp
- Speed: 30 kn (56 km/h; 35 mph)
- Complement: 280
- Sensors & processing systems: Fregat-MAE-5 (Top Plate) 3D air search phased array radar; MR90 Front-Dome fire control radar; Mineral-ME (Band Stand) over-the-horizon targeting radar; Type 344 fire-control radar
- Armament: 16 YJ-83 anti-ship missiles; 48 SA-N-12 Grizzly surface-to-air missiles; 1× Type 210 100 mm dual-purpose gun; 2 Type 730 CIWS; 2x Type 75 twelve-barrel 240mm antisubmarine rocket launchers; 2x triple 324mm Yu-7 (Mk-46 Mod 1) antisubmarine torpedo tubes
- Aircraft carried: 1 helicopter: Kamov Ka-28
- Aviation facilities: Hangar and helipad

Wuhan (169) is the second ship of Type 052B destroyer of the People's Liberation Army Navy. She was commissioned in December 2004.

== Development and design ==
Type 052B multirole missile destroyer was the first Chinese-built warship capable of area air defence. The displacement of the Type 052B is about 5850 tons standard and 6500 tons full load. The ship features a "low point" design and combines this with radar absorbing paint to reduce radar signature. The ship's funnel incorporates cooling devices to reduce infrared signatures. The stern flight deck can host a Kamov Ka-28 ASW helicopter.

== Construction and career ==
Wuhan was launched in February 2002 at the Jiangnan Shipyard in Shanghai. She was commissioned in December 2004.

On April 2, 2008, the commander of the U.S. Marine Corps, General James Conway, accompanied by Major General Zhang Leiyu, Deputy Chief of Naval Staff of the People's Liberation Army, began a two-day visit to the South China Sea Fleet. During the visit, Wuhan and Luo Xiaoshan were open to visit. On December 26, 2008, Wuhan, Haikou and Weishanhu formed the first escort fleet of the Chinese Navy. They set sail from a military port terminal in Sanya City, Hainan Province, and escorted to the Gulf of Aden and Somali waters. The escort mission lasted 124 days and nights with a voyage of more than 33,000 nautical miles. It provided escort for 41 batches of 166 ships, provided regional escorts for 46 ships and successfully rescued 3 foreign ships from being attacked. On April 28, 2009, they returned to the station.

On July 26, 2010, Wuhan participated in a live-fire exercise of the Navy's multi-arms contract organized by the South China Sea Fleet. The exercise was held in a certain area of the South China Sea, highlighting the actual use of weapons in contracted seas, air defense and missile defense, and air control in a complex electromagnetic environment.

== Gallery ==
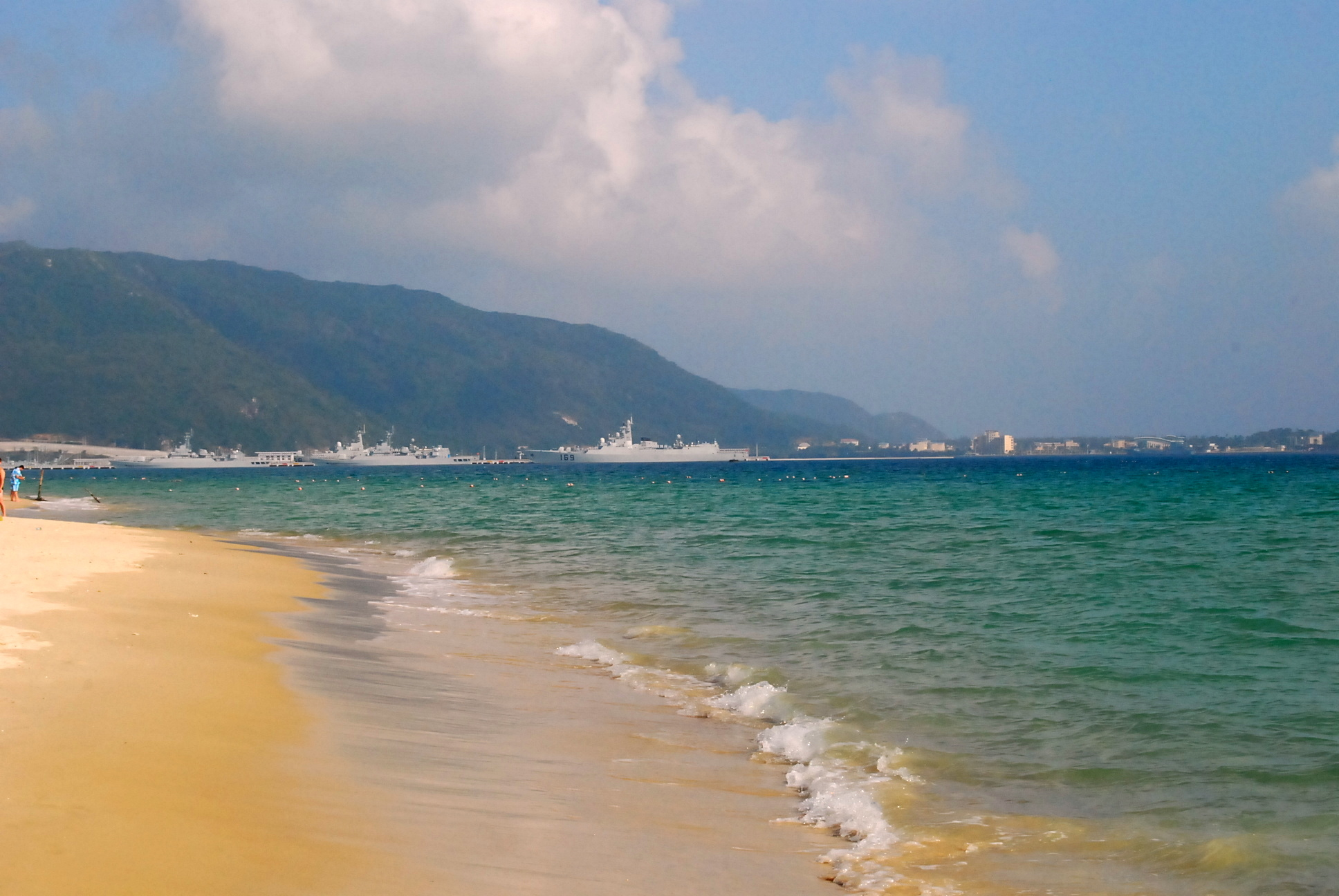
Wuhan entering Yalong Bay in December 2007.

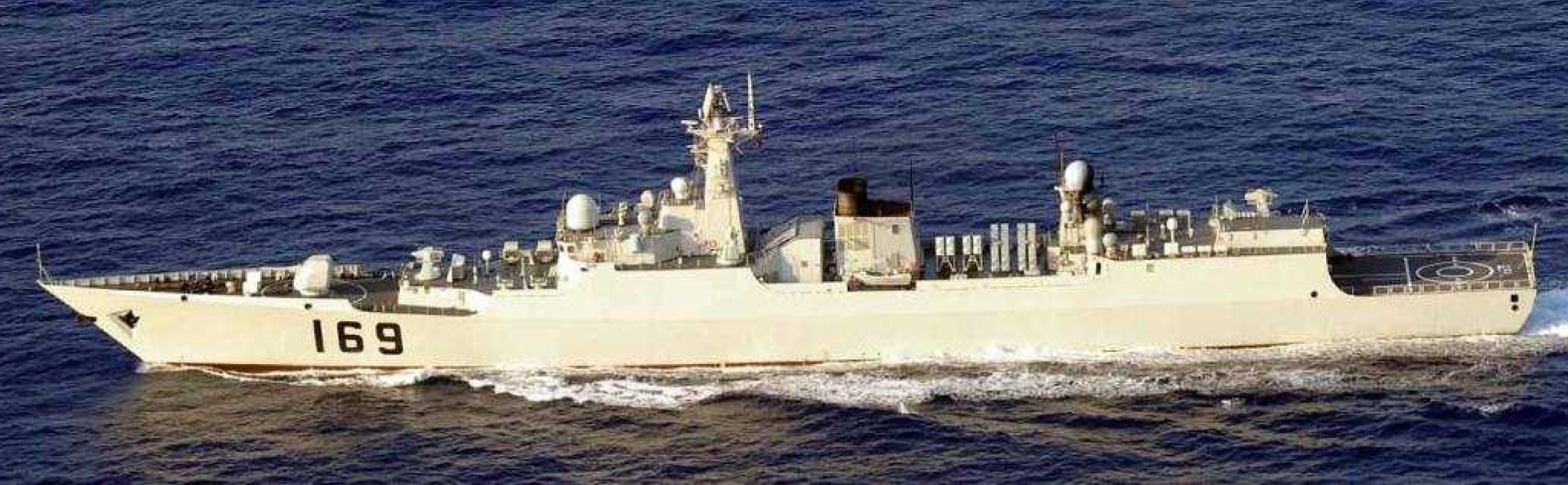
Wuhan underway on 6 May 2012.

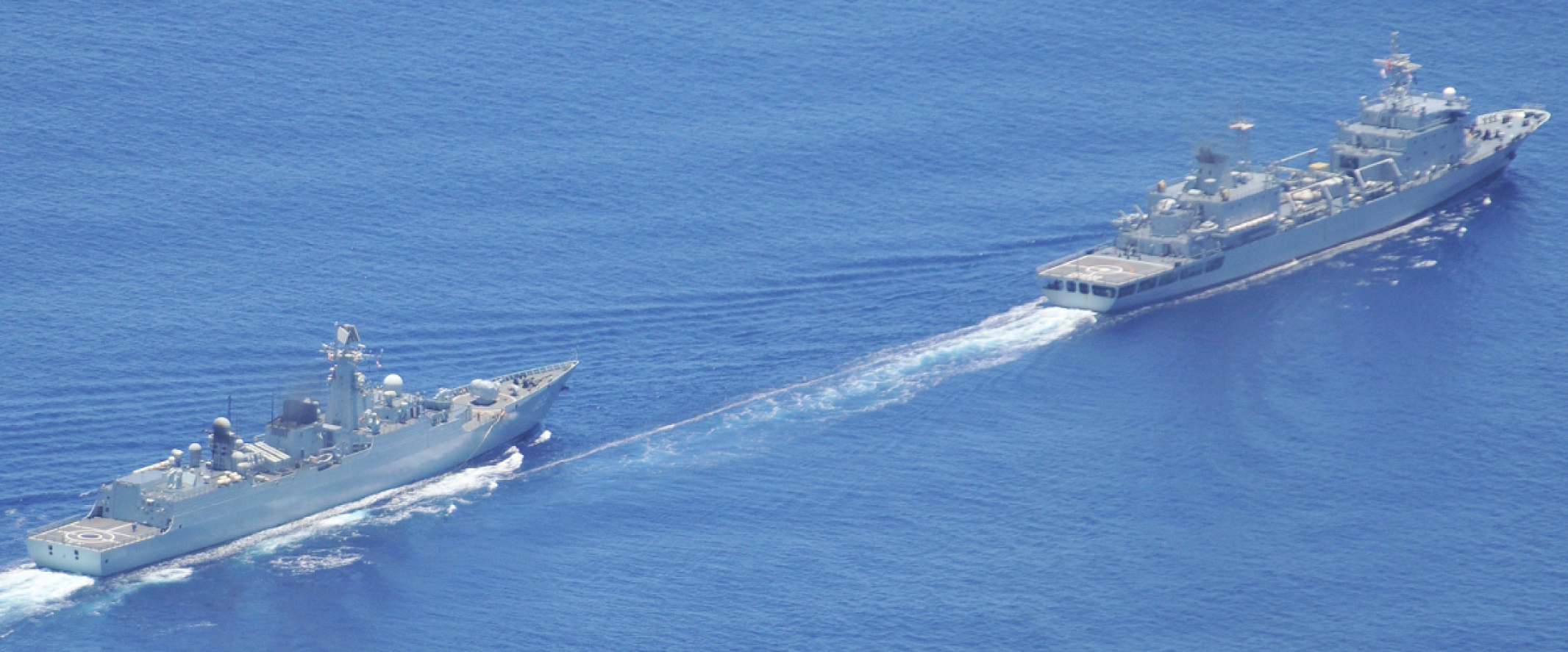
Wuhan underway on 10 June 2015.
