= Chinese destroyer Xi'an (153) =

Type 025C destroyer of the PLA Navy

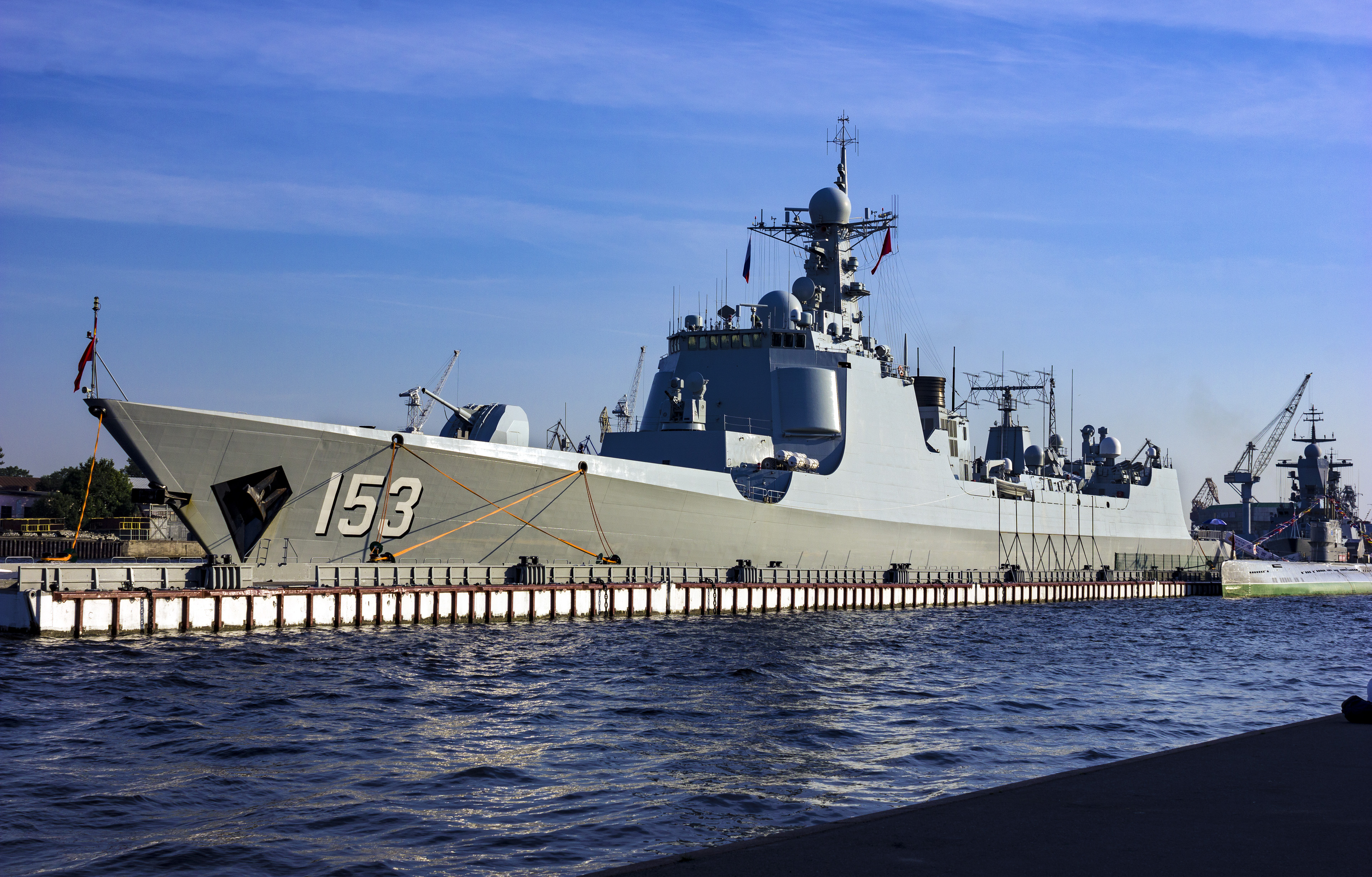
- Xi'an moored in Saint Petersburg on 27 July 2019

History

China
- Name: Xi'an
- Namesake: Xi'an; (西安)
- Builder: Jiangnan Shipyard, Shanghai
- Launched: 16 June 2012
- Completed: 30 December 2014
- Commissioned: 9 February 2015
- Home port: Zhoushan
- Identification: Pennant number: 153
- Status: Active

General characteristics
- Class & type: Type 052C destroyer
- Displacement: 7,000 tons
- Length: 155 m (508 ft 6 in)
- Beam: 17 m (55 ft 9 in)
- Draught: 6 m (19 ft 8 in)
- Propulsion: Combined diesel or gas; 2 x DA80 gas turbines (35.7 MW each); 2 x MTU 20V 956TB92 diesels (6 MW each)
- Speed: 29 knots (54 km/h; 33 mph)
- Range: 4,500 nautical miles (8,300 km; 5,200 mi) at 15 knots
- Complement: 280
- Sensors & processing systems: Type 346 radar (air search, fire control); Type 517 radar (air search); Type 364 radar (air and surface search); Type 344 radar (main gun fire control); Type 347G(2) radar (Type 730 fire control); Type 366 radar (YJ-62 fire control); Bow mounted sonar
- Electronic warfare & decoys: NRJ-6A
- Armament: 48 HHQ-9 surface-to-air missiles; 8 YJ-62 anti-ship cruise missiles; 1 × 100 mm PJ-87 gun; 2 × 30mm Type 730 close-in weapons systems; 6 x torpedo tubes; 4 x multiple rocket launchers (possibly multirole)
- Aircraft carried: 1 helicopter: Kamov Ka-28 or Harbin Z-9
- Aviation facilities: Hangar and helipad

Xi'an (153) is a Type 052C destroyer of the People's Liberation Army Navy. She was commissioned on 9 February 2015.

== Development and design ==
The Type 052C appears to share the same basic hull design as the Type 052B destroyer, which in turn is based on the Type 051B destroyer. Stealth features are incorporated. They uses predominantly Chinese systems derived from earlier foreign technology; the preceding Type 052 and Type 052B destroyers used a mixture of Russian and Chinese systems.

The Type 052C propulsion is in the combined diesel or gas (CODOG) arrangement, with two Ukrainian DA80 gas turbines and two MTU 20V 956TB92 diesel engines. The DA80s had blade problems and may have contributed to the last two Type 052Cs sitting pierside at the shipyard for two years without being accepted by the PLAN.

A Kamov Ka-28 or Harbin Z-9 helicopter may operate from the rear hangar and flight deck. The Ka-28 is equipped with a search radar and dipping sonar and can also employ sonobuoys, torpedoes, depth charges, or mines. The Z-9 is a variant of the Airbus Helicopters AS365 Dauphin. The naval variant of the Z-9, the Z-9C, is equipped with the KLC-1 search radar, dipping sonar, and is typically armed with a single, lightweight torpedo. Either helicopter significantly improves the anti-submarine capabilities of the Type 052C.

The main gun is a 100 mm (4 in) PJ-87. The gun suffered from jamming and may have influenced the decision to adopt a different weapon for the Type 052D destroyer. The weapon has a rate of fire of 25 rounds per minute. Close-in defence is provided by two seven-barrel 30 mm (1.2 in) Type 730 CIWS, one mounted forward of the bridge and one atop the hangar. Each gun has a maximum rate of fire of 4200 rounds per minute.

== Construction and career ==
Xi'an was launched on 16 June 2012 at the Jiangnan Shipyard in Shanghai. She was commissioned on 9 February 2015.

According to the Liberation Army Daily report on December 22, 2016, Xi'an encountered a foreign aircraft approaching in the East China Sea and warned and collected evidence in English. Xi'an was designated as the command ship of the Chinese formation participating in the 2016 RIMPAC. It participated in the exercise for 69 days and sailed for more than 15,000 nautical miles. It led the formation to complete 16 subject exercises in 3 categories of maritime blockade operations.

== Gallery ==
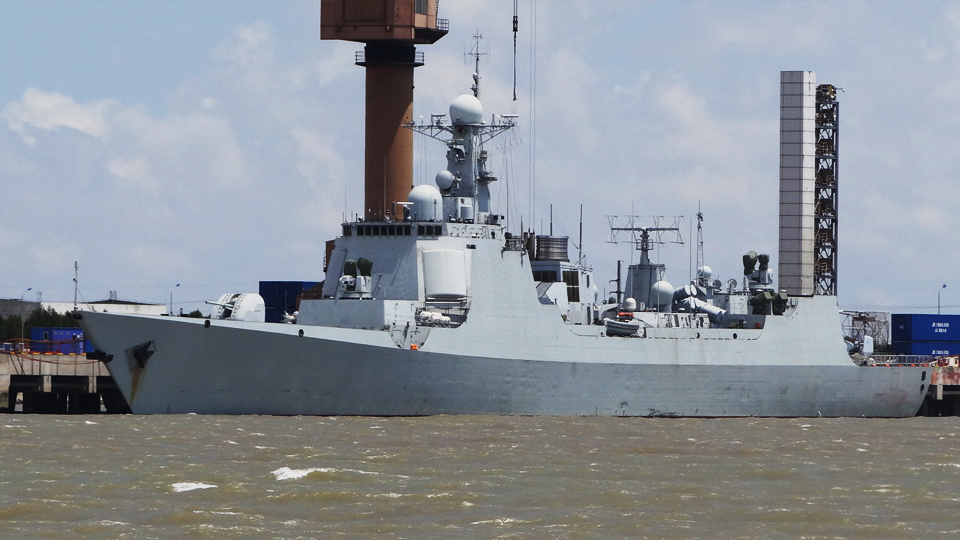
Xi'an moored at Jiangnan shipyard on 7 August 2014.

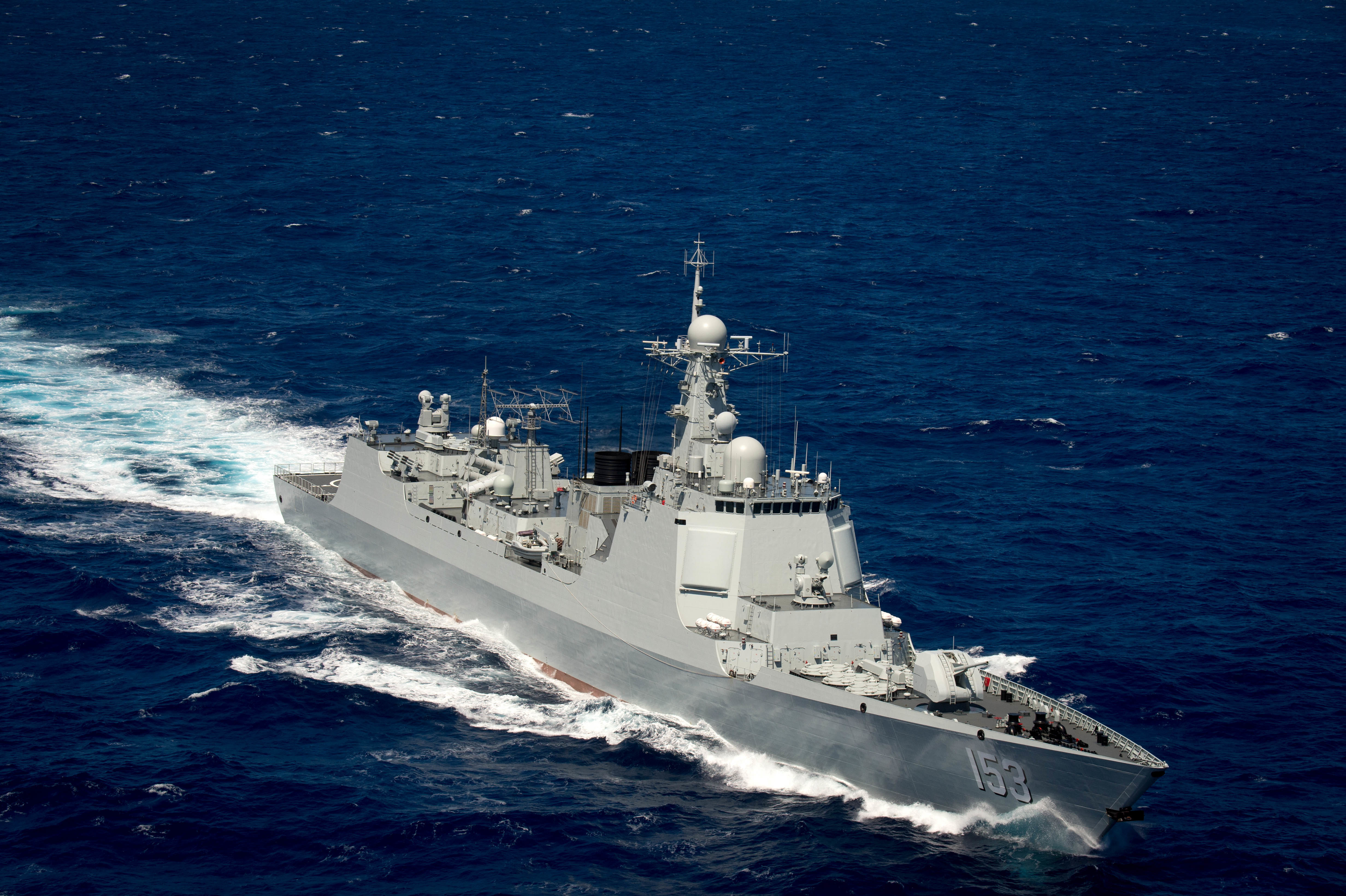
Xi'an underway during RIMPAC on 28 July 2016.

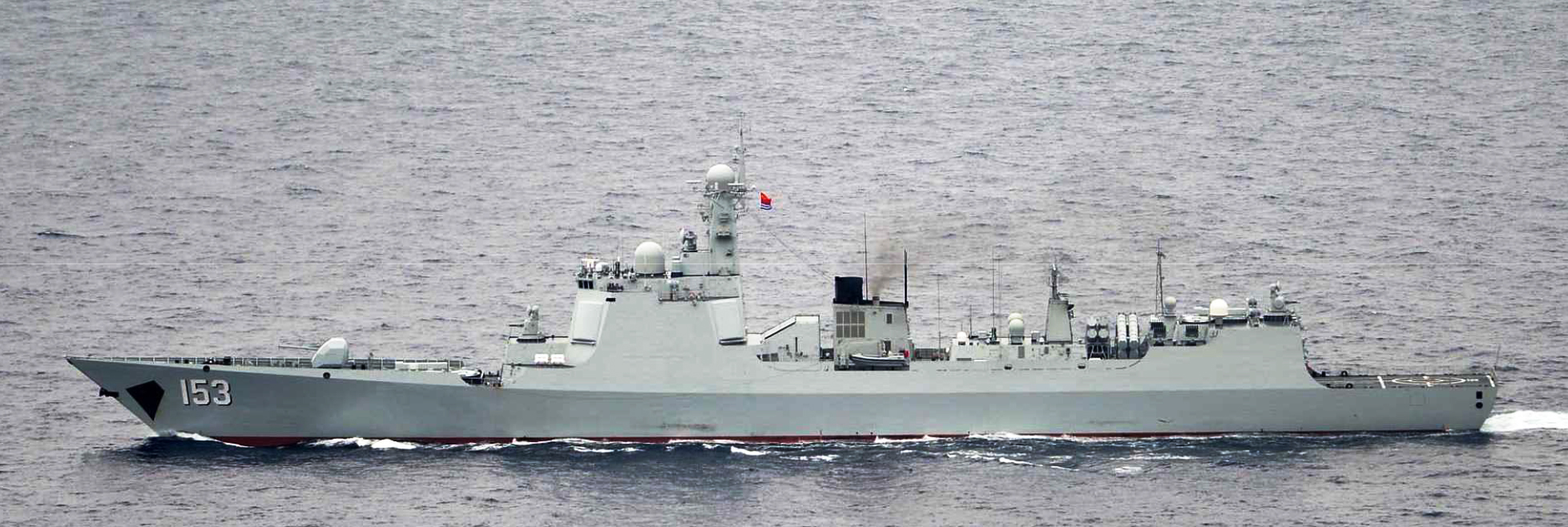
Xi'an underway on 16 August 2016.

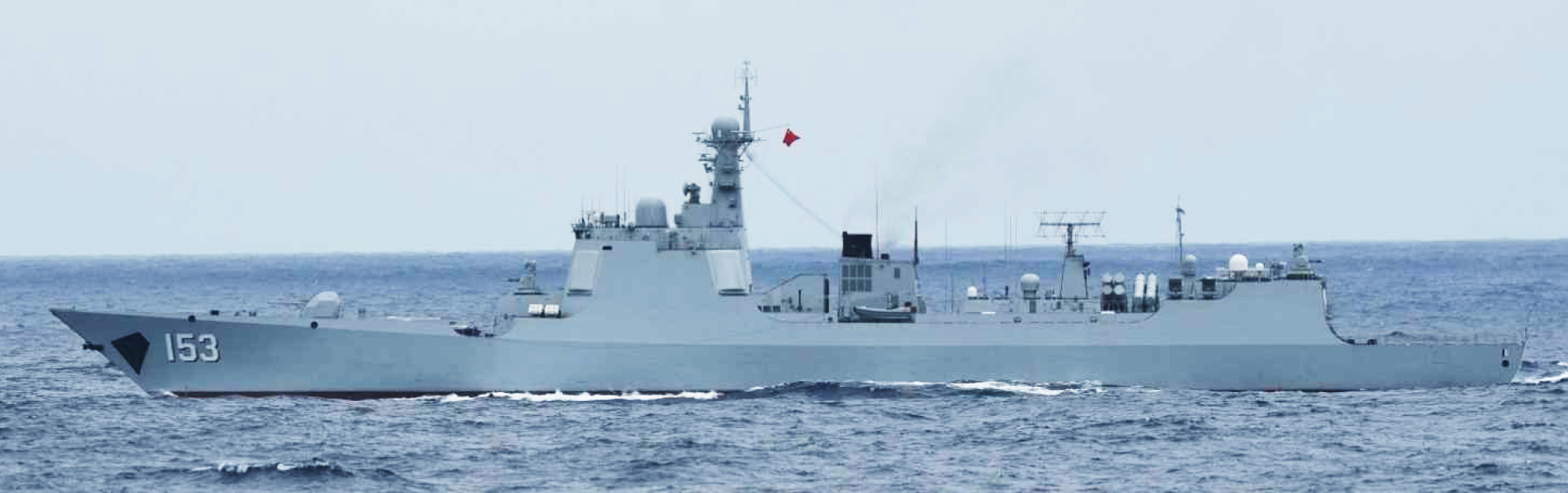
Xi'an underway on 5 April 2019.

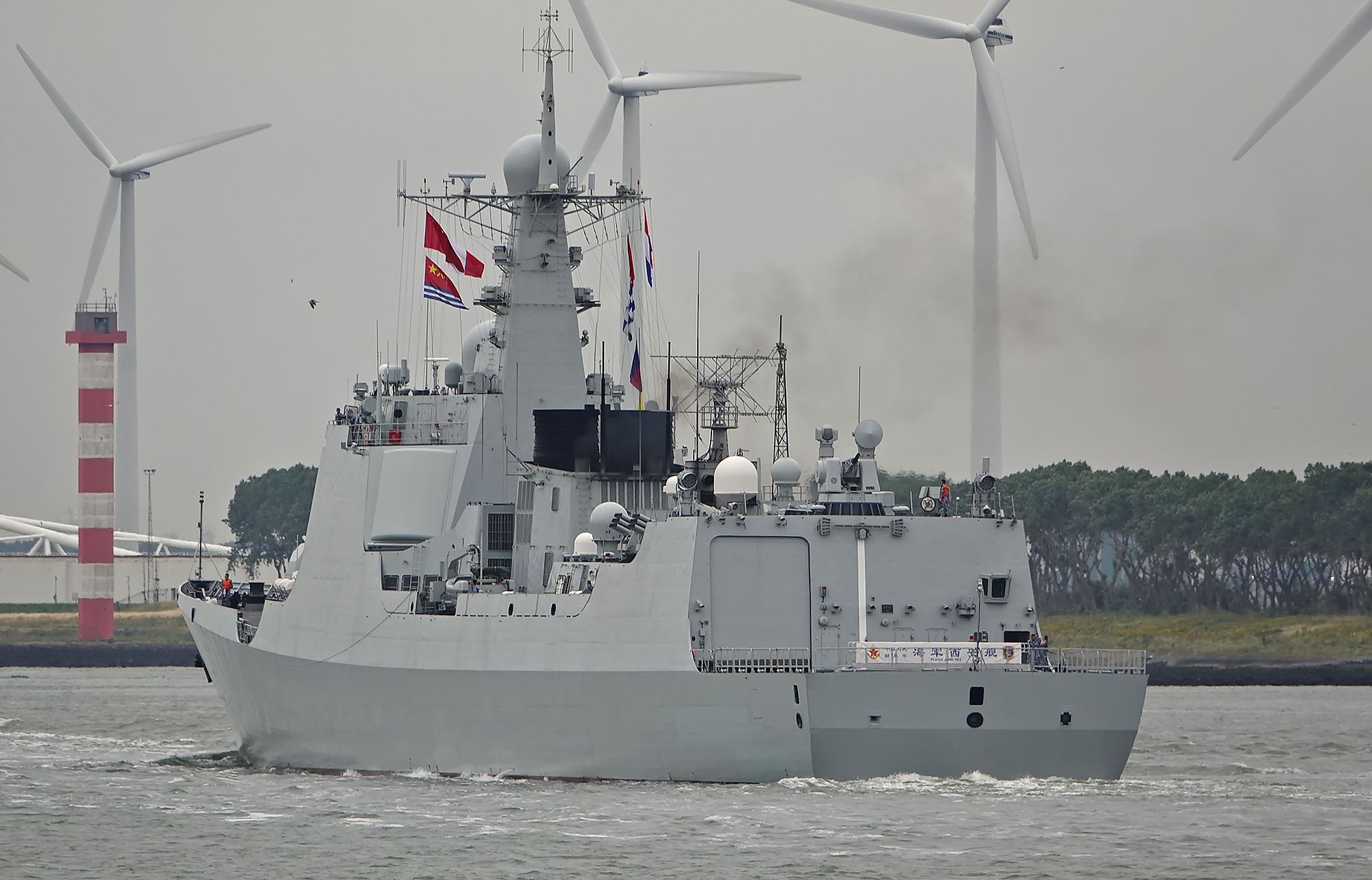
Xi'an underway at Hook of Holland on 15 July 2019.

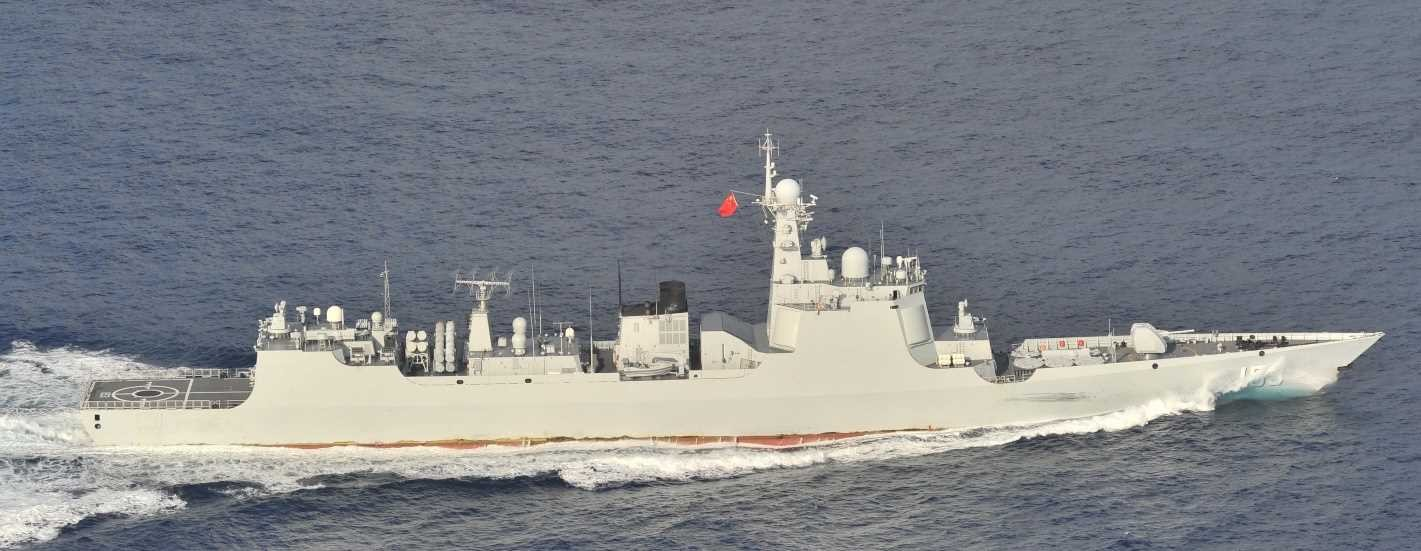
Xi'an underway on 28 October 2019.
