= Chinese frigate Jingzhou =

Type 054A frigate of the PLA Navy

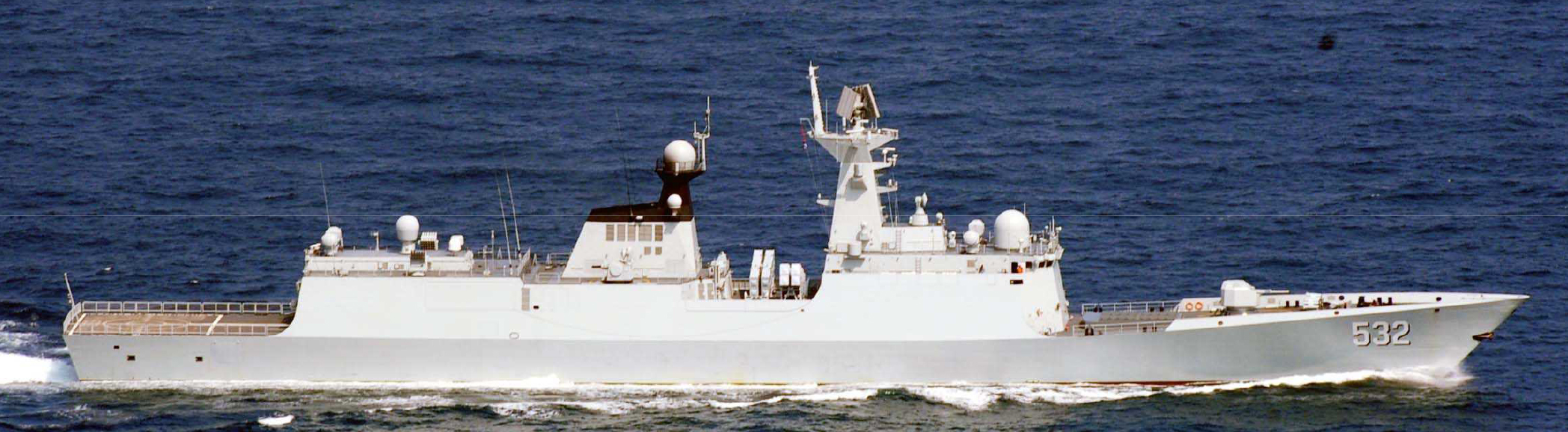
- Jingzhou underway on 17 August 2016

History

China
- Name: Jingzhou
- Namesake: Jingzhou; (荆州)
- Builder: Hudong–Zhonghua Shipbuilding, Shanghai
- Laid down: July 2013
- Launched: 22 January 2015
- Commissioned: 5 January 2016
- Home port: Zhoushan
- Identification: Pennant number: 532
- Status: Active

General characteristics
- Class & type: Type 054A frigate
- Displacement: 4,053 tonnes (full)
- Length: 134.1 m (440 ft)
- Beam: 16 m (52 ft)
- Draft: 4.5 m
- Propulsion: CODAD, 4 × Shaanxi 16 PA6 STC diesels, 5700 kW (7600+ hp @ 1084 rpm) each
- Speed: 27 knots estimated
- Range: 8,025 nautical miles (9,235 mi; 14,862 km) estimated
- Complement: 165
- Sensors & processing systems: Type 382 Radar; Type 344 Radar (Mineral-ME Band Stand) OTH target acquisition and SSM fire control radar; 4 × Type 345 Radar(MR-90 Front Dome) SAM fire control radars; MR-36A surface search radar, I-band; Type 347G 76 mm gun fire control radar; 2 × Racal RM-1290 navigation radars, I-band; MGK-335 medium frequency active/passive sonar system; H/SJG-206 towed array sonar; ZKJ-4B/6 (developed from Thomson-CSF TAVITAC) combat data system; HN-900 Data link (Chinese equivalent of Link 11A/B, to be upgraded); SNTI-240 SATCOM; AKD5000S Ku band SATCOM
- Electronic warfare & decoys: Type 922-1 radar warning receiver; HZ-100 ECM & ELINT system; Kashtan-3 missile jamming system
- Armament: 1 × 32-cell VLS; HQ-16 SAM; Yu-8 anti submarine rocket launcher; 2 × 4 C-803 anti-ship / land attack cruise missiles; 1 × PJ26 76 mm dual-purpose gun; 2 × Type 730 7-barrel 30 mm CIWS guns or Type 1130; 2 × 3 324mm Yu-7 ASW torpedo launchers; 2 × 6 Type 87 240mm anti-submarine rocket launcher (36 rockets carried); 2 × Type 726-4 18-tube decoy rocket launchers
- Aircraft carried: 1 Kamov Ka-28 'Helix' or Harbin Z-9C
- Aviation facilities: hangar

Jingzhou (532) is a Type 054A frigate of the People's Liberation Army Navy. She was commissioned on 5 January 2016.

== Development and design ==
The Type 054A carries HQ-16 medium-range air defence missiles and anti-submarine missiles in a vertical launching system (VLS) system. The HQ-16 has a range of up to 50 km, with superior range and engagement angles to the Type 054's HQ-7. The Type 054A's VLS uses a hot launch method; a shared common exhaust system is sited between the two rows of rectangular launching tubes.

The four AK-630 close-in weapon systems (CIWS) of the Type 054 were replaced with two Type 730 CIWS on the Type 054A. The autonomous Type 730 provides improved reaction time against close-in threats.

== Construction and career ==
Jingzhou was launched on 22 January 2015 at the Hudong–Zhonghua Shipbuilding in Shanghai. She was commissioned on 5 January 2016.

On 28 April 2017, Chaohu, Changchun and Jingzhou arrived in Davao City, Mindanao for a visit. On 25 May, the ships conducted an exercise with the Myanmar Navy, which was China's first time to hold an exercise with Myanmar. On 12 June, they arrived in Karachi. On 23 July, same ships were sent for a visit to Piraeus Port.

== Gallery ==
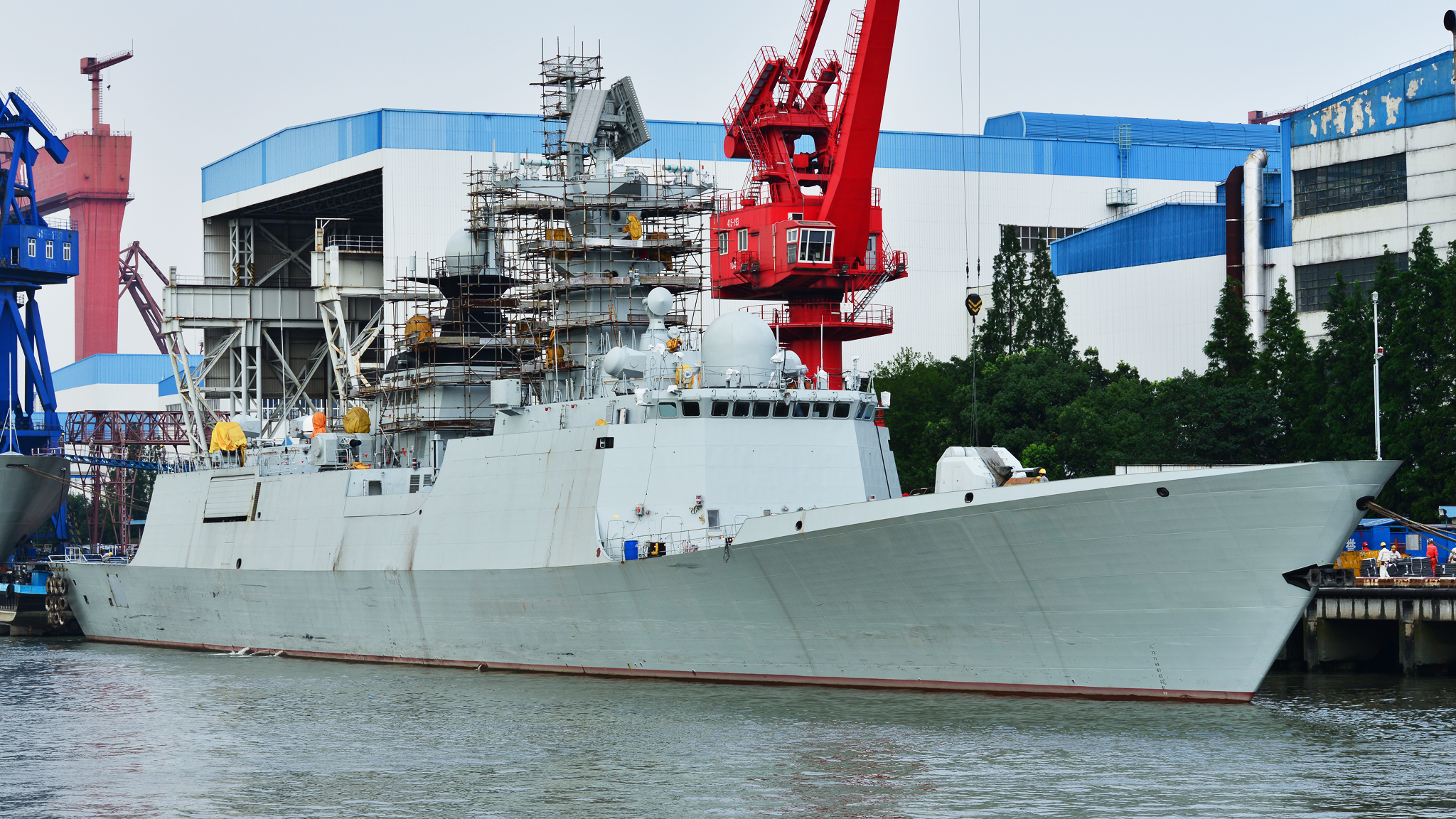
Jingzhou fitting out on 28 July 2015.

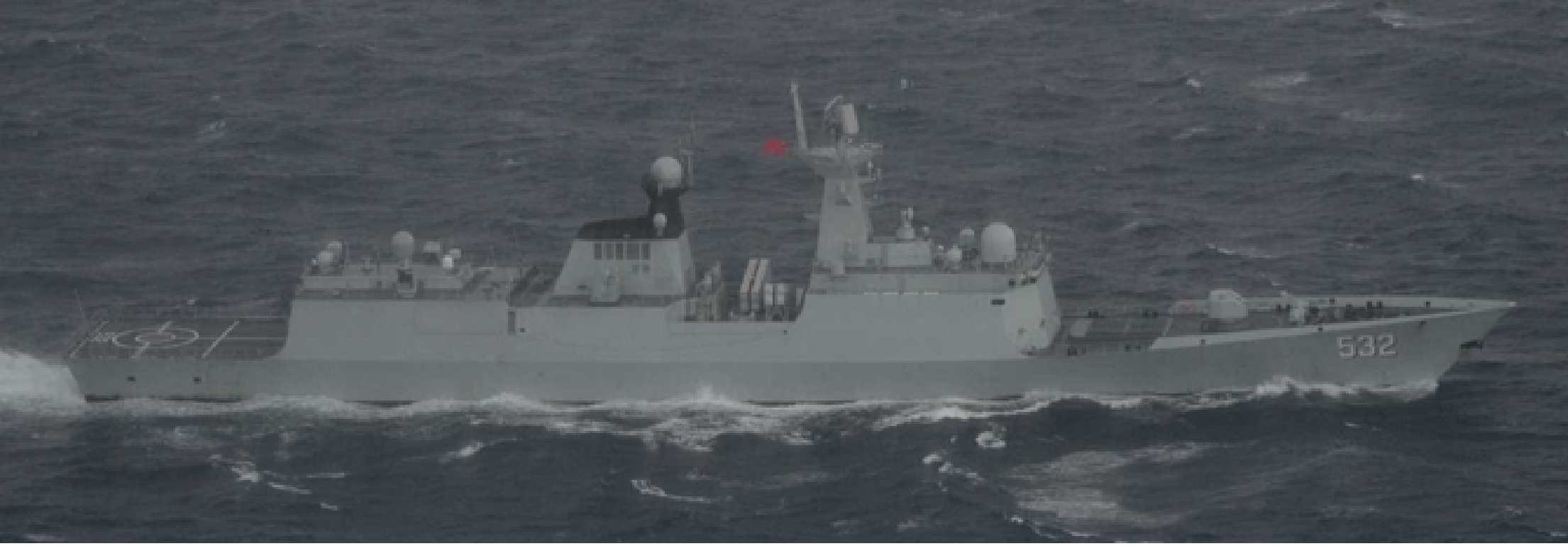
Jingzhou underway on 28 March 2019.

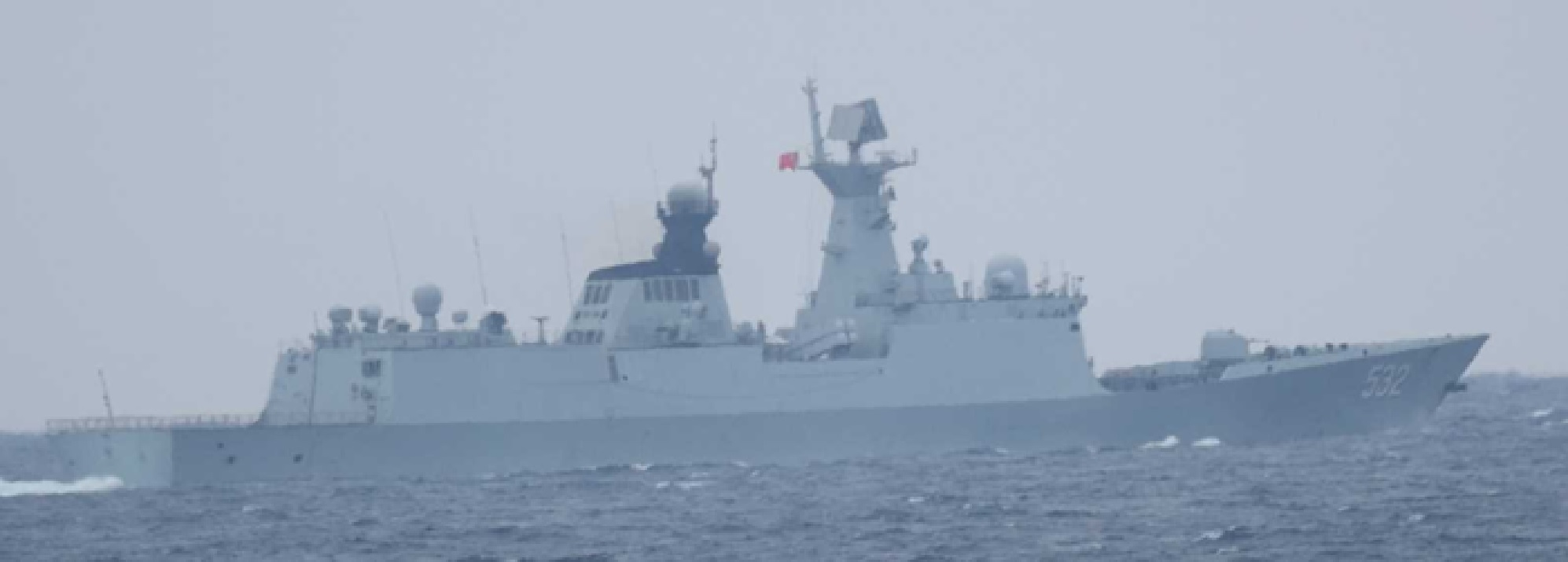
Jingzhou underway on 2 April 2019.

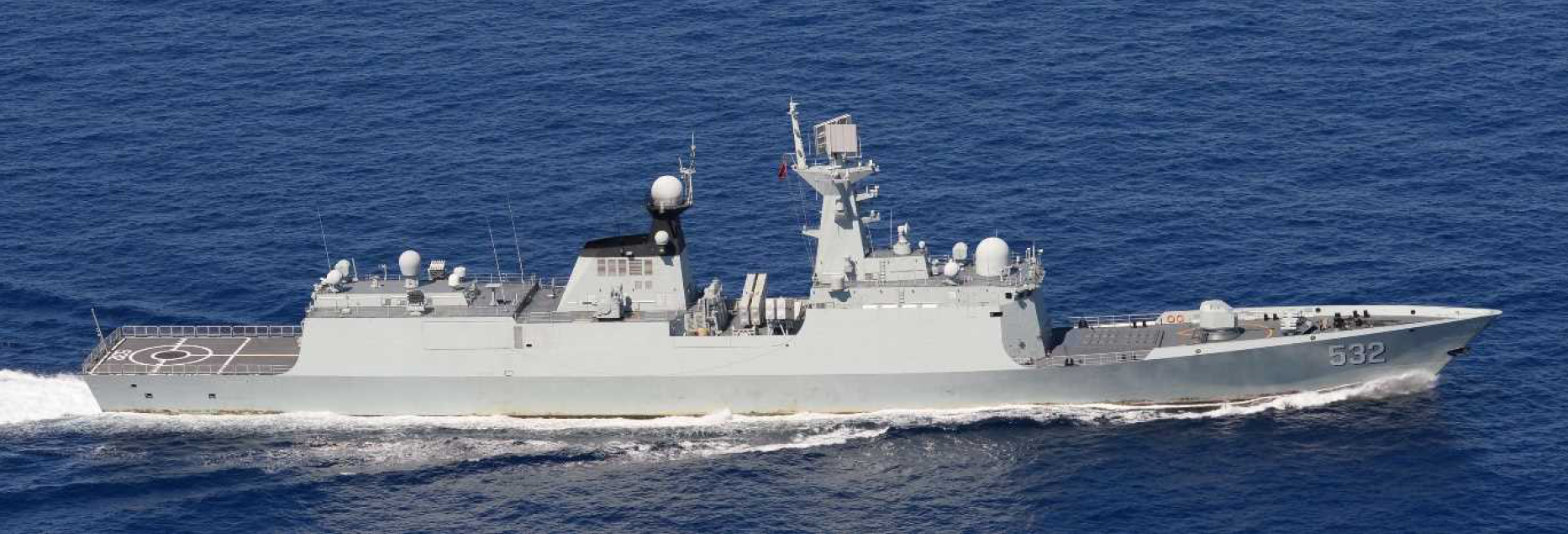
Jingzhou underway on 29 July 2019.

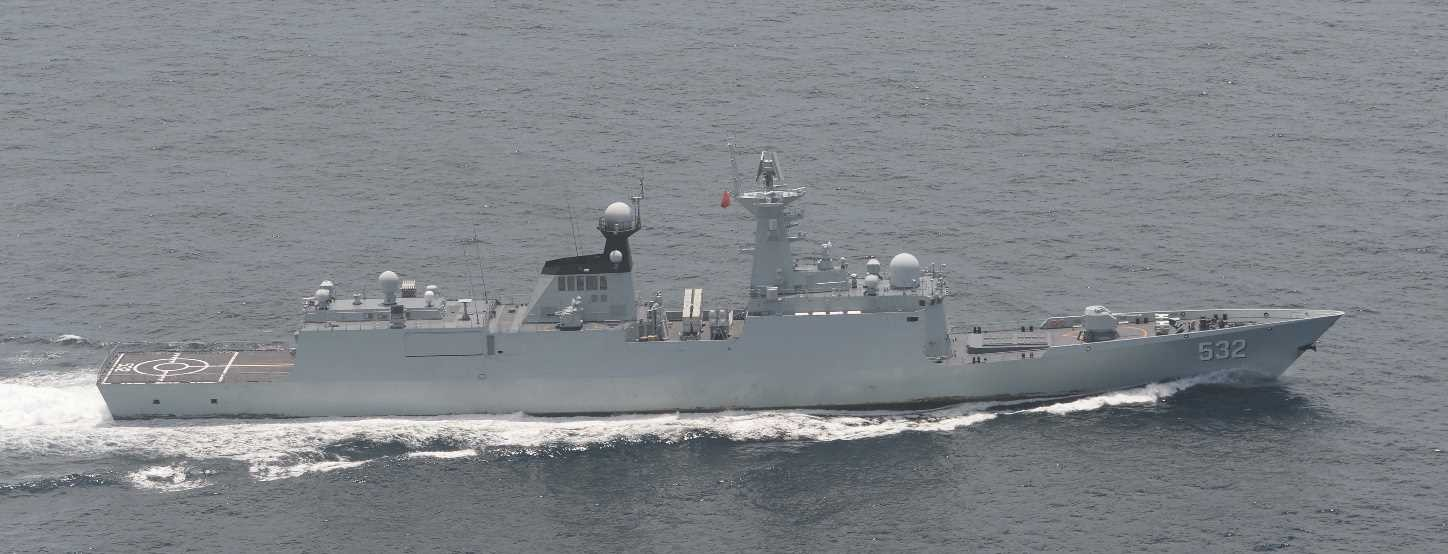
Jingzhou underway on 1 August 2019.

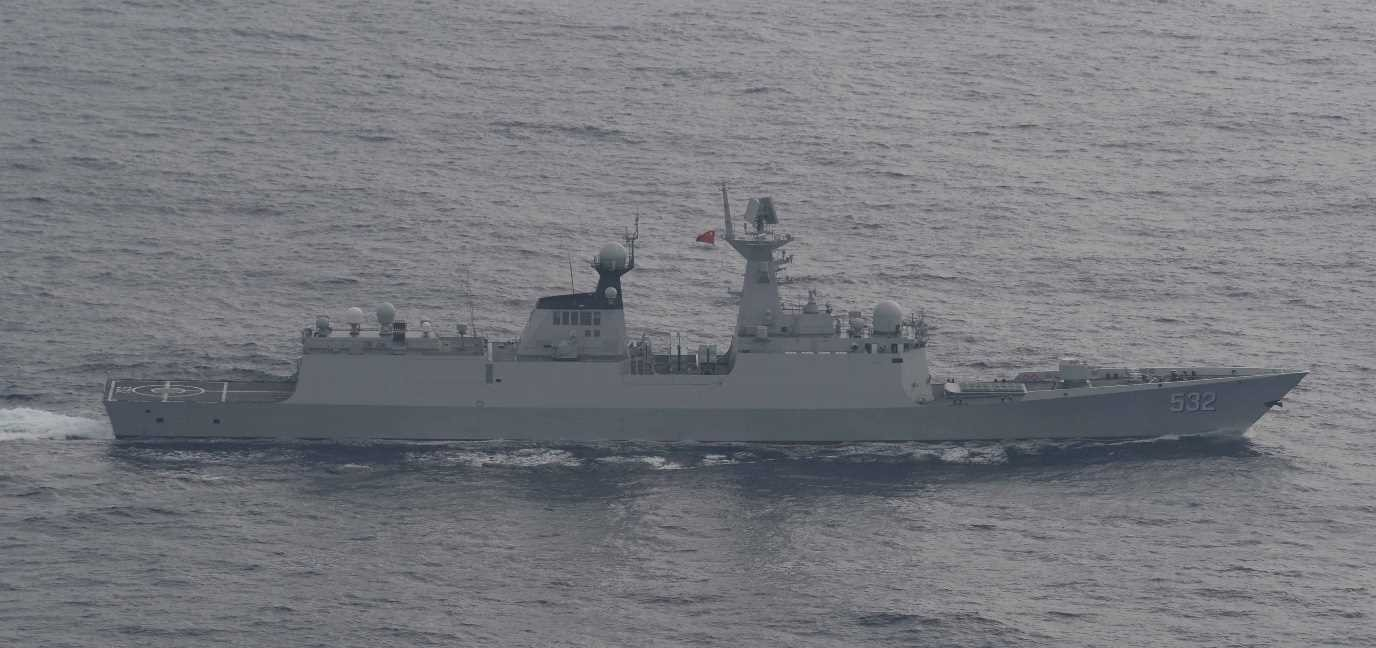
Jingzhou underway on 30 April 2020.
