= Chinese frigate Changzhou =

Type 054A frigate of the PLA Navy

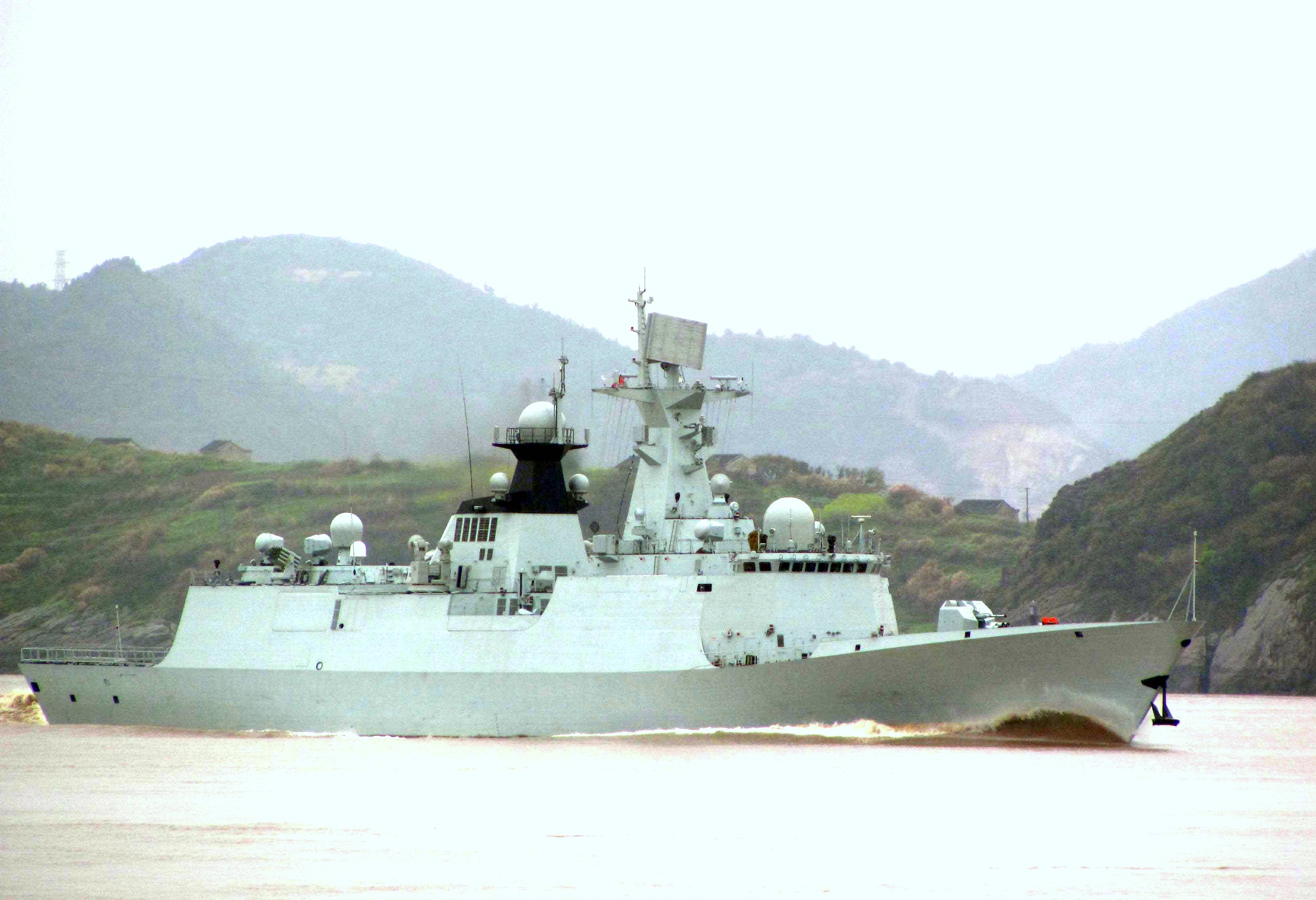
- Changzhou underway on 5 April 2011

History

China
- Name: Changzhou
- Namesake: Changzhou; (常州)
- Builder: Hudong–Zhonghua Shipbuilding, Shanghai
- Launched: 18 May 2010
- Commissioned: 30 May 2011
- Identification: Pennant number: 549
- Status: Active

General characteristics
- Class & type: Type 054A frigate
- Displacement: 4,053 tonnes (full)
- Length: 134.1 m (440 ft)
- Beam: 16 m (52 ft)
- Propulsion: CODAD, 4 × Shaanxi 16 PA6 STC diesels, 5700 kW (7600+ hp @ 1084 rpm) each
- Speed: 27 knots estimated
- Range: 8,025 nautical miles (9,235 mi; 14,862 km) estimated
- Complement: 165
- Sensors & processing systems: Type 382 Radar; Type 344 Radar (Mineral-ME Band Stand) OTH target acquisition and SSM fire control radar; 4 × Type 345 Radar (MR-90 Front Dome) SAM fire control radars; MR-36A surface search radar, I-band; Type 347G 76 mm gun fire control radar; 2 × Racal RM-1290 navigation radars, I-band; MGK-335 medium frequency active/passive sonar system; H/SJG-206 towed array sonar; ZKJ-4B/6 (developed from Thomson-CSF TAVITAC) combat data system; HN-900 Data link (Chinese equivalent of Link 11A/B, to be upgraded); SNTI-240 SATCOM; AKD5000S Ku band SATCOM
- Electronic warfare & decoys: Type 922-1 radar warning receiver; HZ-100 ECM & ELINT system; Kashtan-3 missile jamming system
- Armament: 1 × 32-cell VLS; HQ-16 SAM; Yu-8 anti submarine rocket launcher; 2 × 4 C-803 anti-ship / land attack cruise missiles; 1 × PJ26 76 mm dual-purpose gun; 2 × Type 730 7-barrel 30 mm CIWS guns or Type 1130; 2 × 3 324mm Yu-7 ASW torpedo launchers; 2 × 6 Type 87 240mm anti-submarine rocket launcher (36 rockets carried); 2 × Type 726-4 18-tube decoy rocket launchers
- Aircraft carried: 1 Kamov Ka-28 'Helix' or Harbin Z-9C
- Aviation facilities: hangar

Changzhou (549) is a Type 054A frigate of the People's Liberation Army Navy. She was commissioned on 30 May 2011.

== Development and design ==
The Type 054A carries HQ-16 medium-range air defence missiles and anti-submarine missiles in a vertical launching system (VLS) system. The HQ-16 has a range of up to 50 km, with superior range and engagement angles to the Type 054's HQ-7. The Type 054A's VLS uses a hot launch method; a shared common exhaust system is sited between the two rows of rectangular launching tubes.

The four AK-630 close-in weapon systems (CIWS) of the Type 054 were replaced with two Type 730 CIWS on the Type 054A. The autonomous Type 730 provides improved reaction time against close-in threats.

== Construction and career ==
Changzhou was launched on 18 May 2010 at the Hudong-Zhonghua Shipyard in Shanghai. She was commissioned on 30 May 2011.

During the 2019 novel coronavirus epidemic, on February 17, 2020, the Liberation Army Daily disclosed that a number of officers and soldiers in the eastern theater of the People's Liberation Army are being quarantined for observation, including Yu Songqiu, captain of Changzhou. According to reports, the theater is adopting measures such as strict management, temperature measurement and disinfection, and returning to the team to isolate, and will adjust the plan to try to ensure that the annual training mission is not affected. The report quoted Yu Songqiu as saying that he himself was under observation in the guest house of a certain detachment, and some officers and soldiers of various units were also under quarantine observation, but the work was smooth and orderly, and the enthusiasm for training and preparation was unabated. In order to return to the team early and complete the isolation as soon as possible, he stopped his vacation and returned to the camp on the fifth day of the Lunar New Year. He is currently using the free time of isolation to study training problems.

== Gallery ==
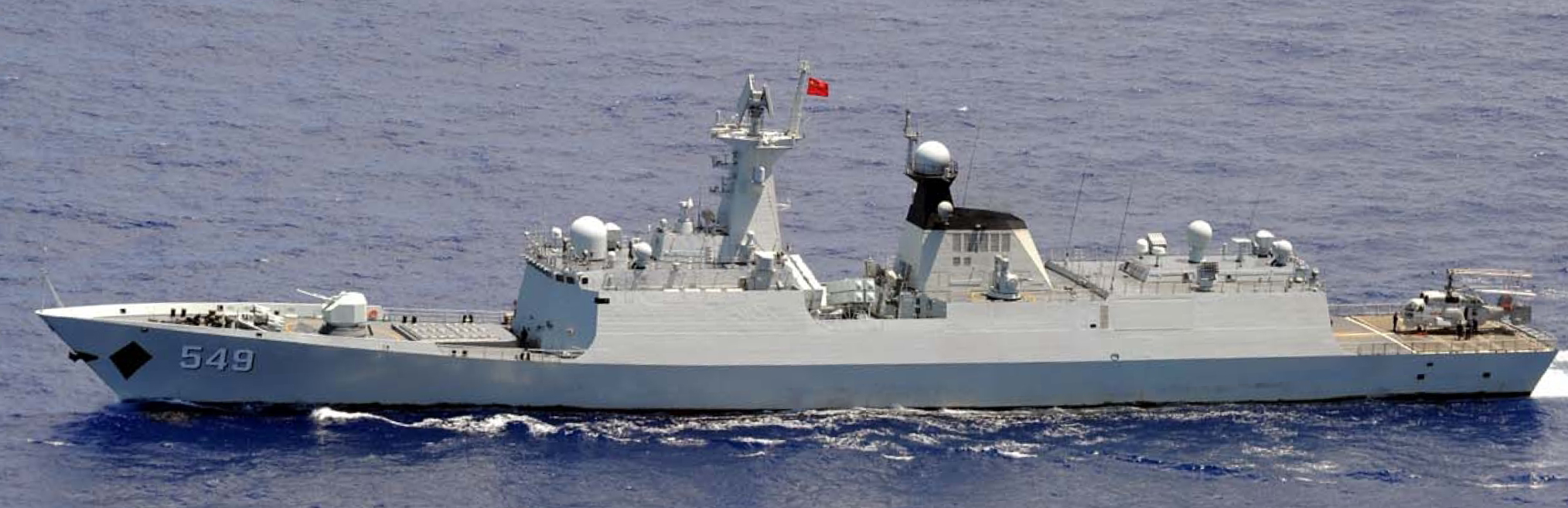
Changzhou underway on 8 September 2013.

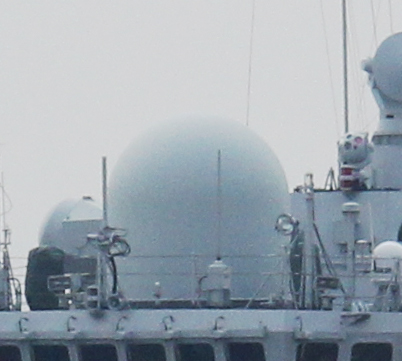
Changzhou's radar on 4 April 2014.

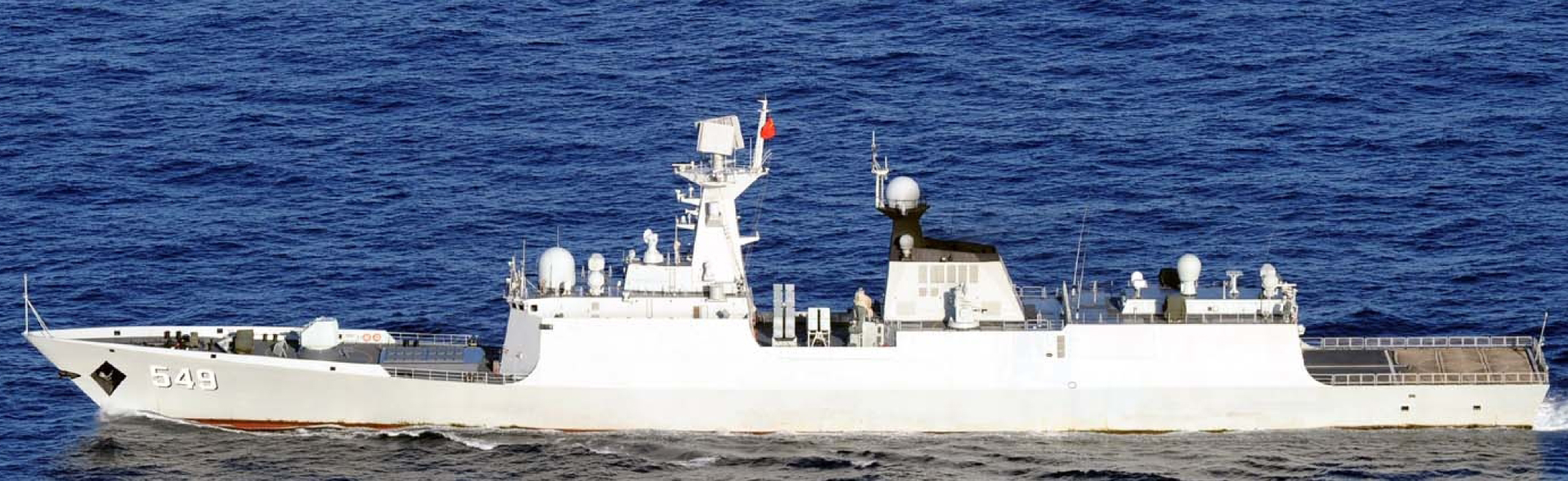
Changzhou underway on 27 August 2014.

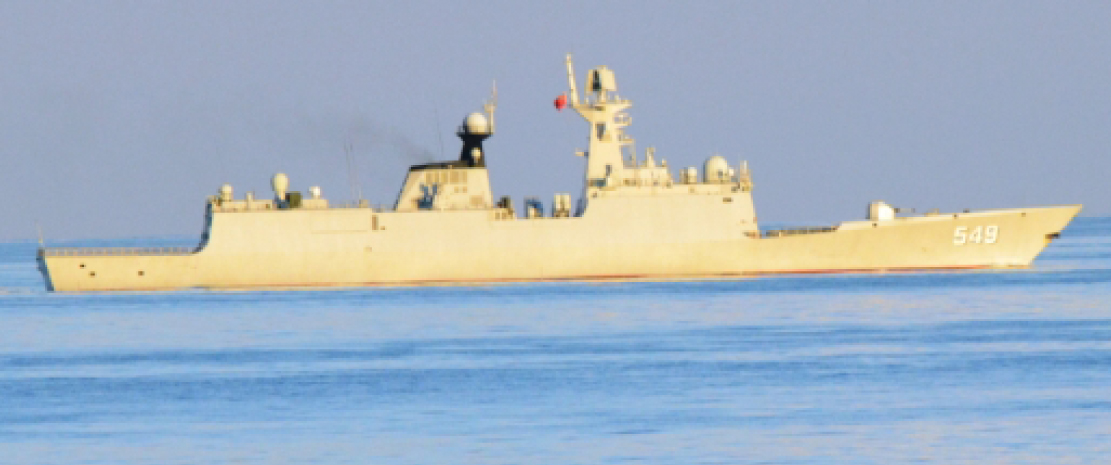
Changzhou underway on 1 August 2015.

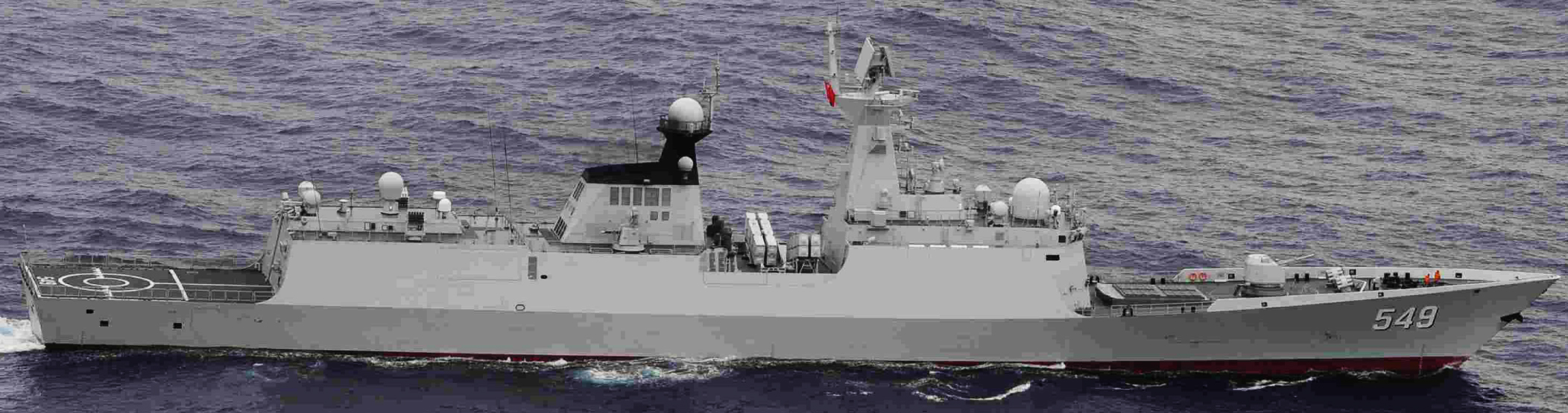
Changzhou underway on 18 July 2015.
