= Type 052B destroyer =

Class of Chinese guided-missile destroyers

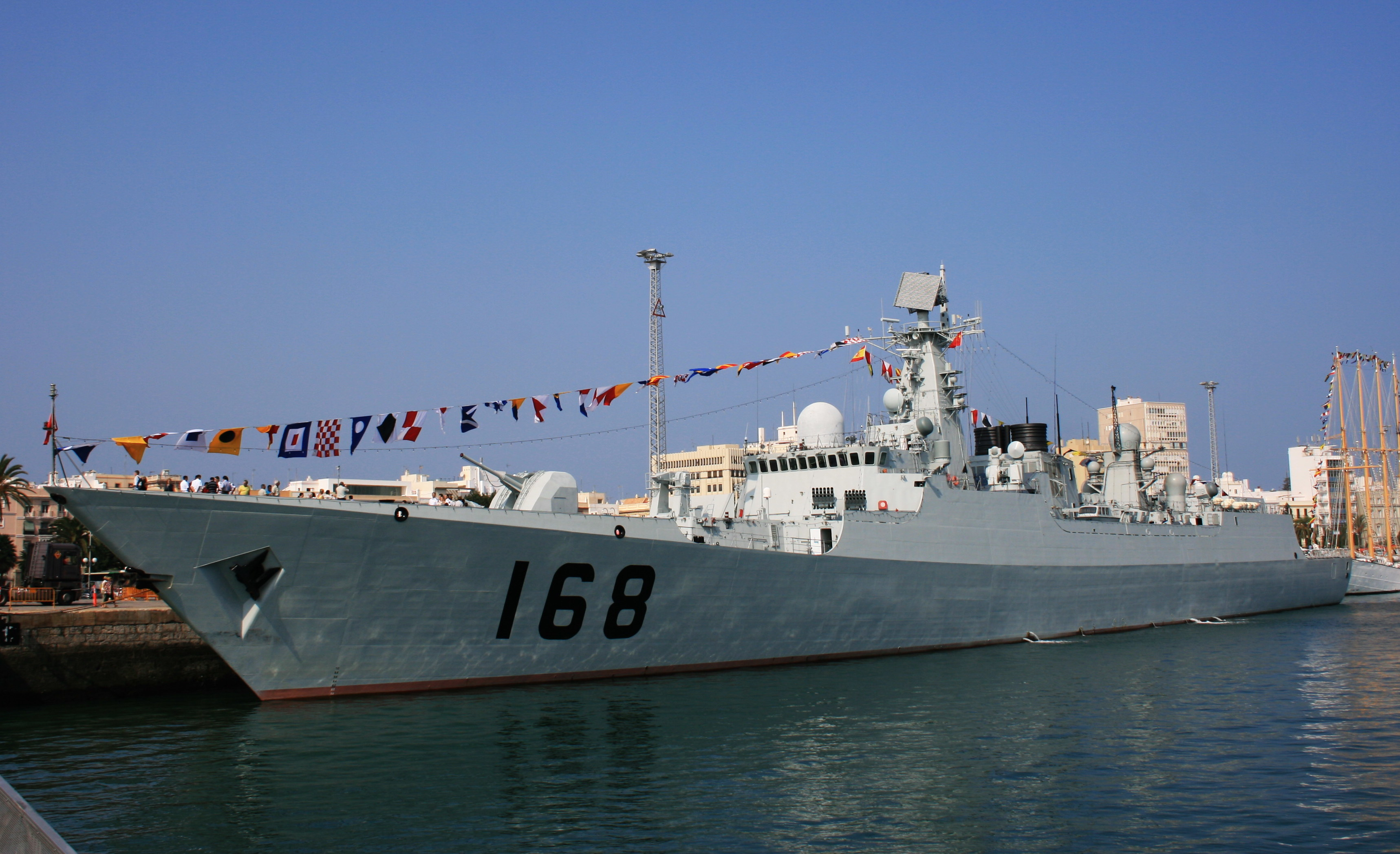
- Guangzhou (168) in Cádiz in 2007 (appearance before the modernization)

Class overview
- Builders: Jiangnan Shipyard
- Operators: People's Liberation Army Navy Surface Force
- Preceded by: Type 052 (based on hull family); Type 956E / 956EM (based on commissioning date)
- Succeeded by: Type 052C (based on hull family and commissioning date)
- Built: 2001–2004
- In service: July 2004–present
- Planned: 2
- Completed: 2
- Active: 2

General characteristics
- Type: Guided-missile destroyer
- Displacement: 7,000 tons
- Length: 155 m (509 ft)
- Beam: 17 m (56 ft)
- Draught: 6 m (20 ft)
- Propulsion: Combined diesel or gas; 2 × DA80 gas turbines (35.7 MW); 2 × MTU 1163 TB 83 diesel engines (10 MW)
- Speed: 29 kn (54 km/h; 33 mph)
- Range: 4500 nm at 14 kn
- Complement: 280
- Sensors & processing systems: Fregat MAE-3 (Top Plate) 3D air search radar; Type 364 search radar; Front-Dome fire control radar; Mineral-ME (Band Stand) fire control radar; Type 344 fire control radar; Type 347G(2) fire control radar; Bow-mounted sonar; Towed array sonar
- Electronic warfare & decoys: SRW 210A ESM; Type 984 jammer; Type 985 jammer
- Armament: 16 × YJ-83 anti-ship missiles; 2 × Shtil-1 single-arm surface-to-air missile launchers (total 48 missiles); 1 × H/PJ87 100 mm main gun; 2 × Type 730 CIWS; 4 × multiple rocket launchers; 2 × triple B515 324mm antisubmarine torpedo tubes (Yu-7)
- Aircraft carried: 1 helicopter: Harbin Z-9 or Kamov Ka-28
- Aviation facilities: Flight deck and hangar

The Type 052B (NATO/OSD Luyang I-class destroyer) is a class of guided-missile destroyers in the Chinese People's Liberation Army Navy Surface Force (PLAN). Two ships - Guangzhou and Wuhan - were begun in 2001 and commissioned in July and December 2004 respectively. The Type 052B was China's first modern destroyer design and the first Chinese design to incorporate true medium-range air defence capability in the form of Russian Shtil-1 (improved navalized Buk, NATO designation SA-N-12) surface-to-air missiles (SAM). The H/AKJ-16 VLS-based HQ-16 surface-to-air missiles were installed on the ships during modernization.

== Programme ==
In the early 2000's, China pursued multiple - and sometimes concurrent - programmes to acquire modern destroyers, purchasing Sovremennys from Russia and constructing the Type 052B, Type 051C, and Type 052C. These ships also represented steps to develop adequate air defense capabilities by adopting Russian air defense technology.; the 25-km range Uragan (navalized Buk, NATO designation SA-N-7) on the Sovremenny; the 35-km range Shtil-1 on the Type 052B; long-range area air defense with the 150-km range Rif-M (navalized S-300, NATO designation SA-N-20) on the Type 051C; and finally the Chinese 100-km range HHQ-9 (S-300 derivative) on the Type 052C.

The Type 052B's air defence capabilities were obsolete upon entering service when compared to contemporary American and Japanese designs. Nonetheless it represented a considerable general improvement over previous Chinese warships and was the precursor to later Chinese air warfare destroyers.

== Design ==
The hull is based on the Type 051B destroyer with added stealth features.

== Ships of Class ==
Number	Pennant number	Name	Builder	Launched	Commissioned	Fleet	Status
1	168	广州 / Guangzhou	Jiangnan	25 May 2002	15 July 2004	South Sea Fleet	Active
2	169	武汉 / Wuhan	Jiangnan	9 September 2002	December 2004	South Sea Fleet	Active

== Gallery ==
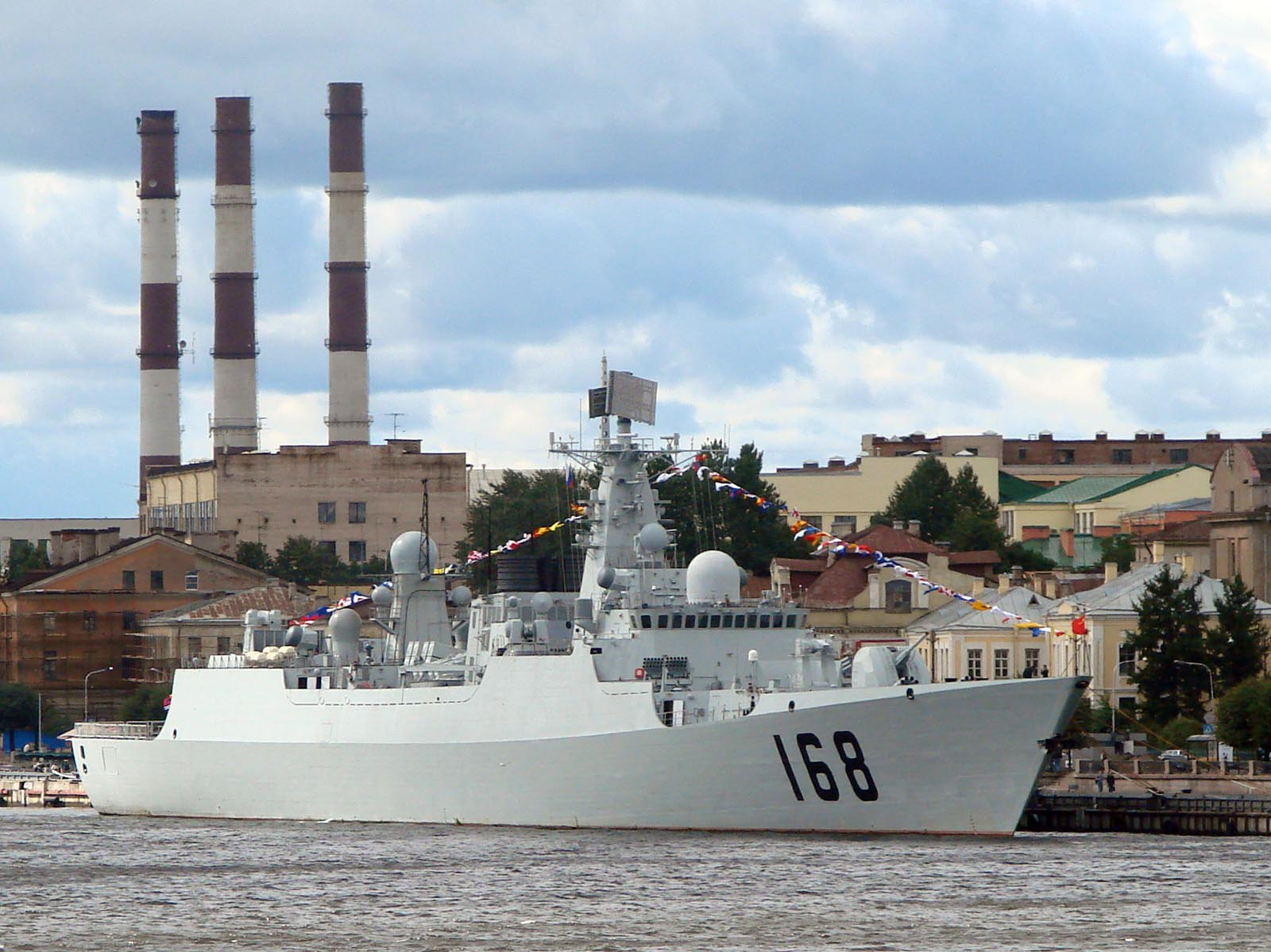
Type 052B destroyer Guangzhou (168) in Saint Petersburg, Russia

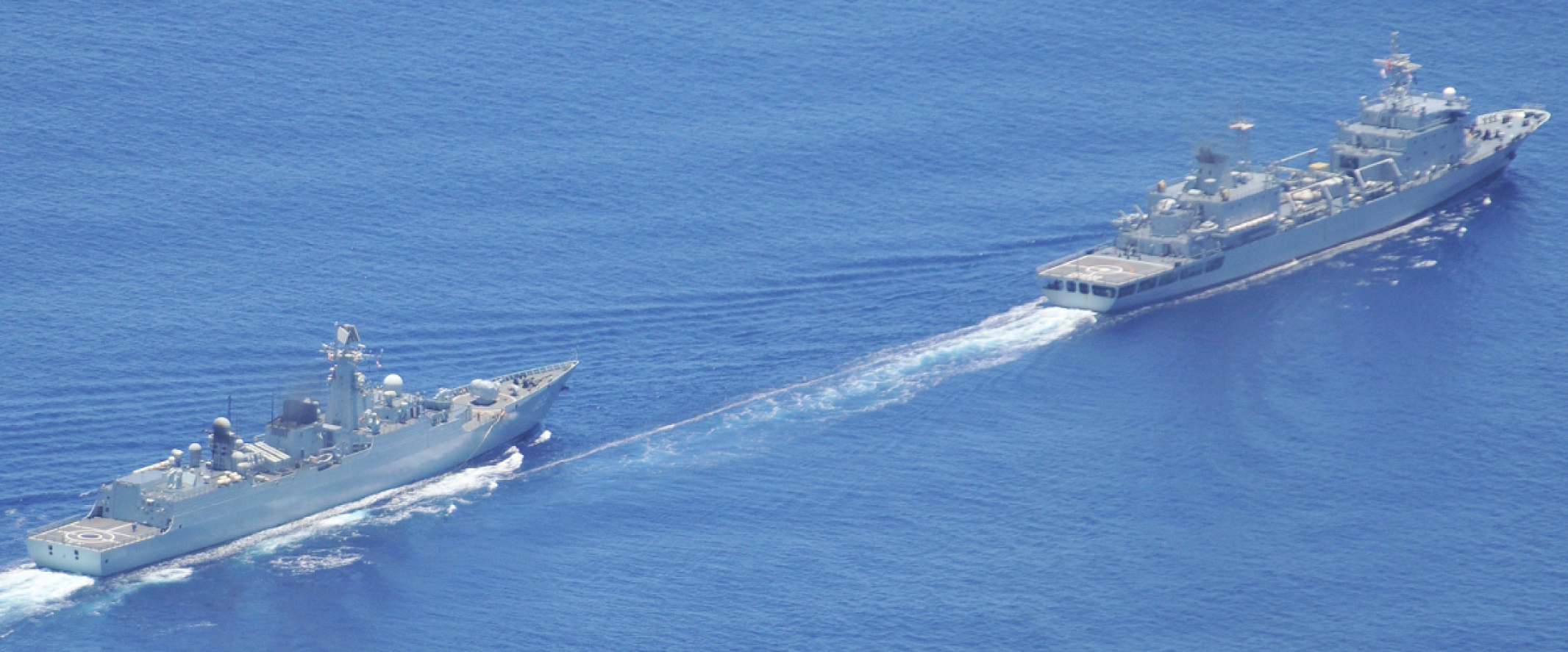
052B in the South China Sea

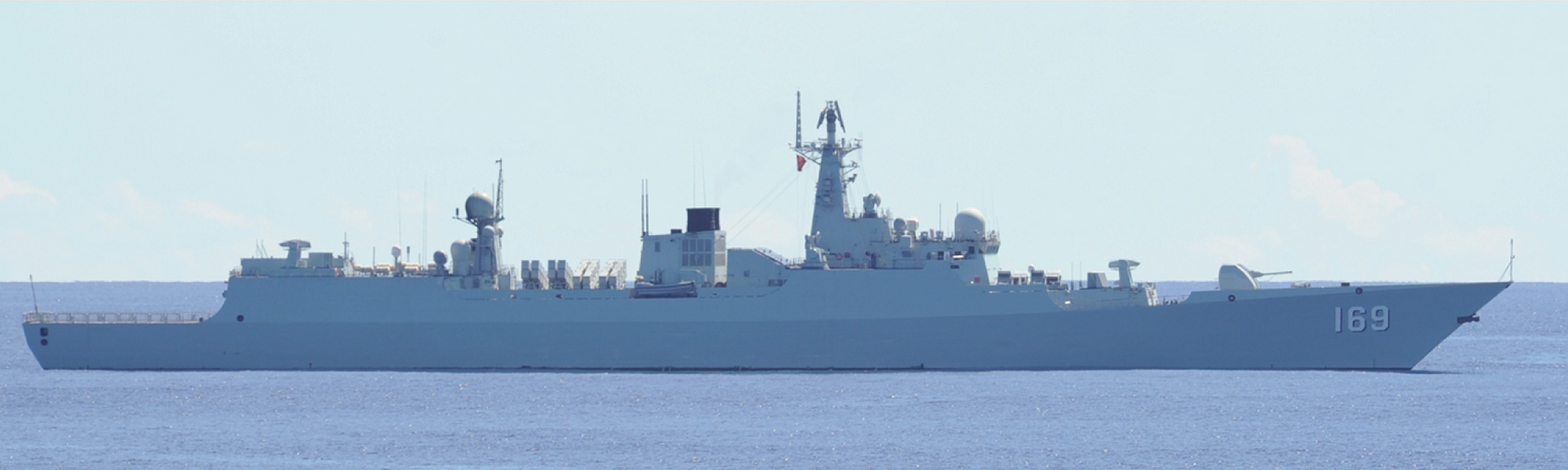
Wuhan (169) in the western Pacific

== See also ==
- List of destroyer classes in service

Equivalent destroyers of the same era

- Takanami class
