= H/PJ-87 100 mm naval gun =

Chinese naval gun

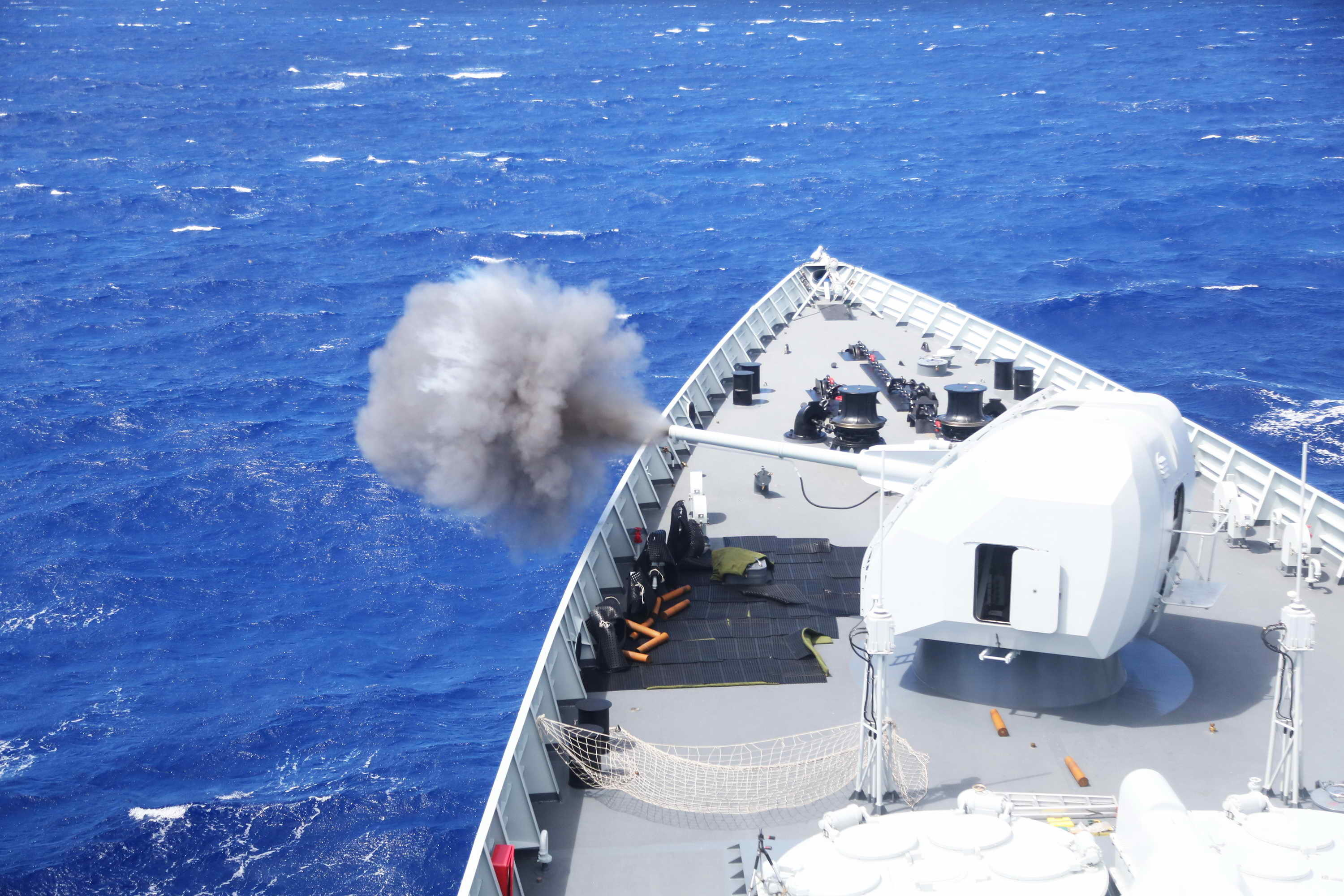
H/PJ-87 on Xi'an

The H/PJ-87 automatic single 100 mm stealth naval gun is the Chinese modification of the Compact model of the French 100 mm naval gun. There are at least two variants, with both sharing similar characteristics with the French weapon. The Type H/PJ-87 100 mm naval gun is a further development of the Type 210, mounted on a stealth modified turret to reduce radar cross-section. H/PJ-87 armed the Type 052B, Type 051C and Type 052C destroyers, latest version of the Type 054A frigate and also the Type 054B frigate.

== Development ==
The initial version of the H/PJ-87 called Type 210. The gun was developed to make the French gun suitable for Chinese deployment. The French gun was incompatible with Soviet and Chinese electronics; it was easier to make the gun compatible with these electronics, and Western electronics, than to alter the electronic suites already aboard warships. Furthermore, the Chinese added the capability to fire laser- and infrared-guided shells; this required changes to the magazine.

The weapon's maximum rate of fire for a single type of unguided round was 90 rounds per minute. The rate of fire was reduced when switching between different types of ammunition.

== See also ==
=== Weapons of comparable role, performance and era ===
- 4.5-inch Mark 8 naval gun: contemporary standard naval gun for British ships
- 5-inch/54-caliber Mark 45 gun: contemporary standard naval gun for US ships
- AK-100: contemporary 100 mm standard naval gun mounting for Russian ships
- French 100 mm naval gun: contemporary standard naval gun for French ships
- Otobreda 127/54 Compact and Otobreda 127/64: contemporary 127 mm naval gun from Italian manufacturer OTO Melara
