= Type 344 radar =

Chinese naval fire control radar

Type 344
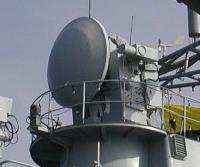
- Type 344 on a Type 052 destroyer
- Country of origin: China
- Manufacturer: CETC 20th Research Institute
- Introduced: c. 1990
- Type: Fire control
- Frequency: I band (NATO)/J band (NATO)
- Range: 25 kilometres (16 mi) (approx.)
- Other names: H/LJP-344

The Type 344 is a Chinese fire-control radar. It integrates optoelectronic tracking and laser ranging systems. It tracks two targets simultaneously.

It was the standard fire control radar on People's Liberation Army Navy destroyers when introduced.

== Variants ==
Type 344
MR34
Export variant.

== See also ==
- List of radars § China

== Sources ==
- Hundman, Eric (March 2025). China's Air Defense Radar Industrial Base. China Aerospace Studies Institute (Report).
