= Chinese destroyer Zhengzhou =

Type 025C destroyer of the PLA Navy

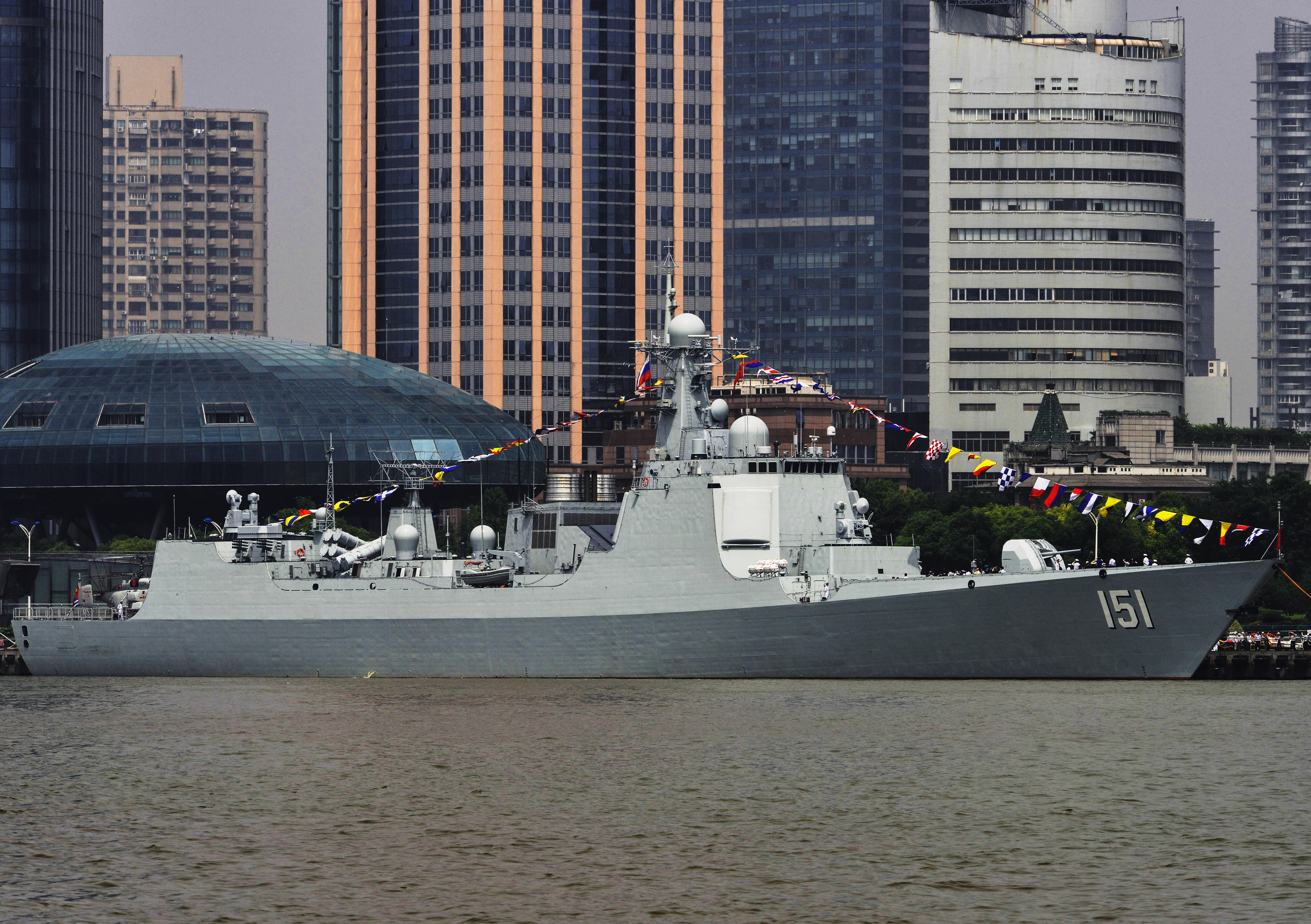
- Zhengzhou on 26 May 2014

History

China
- Name: Zhengzhou
- Namesake: Zhengzhou; (郑州)
- Builder: Jiangnan Shipyard, Shanghai
- Laid down: 16 December 2008
- Launched: 25 June 2011
- Commissioned: 26 December 2013
- Home port: Zhoushan
- Identification: Pennant number: 151
- Status: Active

General characteristics
- Class & type: Type 052C destroyer
- Displacement: 7,000 tons
- Length: 155 m (508 ft 6 in)
- Beam: 17 m (55 ft 9 in)
- Draught: 6 m (19 ft 8 in)
- Propulsion: Combined diesel or gas; 2 x DA80 gas turbines (35.7 MW each); 2 x MTU 20V 956TB92 diesels (6 MW each)
- Speed: 29 knots (54 km/h; 33 mph)
- Range: 4,500 nautical miles (8,300 km; 5,200 mi) at 15 knots
- Complement: 280
- Sensors & processing systems: Type 346 radar (air search, fire control); Type 517 radar (air search); Type 364 radar (air and surface search); Type 344 radar (main gun fire control); Type 347G(2) radar (Type 730 fire control); Type 366 radar (YJ-62 fire control); Bow mounted sonar
- Electronic warfare & decoys: NRJ-6A
- Armament: 48 HHQ-9 surface-to-air missiles; 8 YJ-62 anti-ship cruise missiles; 1 × 100 mm PJ-87 gun; 2 × 30mm Type 730 close-in weapons systems; 6 x torpedo tubes; 4 x multiple rocket launchers (possibly multirole)
- Aircraft carried: 1 helicopter: Kamov Ka-28 or Harbin Z-9
- Aviation facilities: Hangar and helipad

Zhangzhou (151) is a Type 052C destroyer of the People's Liberation Army Navy. She was commissioned on 26 December 2013.

== Development and design ==
The Type 052C appears to share the same basic hull design as the Type 052B destroyer, which in turn is based on the Type 051B destroyer. Stealth features are incorporated. They uses predominantly Chinese systems derived from earlier foreign technology; the preceding Type 052 and Type 052B destroyers used a mixture of Russian and Chinese systems.

The Type 052C propulsion is in the combined diesel or gas (CODOG) arrangement, with two Ukrainian DA80 gas turbines and two MTU 20V 956TB92 diesel engines. The DA80s had blade problems and may have contributed to the last two Type 052Cs sitting pierside at the shipyard for two years without being accepted by the PLAN.

A Kamov Ka-28 or Harbin Z-9 helicopter may operate from the rear hangar and flight deck. The Ka-28 is equipped with a search radar and dipping sonar and can also employ sonobuoys, torpedoes, depth charges, or mines. The Z-9 is a variant of the Airbus Helicopters AS365 Dauphin. The naval variant of the Z-9, the Z-9C, is equipped with the KLC-1 search radar, dipping sonar, and is typically armed with a single, lightweight torpedo. Either helicopter significantly improves the anti-submarine capabilities of the Type 052C.

The main gun is a 100 mm (4 in) PJ-87. The gun suffered from jamming and may have influenced the decision to adopt a different weapon for the Type 052D destroyer. The weapon has a rate of fire of 25 rounds per minute. Close-in defence is provided by two seven-barrel 30 mm (1.2 in) Type 730 CIWS, one mounted forward of the bridge and one atop the hangar. Each gun has a maximum rate of fire of 4200 rounds per minute.

== Construction and career ==
Zhangzhou was launched on 25 June 2011 at the Jiangnan Shipyard in Shanghai. She was commissioned on 26 December 2013.

On May 18, 2014, Zhengzhou, Yantai and Liuzhou, as the first surface ship formation command ship, participated in the Maritime Cooperation 2014 Sino-Russian maritime joint military exercise of the Varyag, Admiral Panteleev and Admiral Nevelsky and other Russian ships at Wusongkou in Shanghai. From May 20th to 26th, the two sides conducted exercises such as ship anchorage defense, joint sea assault and joint anti-submarine. On July 11, 2014, Shanghai held a Navigation Day theme publicity and commemorative event. Zhengzhou and rescue ship Donghai Jiu berthed at the Shanghai Port International Passenger Transport Center Wharf, open to the public to visit. On September 14, 2014, a maritime formation consisting of Zhengzhou and combat support ships, local law enforcement ships, helicopters, and submarines set off for a certain sea area in the East China Sea to carry out the Poseidon 2014 maritime combat support exercise. The exercise supported nine actual combat subjects, including protection of maritime law enforcement forces' rights protection and law enforcement operations, joint military-land search and rescue, opening of maritime emergency channels, and rescue of disabled submarines. On December 12, 2014, Zhengzhou, Taizhou, Zhoushan, Yiyang, Qiandaohu and a Type 815 spy ship. The ships crossed the Miyako Strait into the Western Pacific.

On December 25, 2016, according to a report by the Japanese Integrated Staff and Supervision Department, the Liaoning carrier formation, which is undergoing open sea training, was composed of eight warships. In addition to the aircraft carrier Liaoning, it also includes Zhengzhou, Haikou, Changsha, and a Type 054A guided missile frigate. Yantai, Linyi, Type 054A guided missile frigate Zhuzhou and Type 903A integrated supply ship Gaoyouhu.

On 22 May 2022, the Zhengzhou conducted drills in the East China Sea as a part of the Liaoning Carrier Group; and they were sighted near Miyako Island by the JMSDF.

== Gallery ==
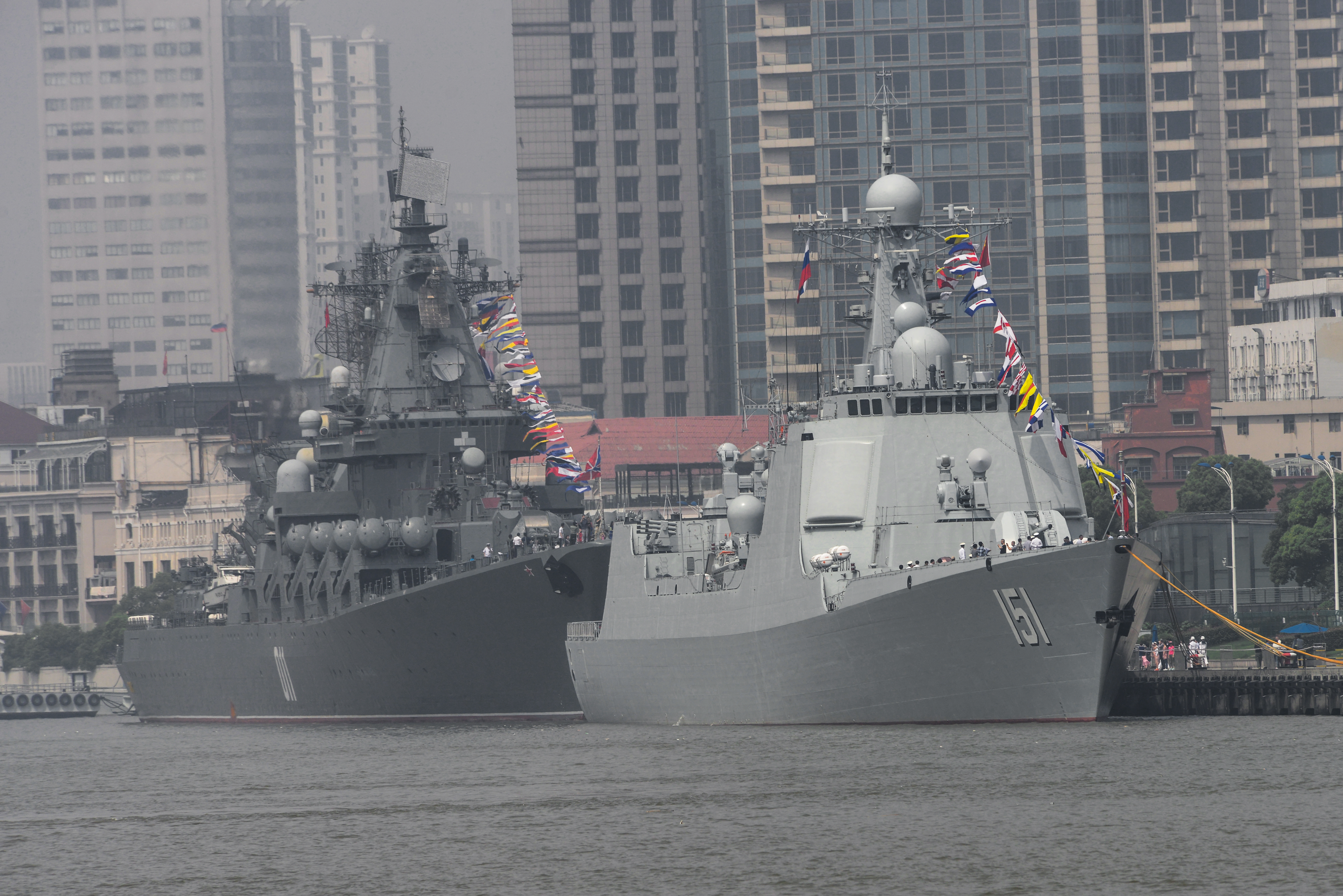
Zhengzhou and Varyag on 26 May 2014.

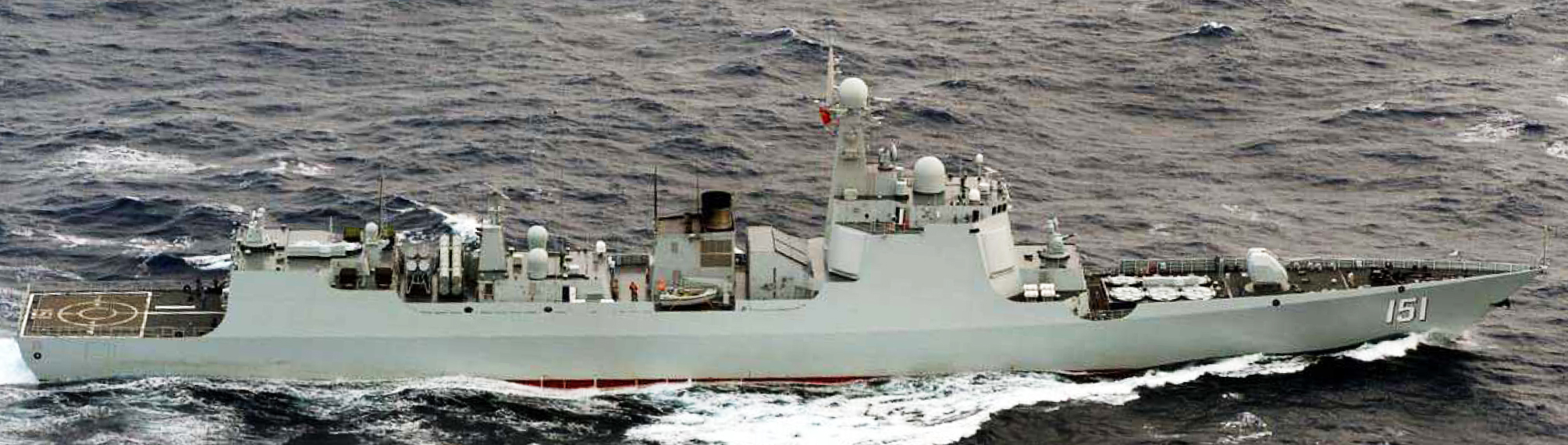
Zhengzhou underway on 12 December 2014.

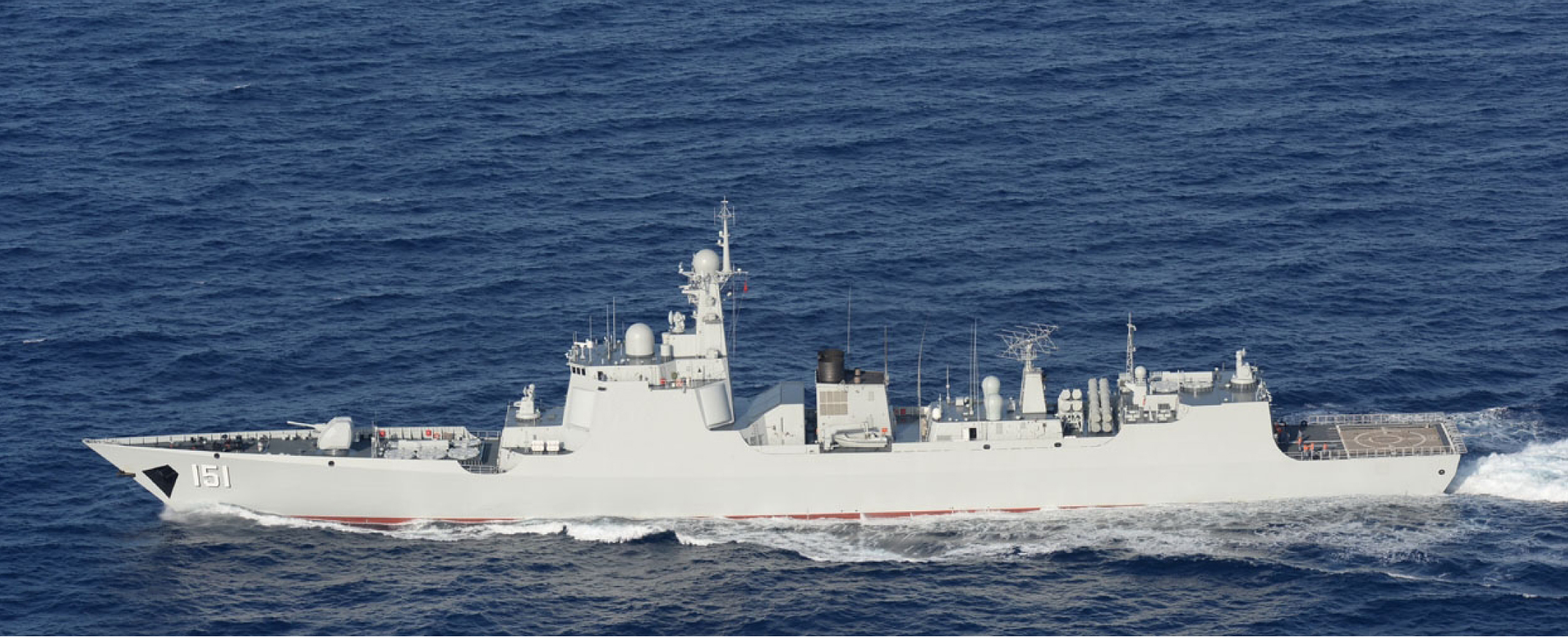
Zhengzhou underway on 12 June 2015.

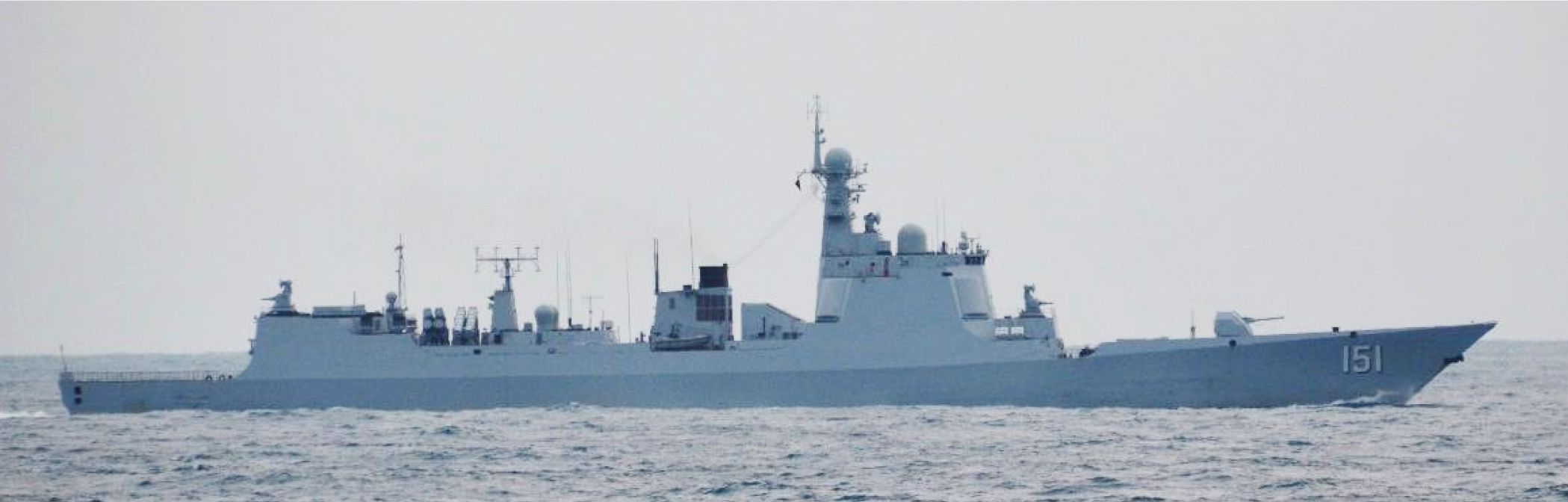
Zhengzhou underway on 25 December 2016.

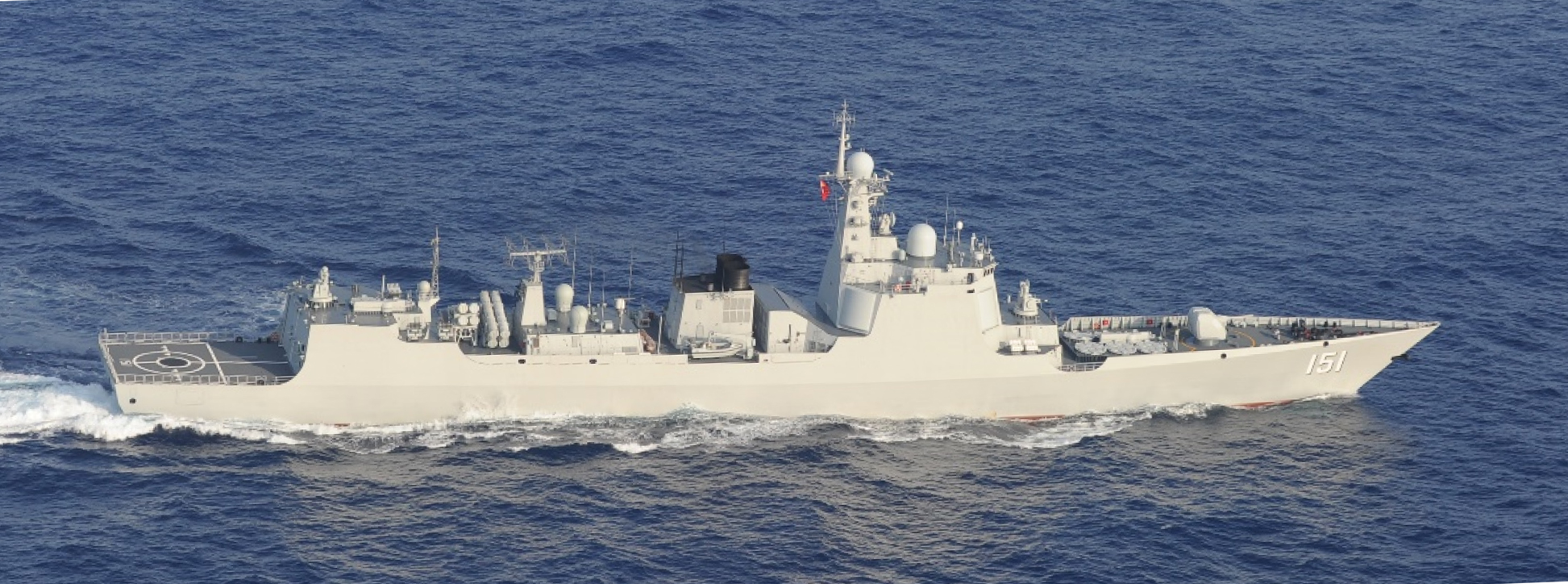
Zhengzhou underway on 20 April 2018.
