= Chinese frigate Zhoushan =

Type 054A frigate of the PLA Navy

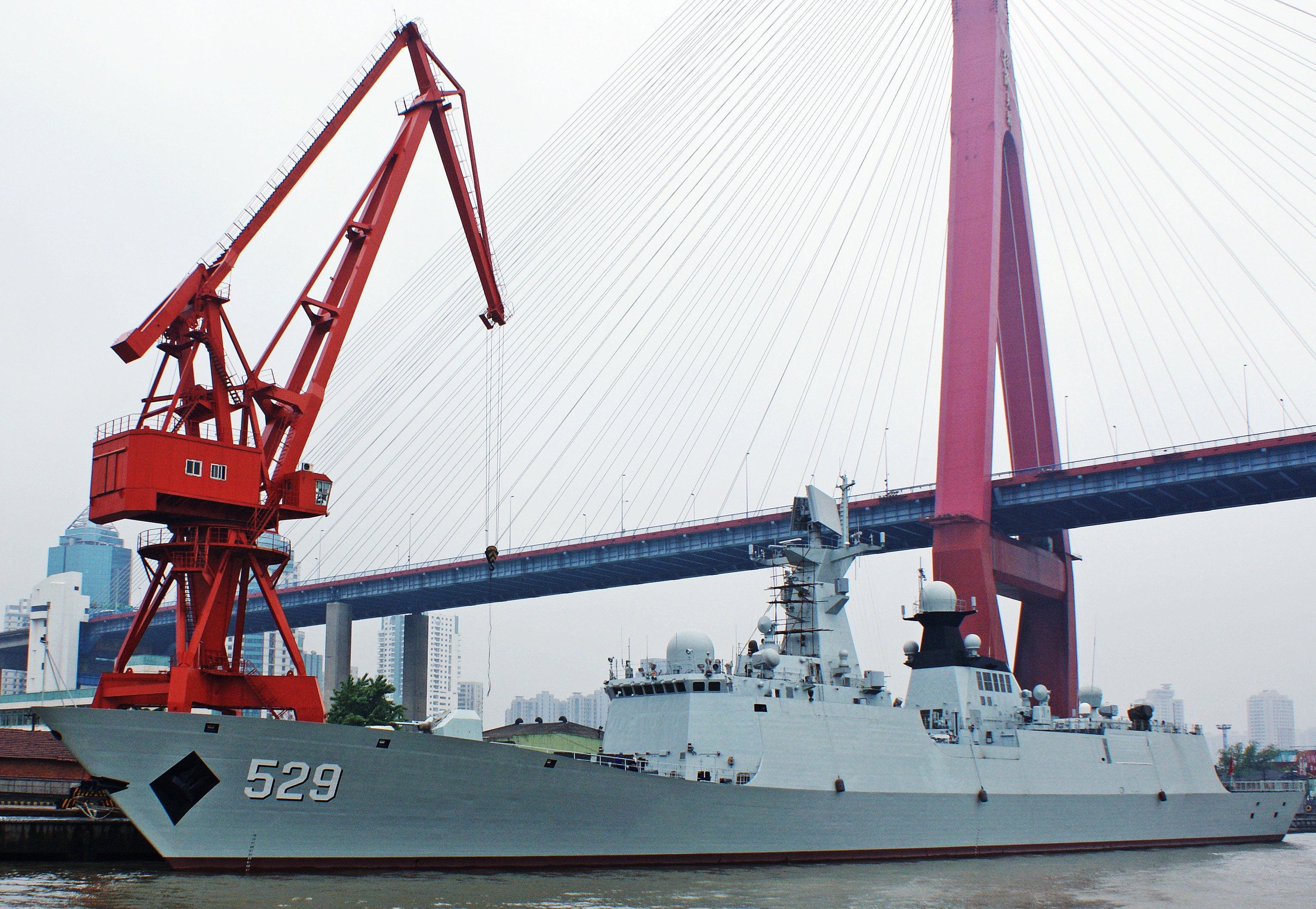
- Zhoushan on 9 May 2013

History

China
- Name: Zhoushan
- Namesake: Zhoushan; (舟山)
- Builder: Hudong–Zhonghua Shipbuilding, Shanghai
- Launched: 19 December 2006
- Commissioned: 3 January 2008
- Home port: Zhoushan
- Identification: Pennant number: 529
- Status: Active

General characteristics
- Class & type: Type 054A frigate
- Displacement: 4,053 tonnes (full)
- Length: 134.1 m (440 ft)
- Beam: 16 m (52 ft)
- Propulsion: CODAD, 4 × Shaanxi 16 PA6 STC diesels, 5700 kW (7600+ hp @ 1084 rpm) each
- Speed: 27 knots estimated
- Range: 8,025 nautical miles (9,235 mi; 14,862 km) estimated
- Complement: 165
- Sensors & processing systems: Type 382 Radar; Type 344 Radar (Mineral-ME Band Stand) OTH target acquisition and SSM fire control radar; 4 × Type 345 Radar(MR-90 Front Dome) SAM fire control radars; MR-36A surface search radar, I-band; Type 347G 76 mm gun fire control radar; 2 × Racal RM-1290 navigation radars, I-band; MGK-335 medium frequency active/passive sonar system; H/SJG-206 towed array sonar; ZKJ-4B/6 (developed from Thomson-CSF TAVITAC) combat data system; HN-900 Data link (Chinese equivalent of Link 11A/B, to be upgraded); SNTI-240 SATCOM; AKD5000S Ku band SATCOM
- Electronic warfare & decoys: Type 922-1 radar warning receiver; HZ-100 ECM & ELINT system; Kashtan-3 missile jamming system
- Armament: 1 × 32-cell VLS; HQ-16 SAM; Yu-8 anti submarine rocket launcher; 2 × 4 C-803 anti-ship / land attack cruise missiles; 1 × PJ26 76 mm dual purpose gun; 2 × Type 730 7-barrel 30 mm CIWS guns or Type 1130; 2 × 3 324mm Yu-7 ASW torpedo launchers; 2 × 6 Type 87 240mm anti-submarine rocket launcher (36 rockets carried); 2 × Type 726-4 18-tube decoy rocket launchers
- Aircraft carried: 1 Kamov Ka-28 'Helix' or Harbin Z-9C
- Aviation facilities: hangar

Zhoushan (529) is a Type 054A frigate of the People's Liberation Army Navy. She was commissioned on 3 January 2008.

== Development and design ==
The Type 054A carries HQ-16 medium-range air defence missiles and anti-submarine missiles in a vertical launching system (VLS) system. The HQ-16 has a range of up to 50 km, with superior range and engagement angles to the Type 054's HQ-7. The Type 054A's VLS uses a hot launch method; a shared common exhaust system is sited between the two rows of rectangular launching tubes.

The four AK-630 close-in weapon systems (CIWS) of the Type 054 were replaced with two Type 730 CIWS on the Type 054A. The autonomous Type 730 provides improved reaction time against close-in threats.

== Construction and career ==
Zhoushan was launched on 19 December 2006 at the Hudong-Zhonghua Shipyard in Shanghai. She was commissioned on 3 January 2008.

On July 16, 2009, Zhoushan, Xuzhou and Qiandaohu formed the third batch of the Chinese navy escort fleet, which set sail from Zhoushan, Zhejiang Province, to the Gulf of Aden and Somalia for escort missions in the sea. The escort lasted 158 days. After completing 53 escort missions and safely escorting 582 Chinese and foreign ships, the formation returned to a military port in Zhoushan, Zhejiang Province on December 20, 2009. Zhoushan and others visited Singapore and Malaysia on the return voyage, and docked in Hong Kong from December 14th to 17th, and received more than 7,000 people from all walks of life in Hong Kong.

On November 2, 2010, Zhoushan, Xuzhou and Qiandaohu formed the seventh batch of the Chinese navy escort fleet, which set sail from Zhoushan, Zhejiang Province, to the Gulf of Aden and Somalia Perform escort missions in the sea. The escort experienced 189 days and nights and a cumulative voyage of more than 110,000 nautical miles. Zhoushan and others are safely escorting 38 batches of 578 Chinese and foreign ships, escorting 1 ship attacked by pirates, rescued 1 ship attacked by pirates boarding, rescued 9 ships pursued by pirates 6 times, verified and driven away 218 suspicious ships After the second time, she returned to China on May 9, 2011. During the escort period, the formation successively met and exchanged with the commanders of the NATO 508 task force and the EU 465 task force. After completing the escort mission, Zhoushan also visited three African countries including Tanzania, South Africa, and Seychelles, and docked in Singapore.

On December 12, 2014, Zhoushan, Taizhou, Zhengzhou, Yiyang, Qiandaohu and the electronic reconnaissance ship Beijixing The ship crossed the Miyako Strait into the Western Pacific.

== Gallery ==
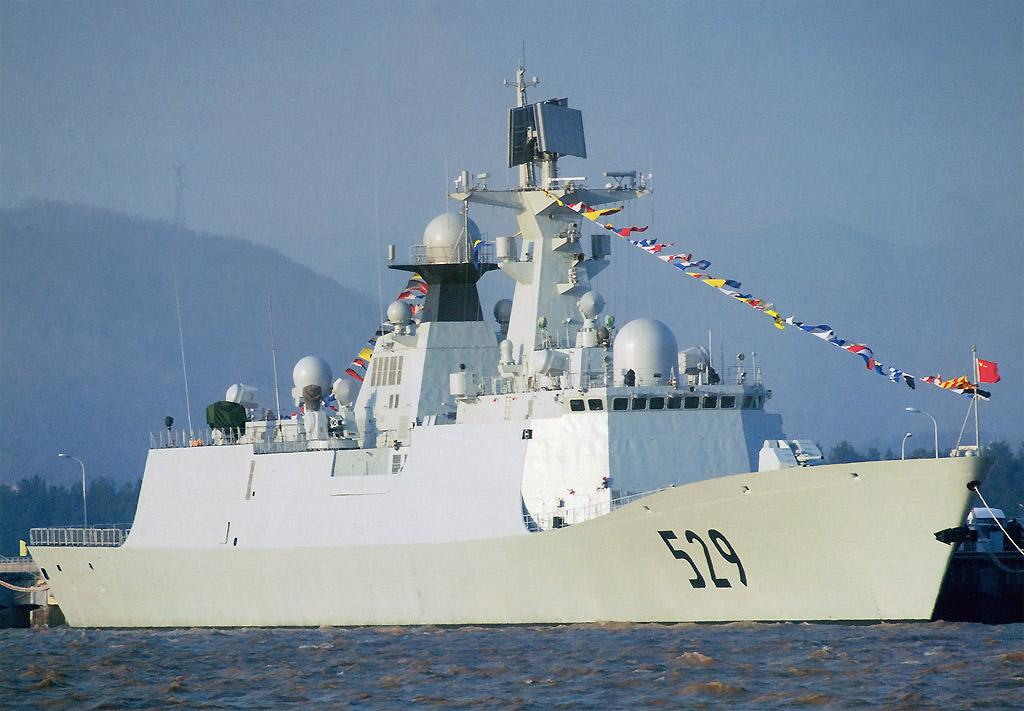
Zhoushan on 19 May 2008.

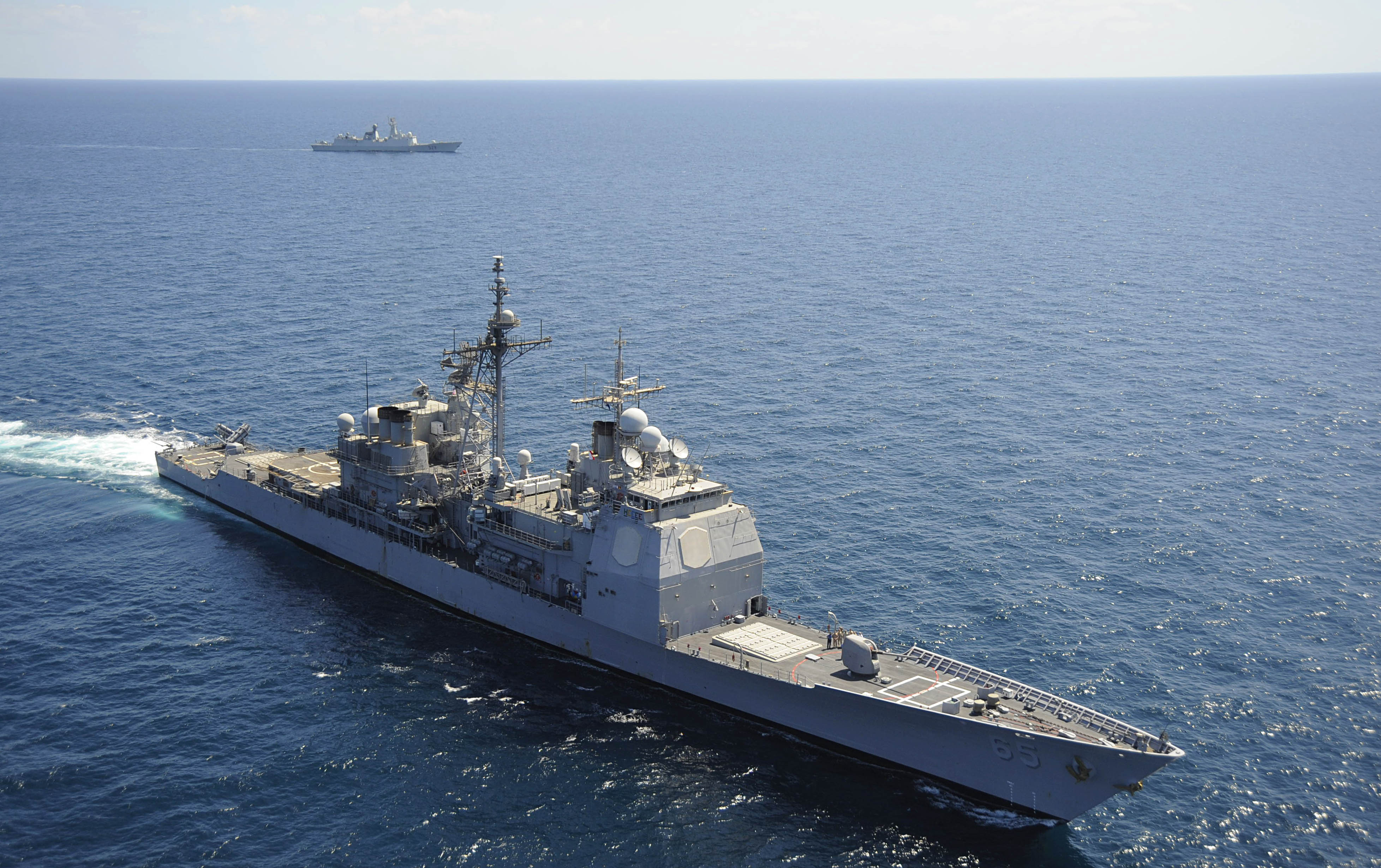
Zhoushan underway with USS Chosin on 19 November 2009.

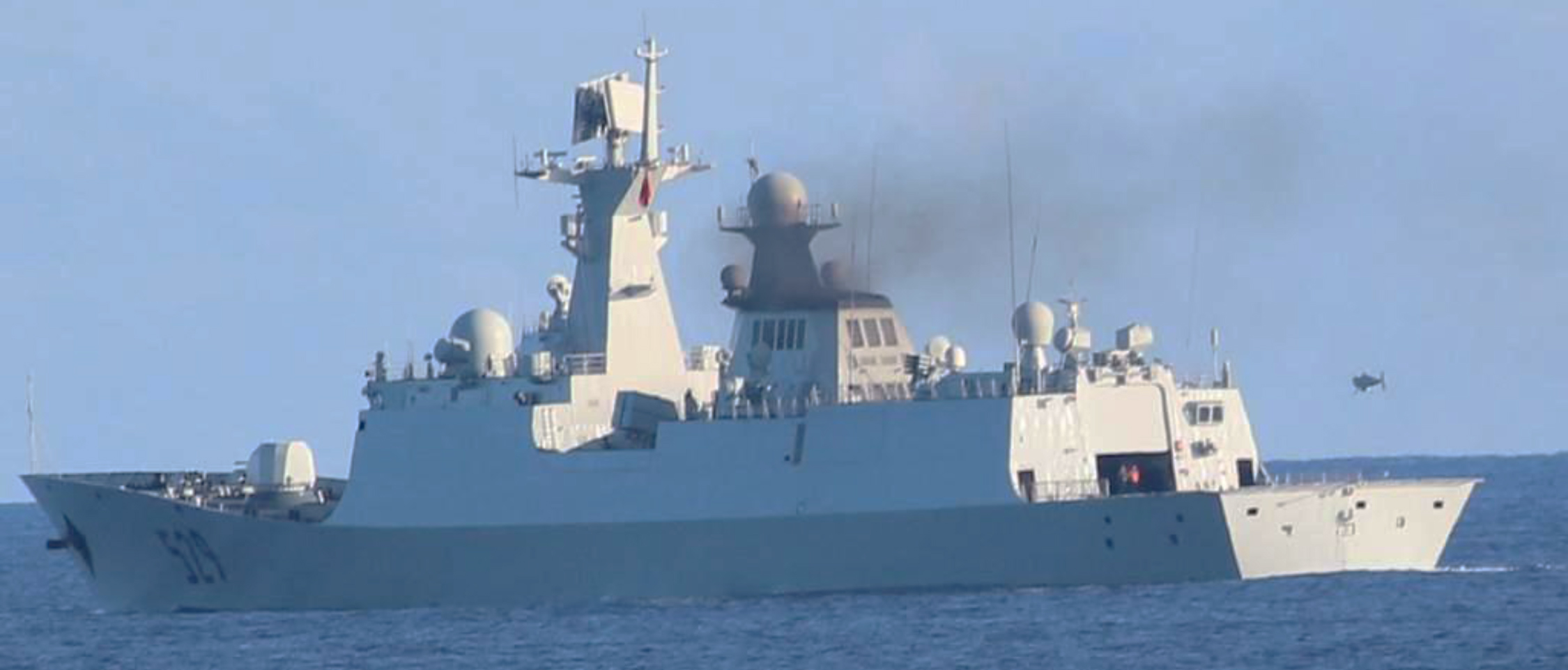
Zhoushan underway on 14 May 2012.

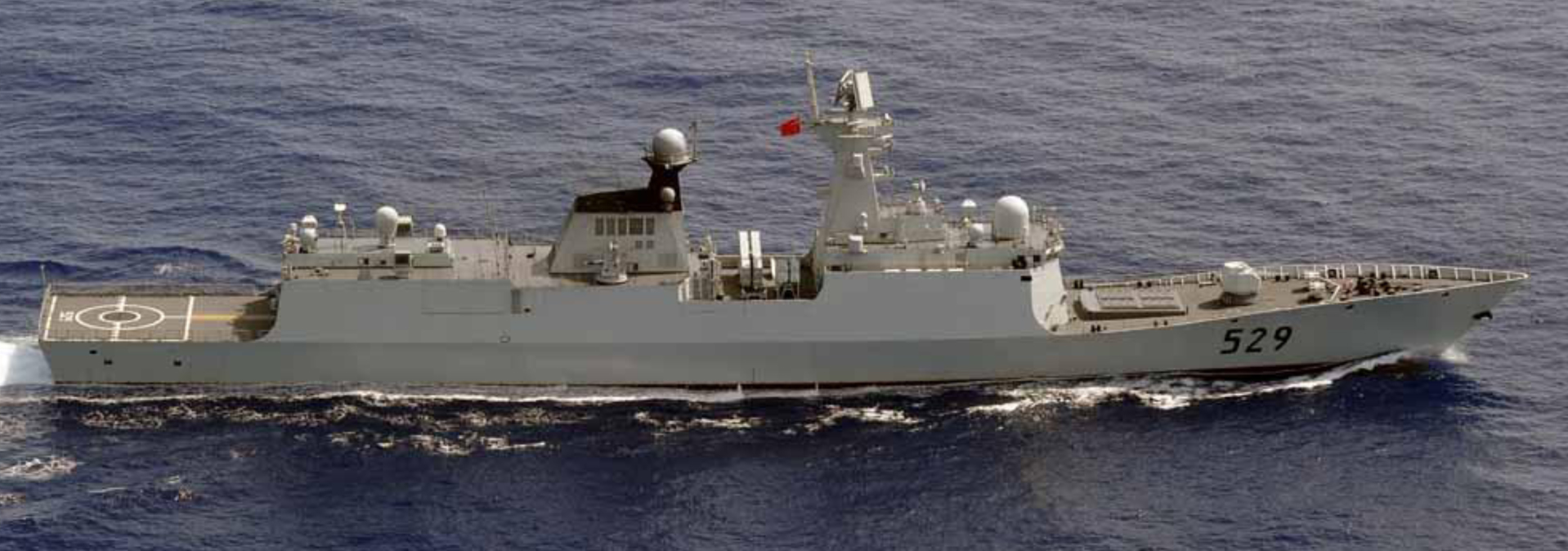
Zhoushan underway on 14 May 2012.

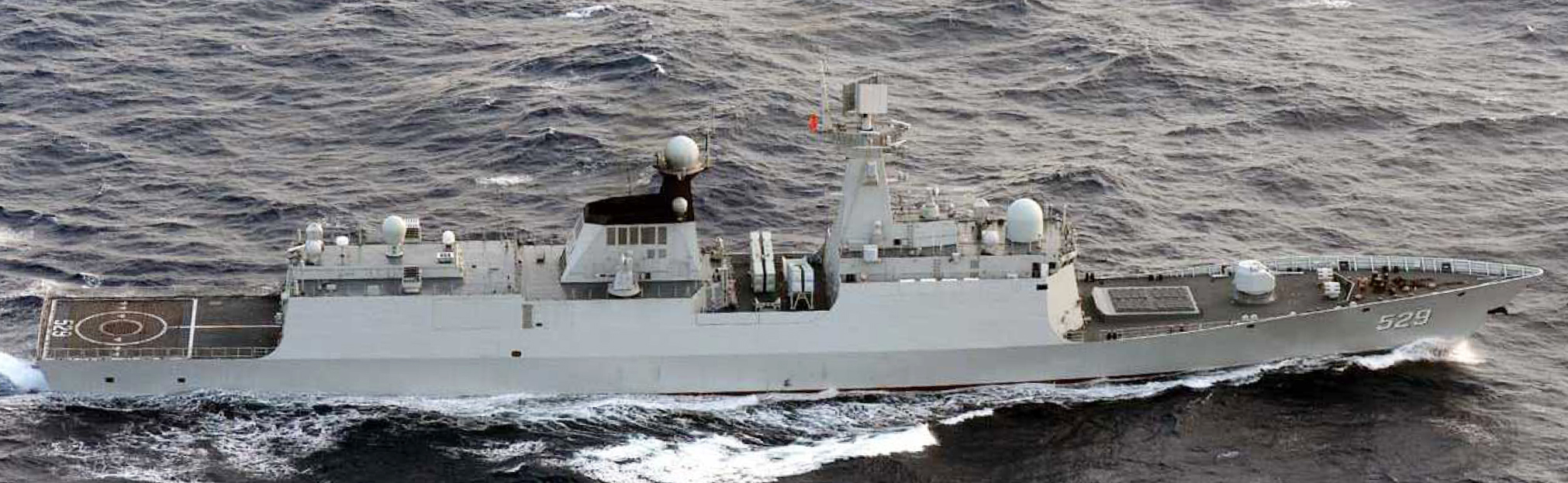
Zhoushan underway on 12 December 2014.

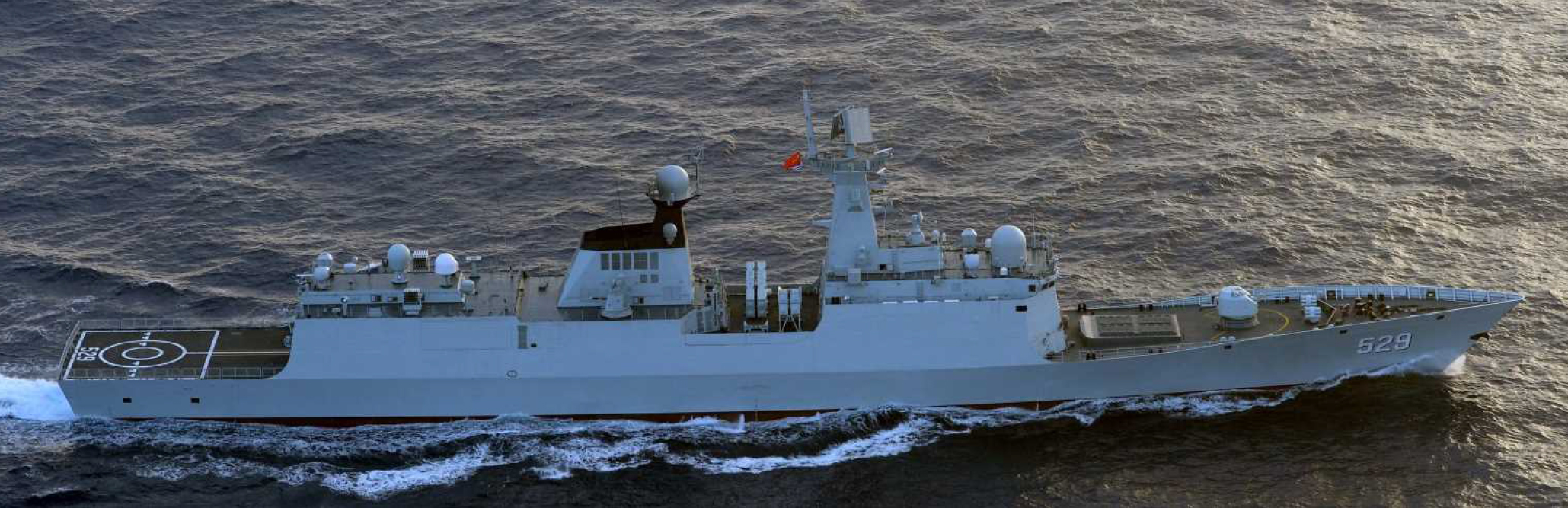
Zhoushan underway on 9 April 2016.

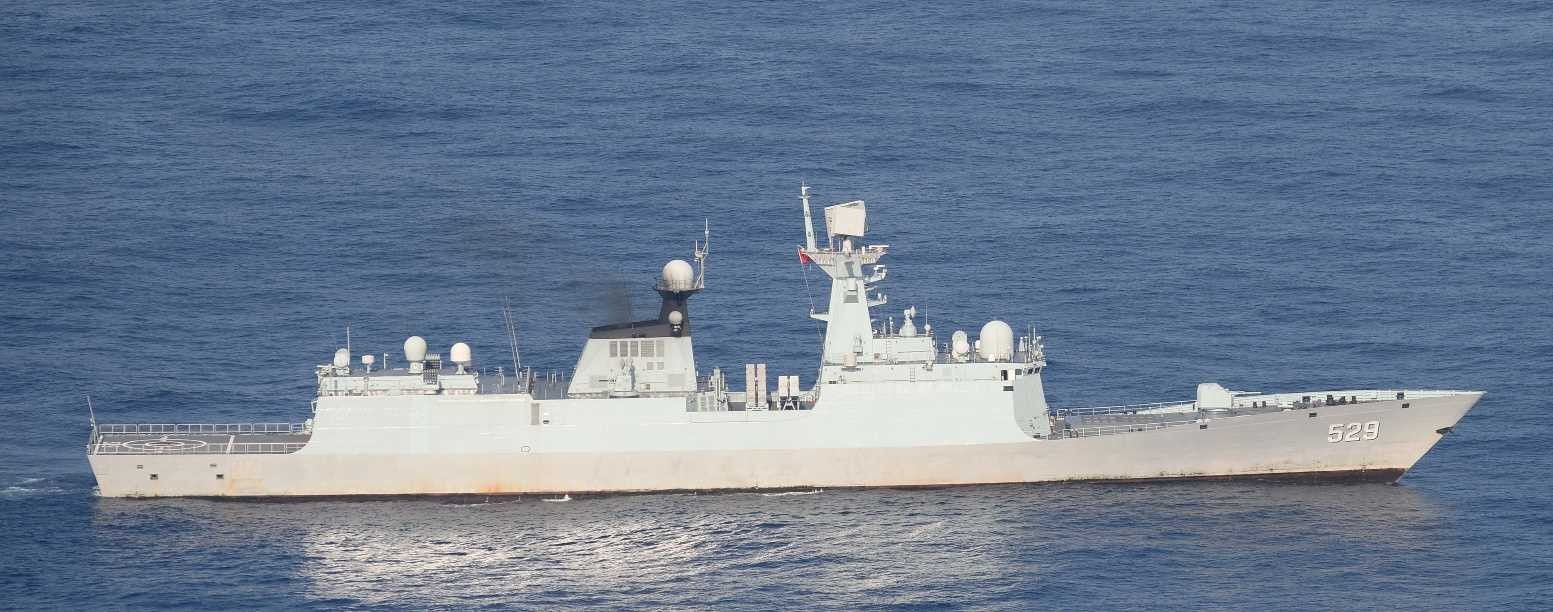
Zhoushan underway on 17 June 2019.
