= Chinese ship Taizhou =

A number of vessels of the People's Liberation Army Navy have borne the name Taizhou, after the city of Taizhou.

- Chinese frigate Taizhou (533), a Type 053H1 frigate. In service from 1982 until 2019. Renamed from Ningbo in 2003.
- Chinese destroyer Taizhou (138), a Type 956EM destroyer, in service since 2005.
