= Chinese destroyer Hangzhou =

Type 956E destroyer of the People's Liberation Army Navy

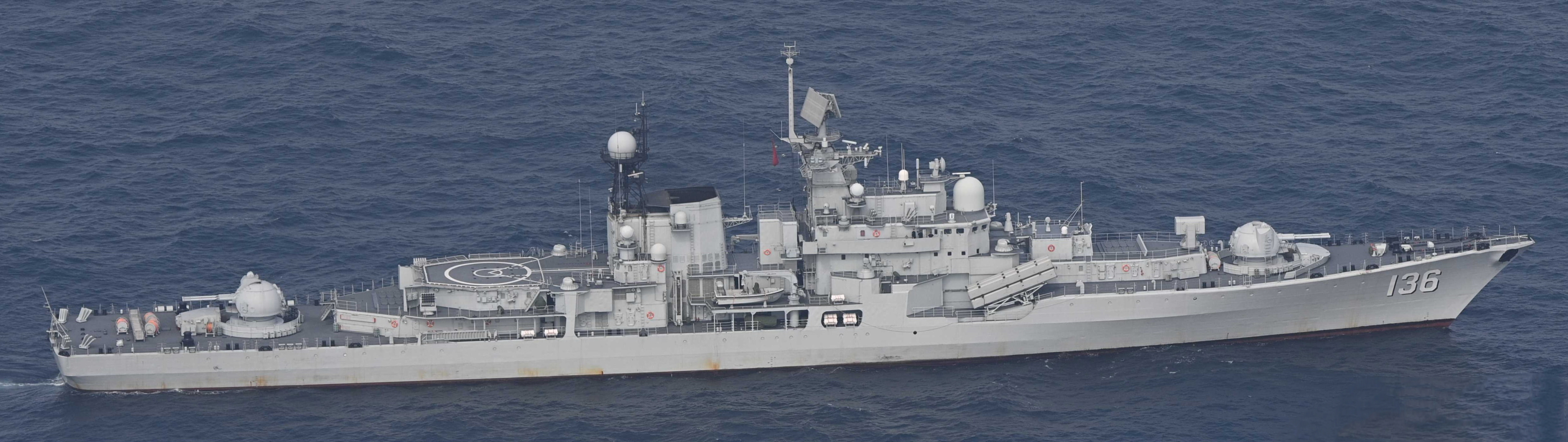
- Refitted and modernized Hangzhou on 20 February 2023

History

China
- Name: Hangzhou; (杭州)
- Namesake: Hangzhou; Vazhnyy
- Builder: Severnaya Verf, Saint Petersburg
- Laid down: 4 November 1988
- Launched: 27 May 1994
- Commissioned: 25 December 1999
- Renamed: from Vazhnyy; (Важный)
- Home port: Zhoushan
- Identification: Pennant number: 136
- Status: Active

General characteristics
- Class & type: Type 956E destroyer
- Displacement: 6,600 tons standard, 8,480 tons full load
- Length: 156 m (511 ft 10 in)
- Beam: 17.3 m (56 ft 9 in)
- Draught: 6.5 m (21 ft 4 in)
- Propulsion: 2 shaft steam turbines, 4 boilers, 75,000 kW (100,000 hp), 2 fixed propellers, 2 turbo generators, and 2 diesel generators
- Speed: 32.7 knots (60.6 km/h; 37.6 mph)
- Range: 3,920 nmi (7,260 km; 4,510 mi) at 18 knots (33 km/h; 21 mph); 1,345 nmi (2,491 km; 1,548 mi) at 33 knots (61 km/h; 38 mph)
- Complement: 350
- Sensors & processing systems: Radar: Air target acquisition radar, 3 × navigation radars, 130 mm gun fire-control radars, 30 mm air-defence gun fire control radar; Sonar: Active and passive under-keel sonar; ES: Tactical situation plotting board, anti-ship missile fire control system, air defence, missile fire-control system, and torpedo fire control system
- Electronic warfare & decoys: After modernization: 48 (2 × 24) H/RJZ-726-4A 24 barrel decoy dispenser; 72 (8 × 9) 9 barrel decoy dispenser; Replaced during modernization: 2 twin barrel PK-2 decoy dispensers (200 rocket decoys)
- Armament: After modernization: 2 dual AK-130 130 mm naval guns; 4 × 30 mm AK-630 gun-based CIWS (6 barreled rotary gun); 1 × HHQ-10 SAM-based CIWS (24-cell launcher); 8 (2 × 4) YJ-12 anti-ship missiles; 32 cell (2 x 16) vertical launching systems (VLS) for HQ-16 surface to air missiles (SAM) and Yu-8 anti-submarine missiles; 6 (2 × 3) 324 mm torpedo tubes; Weapens replaced during modernization: 8 (2 × 4) (SS-N-22 'Sunburn') anti-ship missiles; 2 single-arm launchers for 48 (2 × 24) SA-N-7 'Gadfly' (navalised Buk) surface-to-air missiles; 2 × 2 533 mm torpedo tubes; 2 × 6 RBU-1000 300 mm anti-submarine rocket launchers
- Aircraft carried: 1× Ka-27 series helicopter
- Aviation facilities: Helipad

Hangzhou (136) is a Type 956E destroyer of the People's Liberation Army Navy.

== Development and design ==
The project began in the late 1960s when it was becoming obvious to the Soviet Navy that naval guns still had an important role particularly in support of amphibious landings, but existing gun cruisers and destroyers were showing their age. A new design was started, employing a new 130 mm automatic gun turret.

The ships were 156 metres (512 ft) in length, with a beam of 17.3 metres (56 ft 9 in) and a draught of 6.5 metres (21 ft 4 in).

The Chinese People's Liberation Army Navy Surface Force (PLAN) had two modified Sovremenny-class destroyers delivered in December 1999 and November 2000. In 2002, the PLAN ordered two improved versions designated 956-EM. The first vessel was launched in late 2005, while the second was launched in 2006. All four vessels were commissioned to the East Sea Fleet.

Project cost: 600 million US$ (mid-1990s price) was the price paid for Project 956A (two ships), and 1.4 billion US$ (early-2000s price) for Project 956EM (two ships).

== Construction and career ==
Hangzhou was laid down on 4 November 1988 and launched on 27 May 1994 by Severnaya Verf in Saint Petersburg. She was commissioned on 25 December 1999.

As of 2016, Hangzhou was reported to be undergoing refit with its original components replaced with domestic systems. In addition to replacement of electronics and sensors, armament upgrades include replacing 2x4 3M80E Moskit anti-ship missiles with 2x4 YJ-12A supersonic missiles, swapping two launchers for 48 SA-N-12 SAMs with 4 sets of 8-cell vertical launch systems totaling 32 cells for HQ-16C or Yu-8 anti-submarine missiles and adding a 24-cell FL-3000N short-range anti-air missiles.

On 29 March 2021, Taizhou, Hangzhou and Suzhou of the East Sea Fleet conducted a live firing exercise.
