= Chinese frigate Linyi =

Type 054A frigate of the PLA Navy

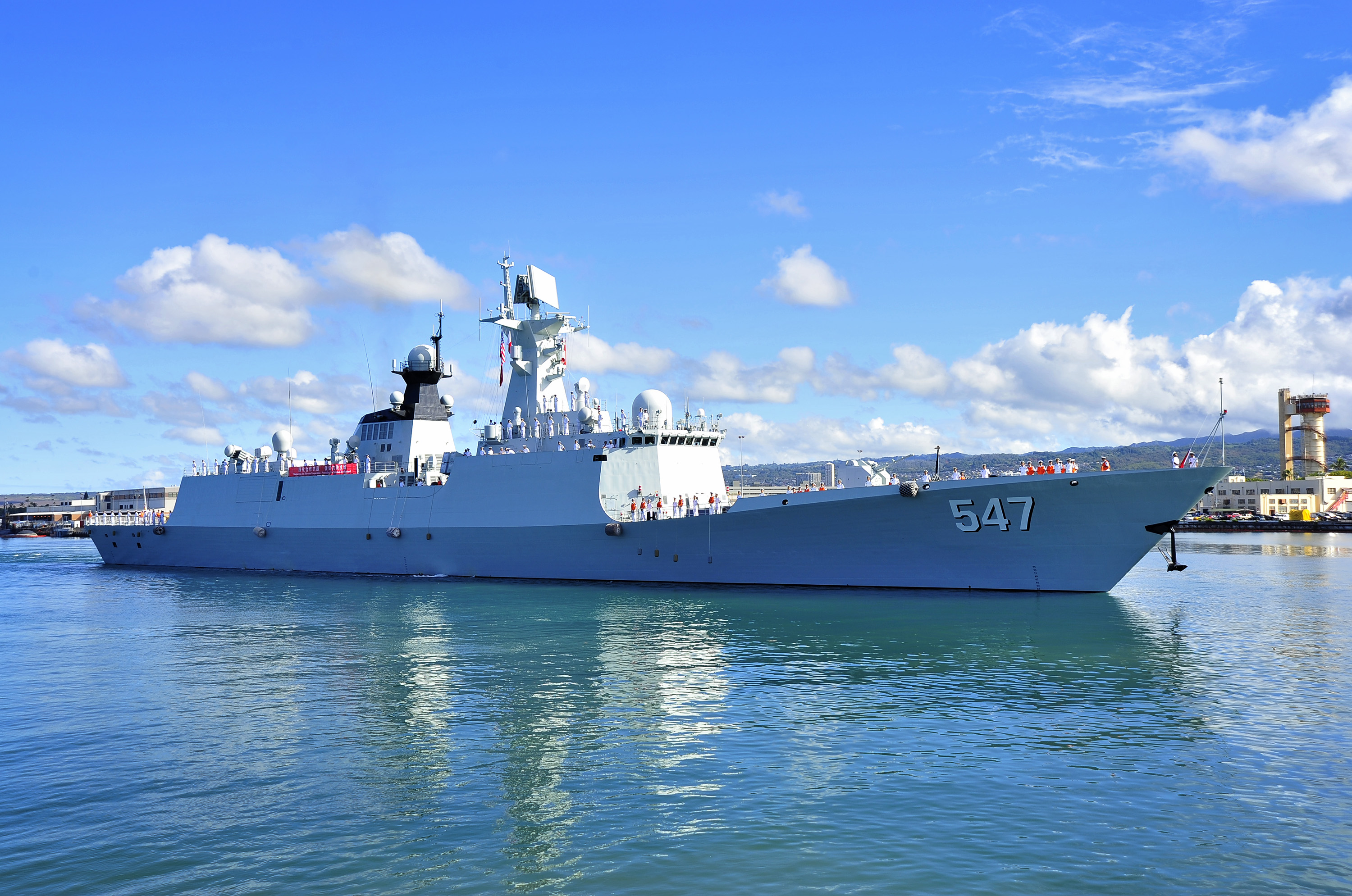
- Linyi entering Pearl Harbor on 6 September 2013

History

China
- Name: Linyi
- Namesake: Linyi; (临沂)
- Builder: Huangpu, Shanghai
- Launched: December 2011
- Commissioned: 22 December 2012
- Identification: Pennant number: 547
- Status: Active

General characteristics
- Class & type: Type 054A frigate
- Displacement: 4,053 tonnes (full)
- Length: 134.1 m (440 ft)
- Beam: 16 m (52 ft)
- Propulsion: CODAD, 4 × Shaanxi 16 PA6 STC diesels, 5700 kW (7600+ hp @ 1084 rpm) each
- Speed: 27 knots (50 km/h) estimated
- Range: 8,025 nautical miles (9,235 mi; 14,862 km) estimated
- Complement: 165
- Sensors & processing systems: Type 382 Radar; Type 344 Radar (Mineral-ME Band Stand) OTH target acquisition and SSM fire control radar; 4 × Type 345 Radar(MR-90 Front Dome) SAM fire control radars; MR-36A surface search radar, I-band; Type 347G 76 mm gun fire control radar; 2 × Racal RM-1290 navigation radars, I-band; MGK-335 medium frequency active/passive sonar system; H/SJG-206 towed array sonar; ZKJ-4B/6 (developed from Thomson-CSF TAVITAC) combat data system; HN-900 Data link (Chinese equivalent of Link 11A/B, to be upgraded); SNTI-240 SATCOM; AKD5000S Ku band SATCOM
- Electronic warfare & decoys: Type 922-1 radar warning receiver; HZ-100 ECM & ELINT system; Kashtan-3 missile jamming system
- Armament: 1 × 32-cell VLS; HQ-16 SAM; Yu-8 anti submarine rocket launcher; 2 × 4 C-803 anti-ship / land attack cruise missiles; 1 × PJ26 76 mm dual-purpose gun; 2 × Type 730 7-barrel 30 mm CIWS guns or Type 1130; 2 × 3 324mm Yu-7 ASW torpedo launchers; 2 × 6 Type 87 240mm anti-submarine rocket launcher (36 rockets carried); 2 × Type 726-4 18-tube decoy rocket launchers
- Aircraft carried: 1 Kamov Ka-28 'Helix' or Harbin Z-9C
- Aviation facilities: hangar

Linyi (547) is a Type 054A frigate of the People's Liberation Army Navy. She was commissioned on 22 December 2012.

== Development and design ==
The Type 054A carries HQ-16 medium-range air defence missiles and anti-submarine missiles in a vertical launching system (VLS). The HQ-16 has a range of up to 50 km, and superior range and engagement angles to the Type 054's HQ-7. The Type 054A's VLS uses a hot launch method; a shared standard exhaust system is sited between the two rows of rectangular launching tubes.

The four AK-630 close-in weapon systems (CIWS) of Type 054 were replaced with two Type 730 CIWS on Type 054A. The autonomous Type 730 provides improved reaction time against close-in threats.

== Construction and career ==
Linyi was launched in December 2011 at the China State Shipbuilding Corporation in Shanghai. She was commissioned on 22 December 2012.

On 17 August 2015, Taizhou, Linyi, Hengyang, Taihu and Yunwu Shan participated in the Joint Sea 2015 II in the Sea of Japan.

== Gallery ==
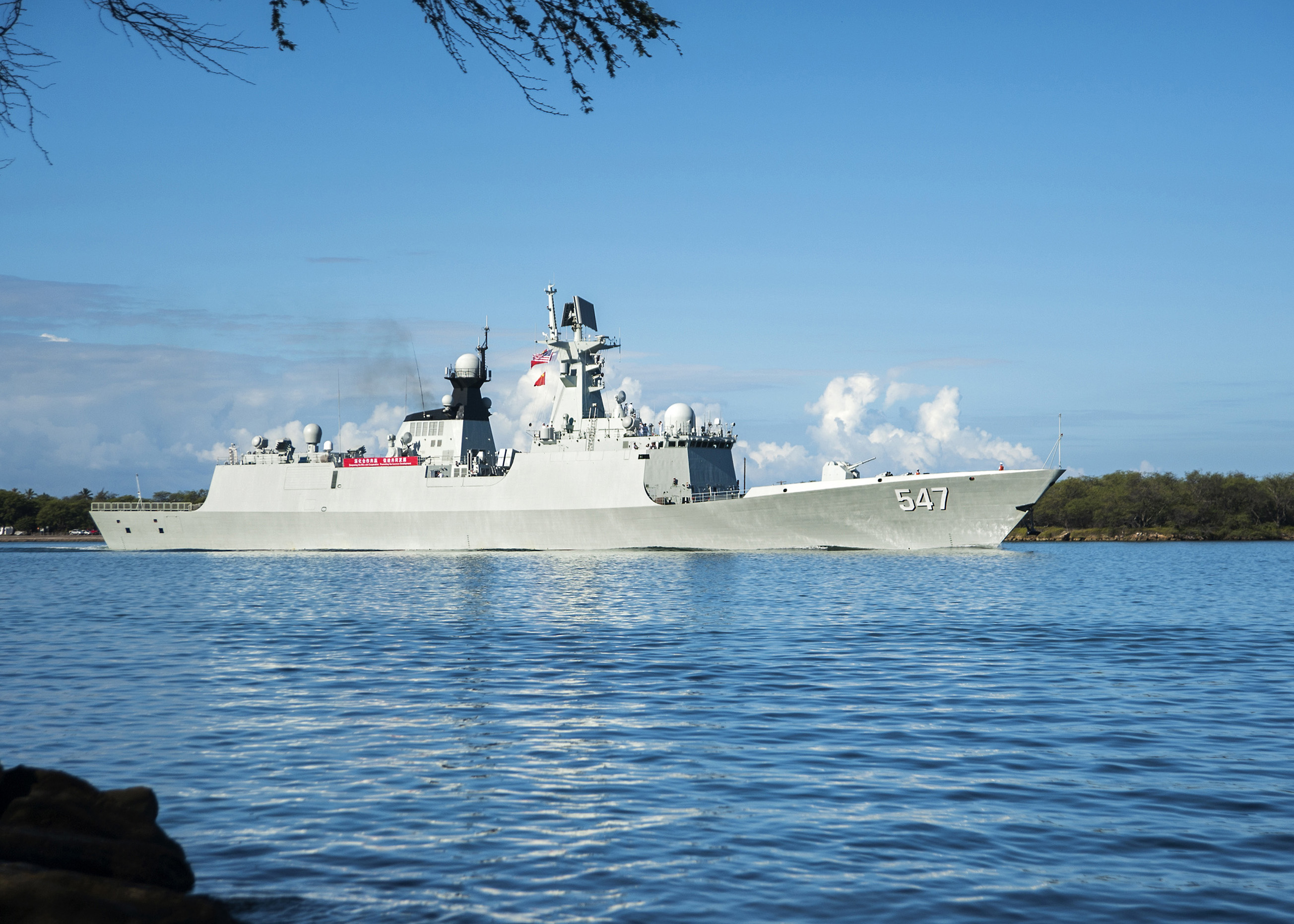
Linyi entering Pearl Harbor on 6 September 2013.

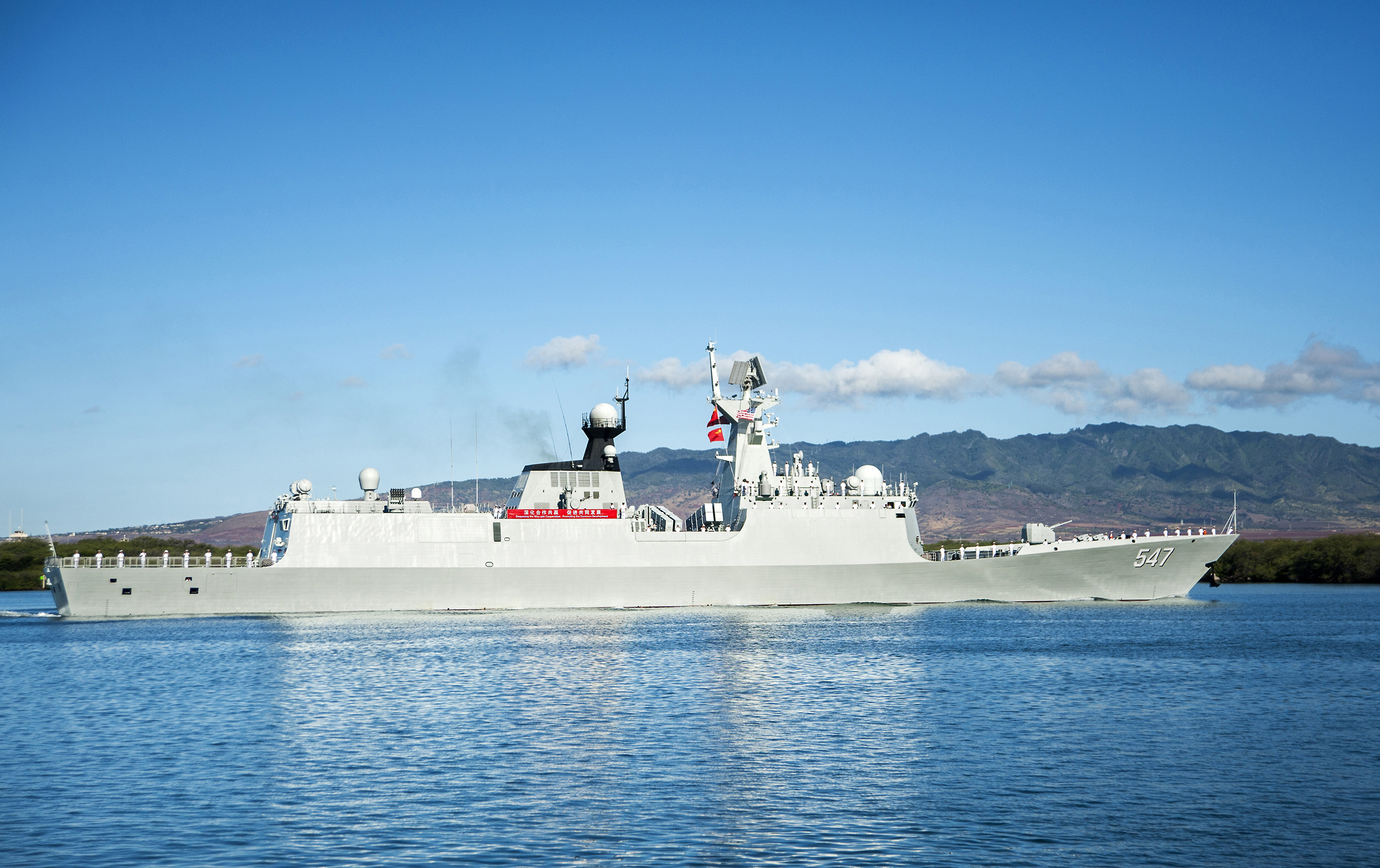
Linyi entering Pearl Harbor on 6 September 2013.

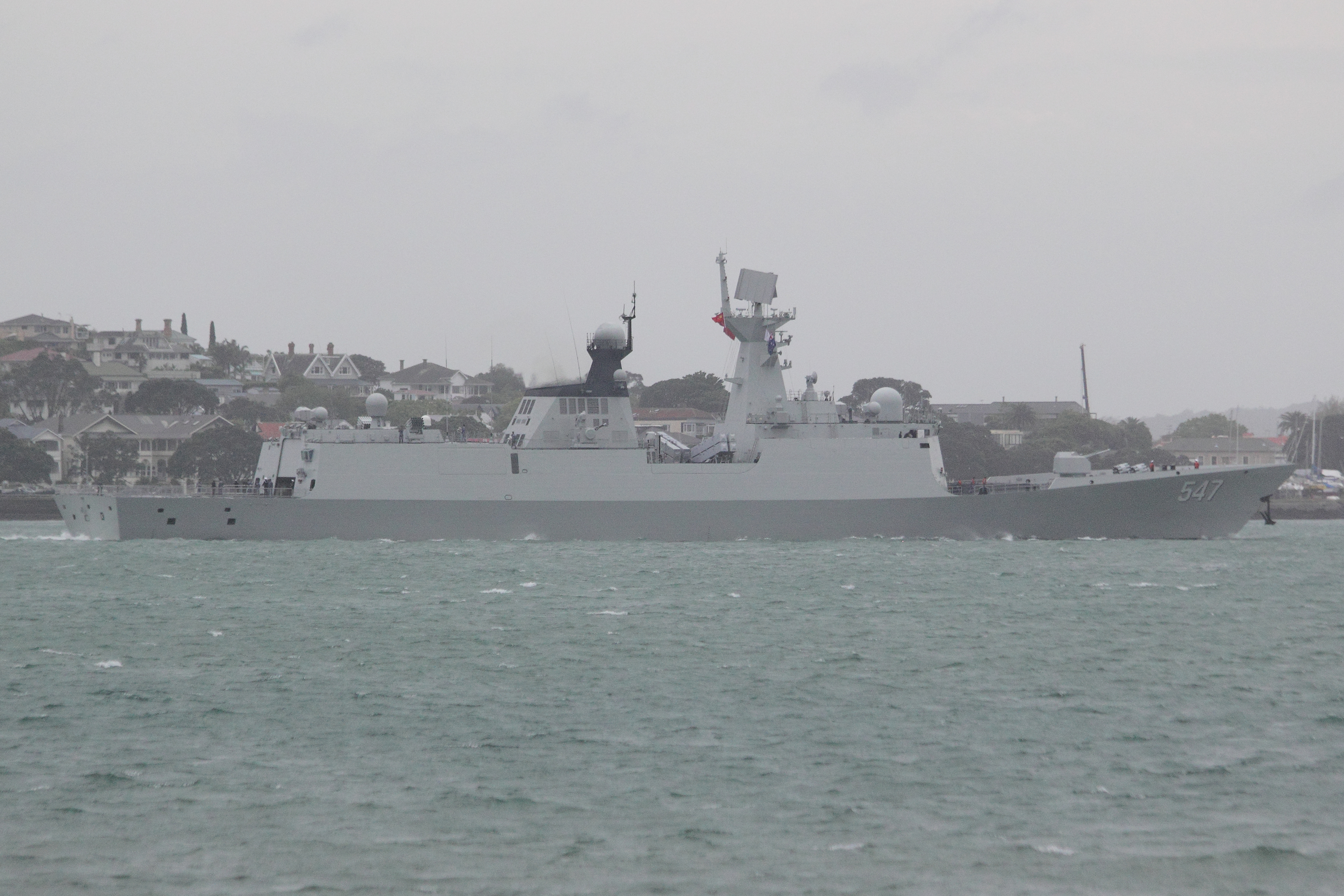
Linyi entering Auckland on 15 October 2013.

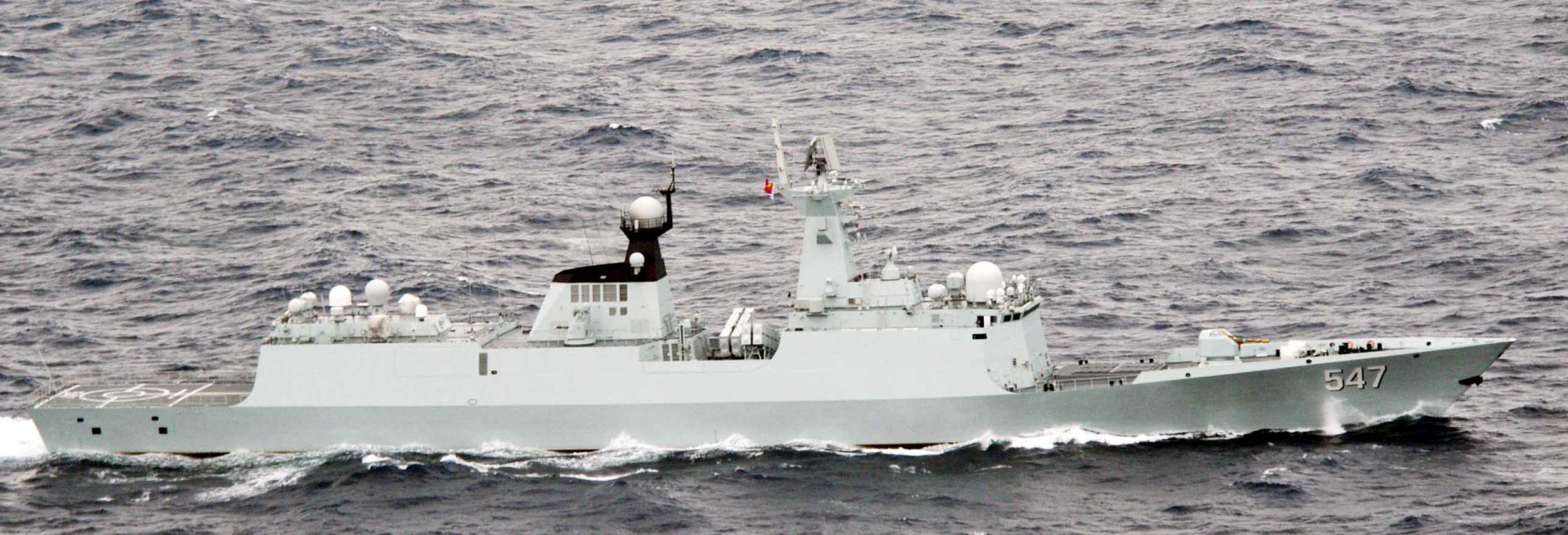
Linyi underway on 17 August 2015.

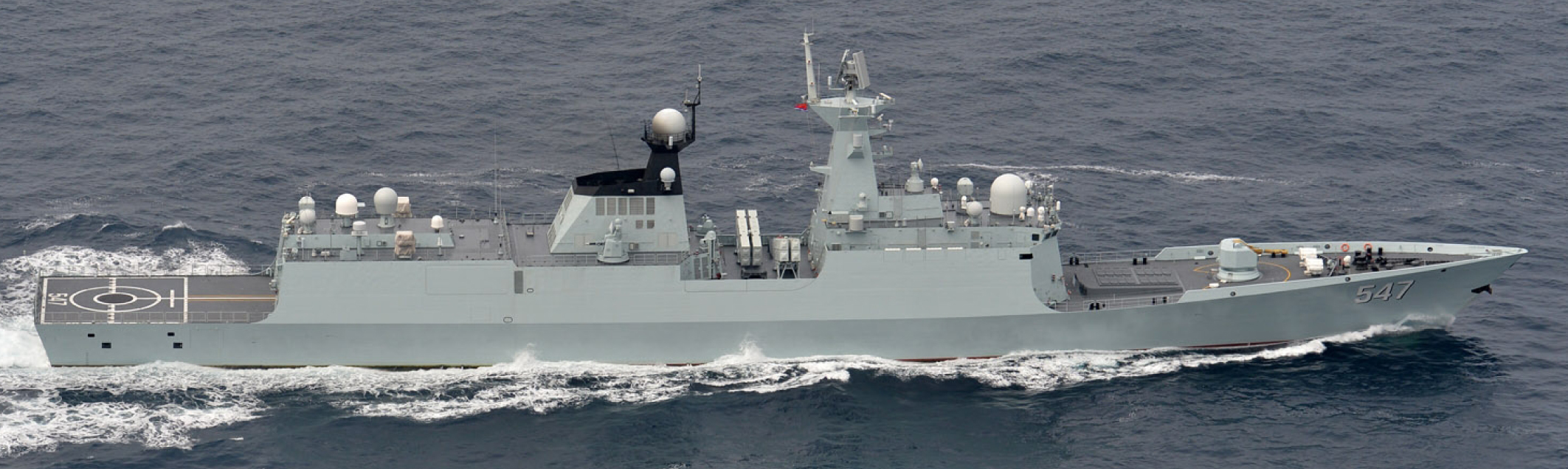
Linyi underway on 29 August 2015.

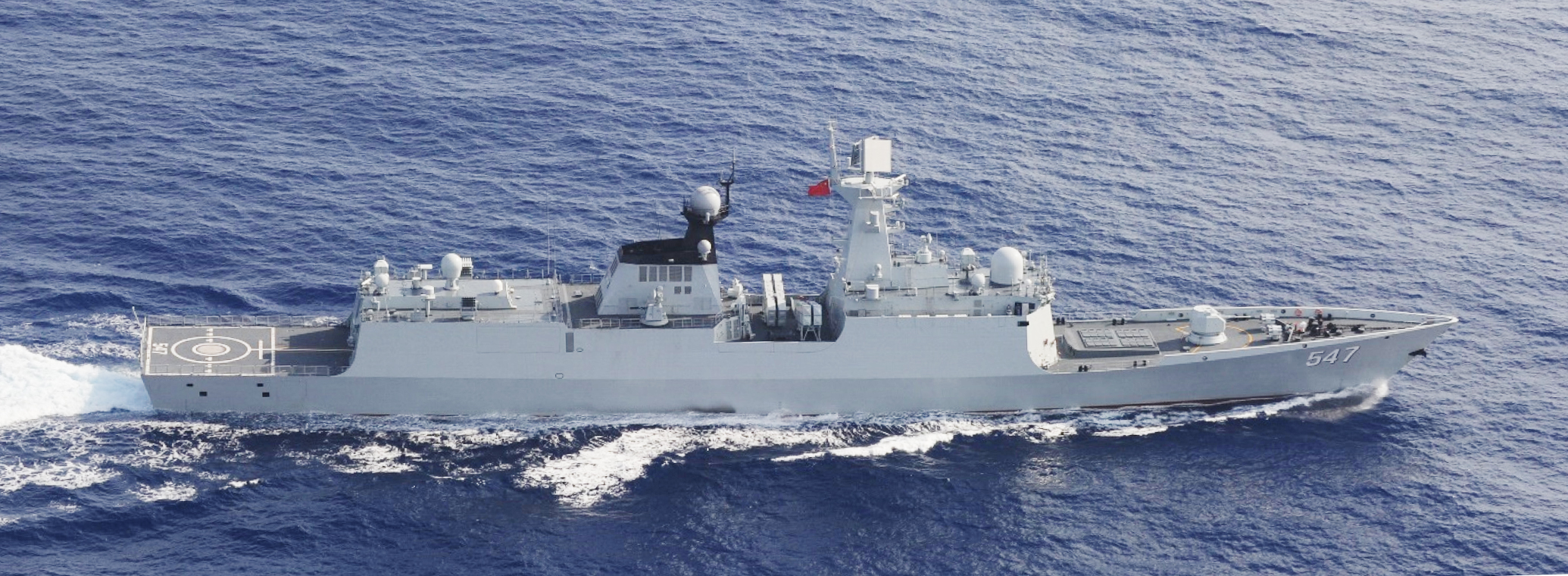
Linyi underway on 20 April 2018.

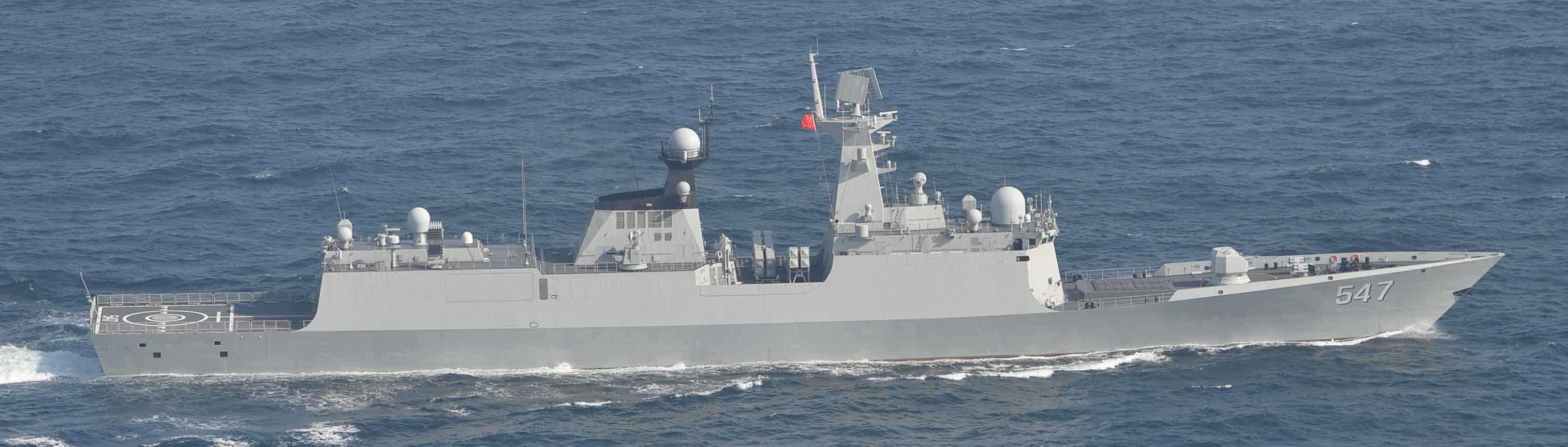
Linyi underway on 28 October 2019.

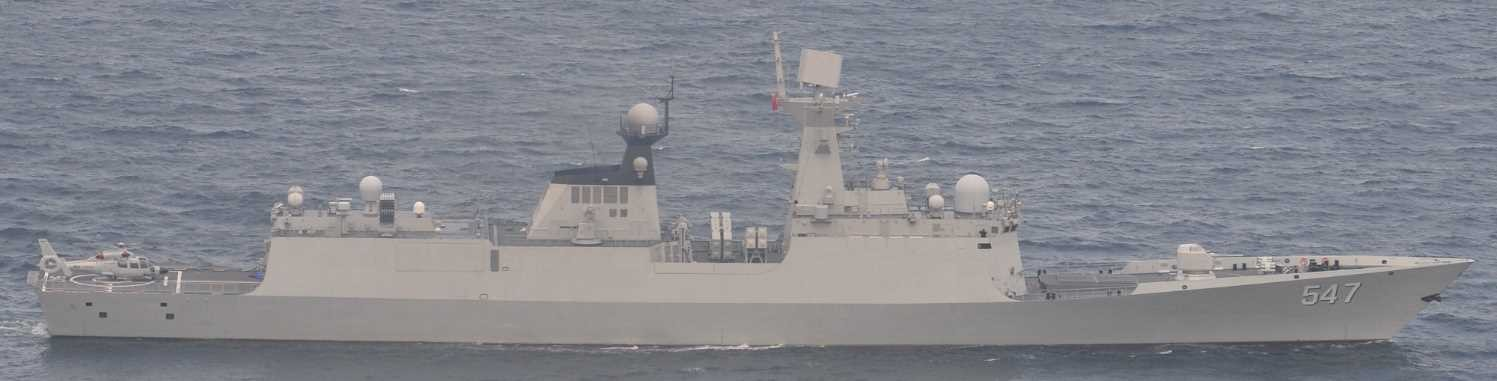
Linyi underway on 30 October 2019.
