= Chinese replenishment ship Qiandaohu =

Type 903 replenishment ship

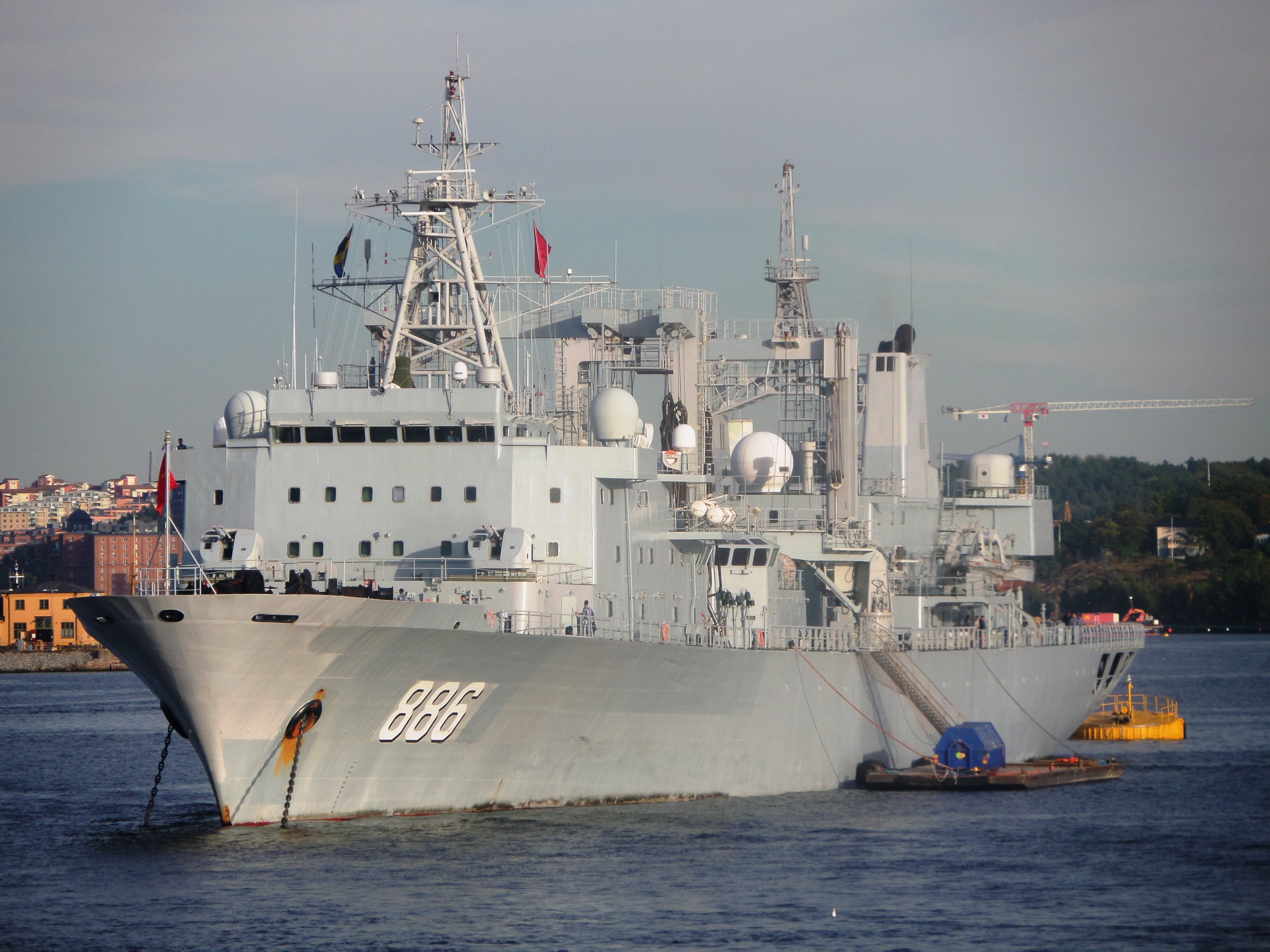
- Qiandaohu in Stockholm on 30 September 2015

History

China
- Name: Qiandaohu; (千岛湖)
- Namesake: Qiandao Lake
- Builder: Huangpu Shipyard, Guangzhou
- Launched: 21 July 2003
- Commissioned: 30 April 2004
- Identification: Pennant number: 886
- Status: Active

General characteristics
- Class & type: Type 903 replenishment ship
- Displacement: 20,500 tonnes
- Length: 178.5 m (586 ft)
- Beam: 24.8 m (81 ft)
- Draught: 8.7 m (29 ft)
- Propulsion: Two diesels; 24,000 hp (m) (11.9MW) sustained; 2 shafts
- Speed: 20 knots (37 km/h; 23 mph)
- Range: 10,000 nmi (19,000 km; 12,000 mi) at 14 knots (26 km/h; 16 mph)
- Capacity: 10,500 tons of fuel oil; 250 tons of fresh water; 680 tons of cargo and ammunition
- Complement: 130
- Armament: 4 x H/PJ76F twin 37 mm
- Aviation facilities: Hangar; Helipad

Qiandaohu (886) is the lead ship of the Type 903 replenishment ship of the People's Liberation Army Navy.

== Development and design ==
Type 903 integrated supply ship (NATO called Fuchi-class supply ship) is a new large-scale integrated supply ship of the Chinese People's Liberation Army Navy, designed by Zhang Wende. The later improved model is called 903A. The difference with 903 is that the displacement has increased from 20,530 tons to 23,000 tons.

All 9 ships have been built and are in service. The ship is a new generation of large-scale ocean-going integrated supply ship in China. Its supply equipment has been greatly improved compared to the earlier Type 905 integrated supply ship. It can be used for supply operations in horizontal, vertical, vertical, and sideways. It has two sides, three directions, and four stations. At the same time, the replenishment capability can complete fleet replenishment tasks in more complex situations. And the speed is higher than that of the Qinghaihu built with merchant ships as the standard, with a maximum speed of 20 knots, which can accompany fleet operations. The commissioning of this class of supply ship indicates that the People's Liberation Army Navy has a stable ocean-going combat capability, and this was proved in the subsequent Somalia escort missions. The 903 type integrated supply ship used some Russian equipment in the early stage, and later it was fully localized. This type of supply ship has undergone a comprehensive upgrade of electronic equipment, and has high formation communication capabilities, automatic statistics of materials, and the ability to report to formation command ships.

In the late 1990s, China's integrated supply ship Similan built for the Thai Navy's light aircraft carrier formation is generally considered to be an attempt by China to build a modern integrated supply ship. In the following years, China has learned experience and lessons. Improved on the basis of the Similan, and finally the Type 903 integrated supply ship was designed and finalized by the China State Shipbuilding Corporation.

== Construction and career ==
She was launched on 21 July 2003 at Huangpu Shipyard in Shanghai and commissioned on 30 April 2004 into the East Sea Fleet.

Qiandaohu participated in RIMPAC 2014.

On 3 April 2015, Jinan, Yiyang, and Qiandaohu formed the twentieth escort fleet of the People's Liberation Army Navy and set sail from a military port in Zhoushan City, Zhejiang Province, and went to the Gulf of Aden and Somali waters to take over The nineteenth batch of escort formations performed escort missions. In November 2015, the same ships made the first ever port call by PLAN ships to the Eastern Coast of the United States when they docked at Mayport Harbor, Florida for a goodwill visit.

== Gallery ==
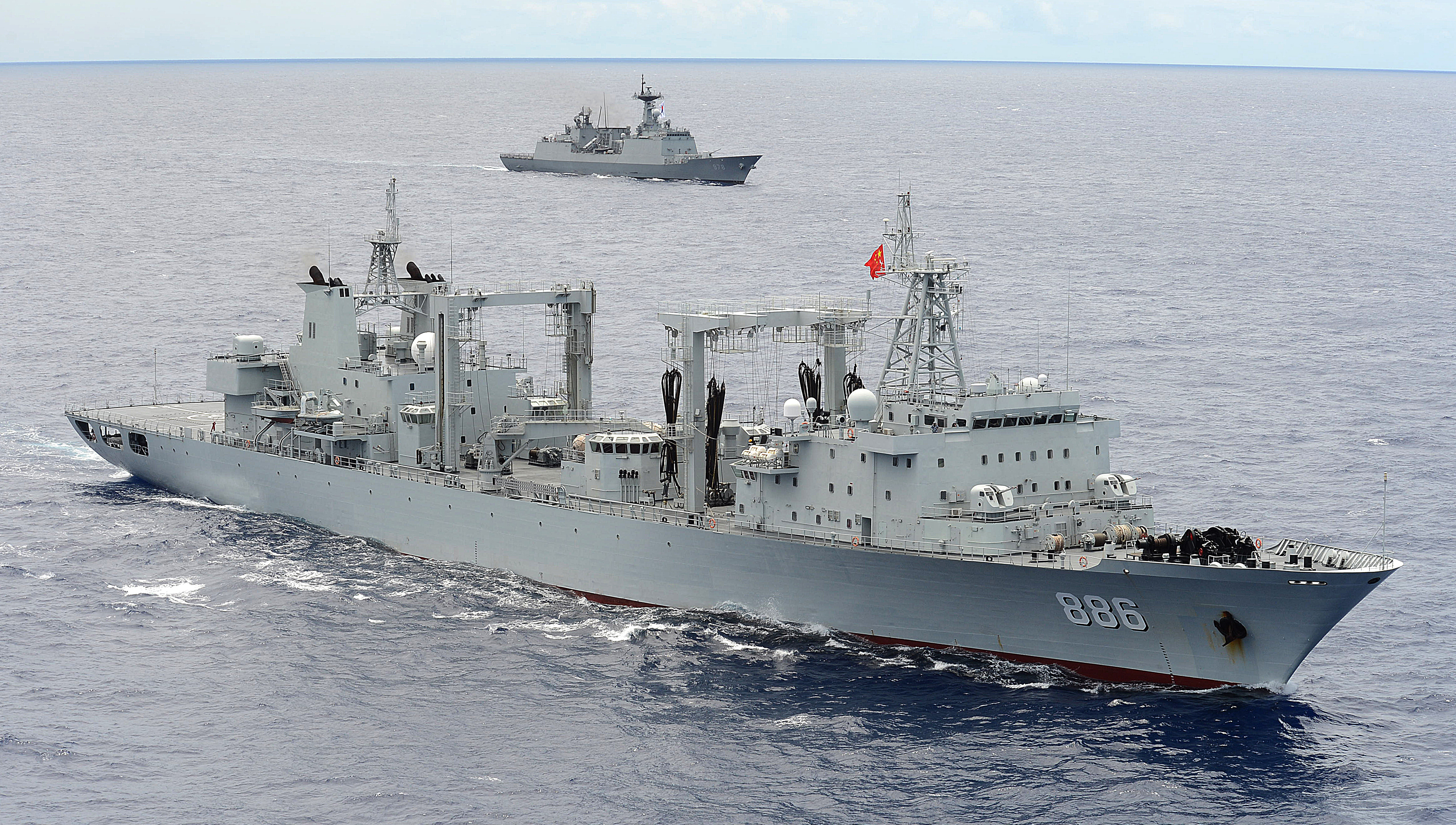
Qiandaohu and ROKS Wang Geon on 25 July 2014.

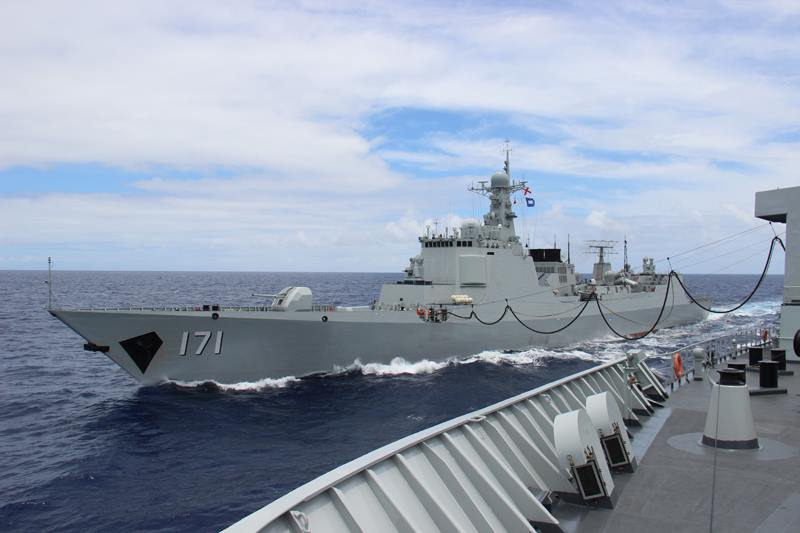
Qiandaohu and Haikou during RIMPAC on 12 July 2014.

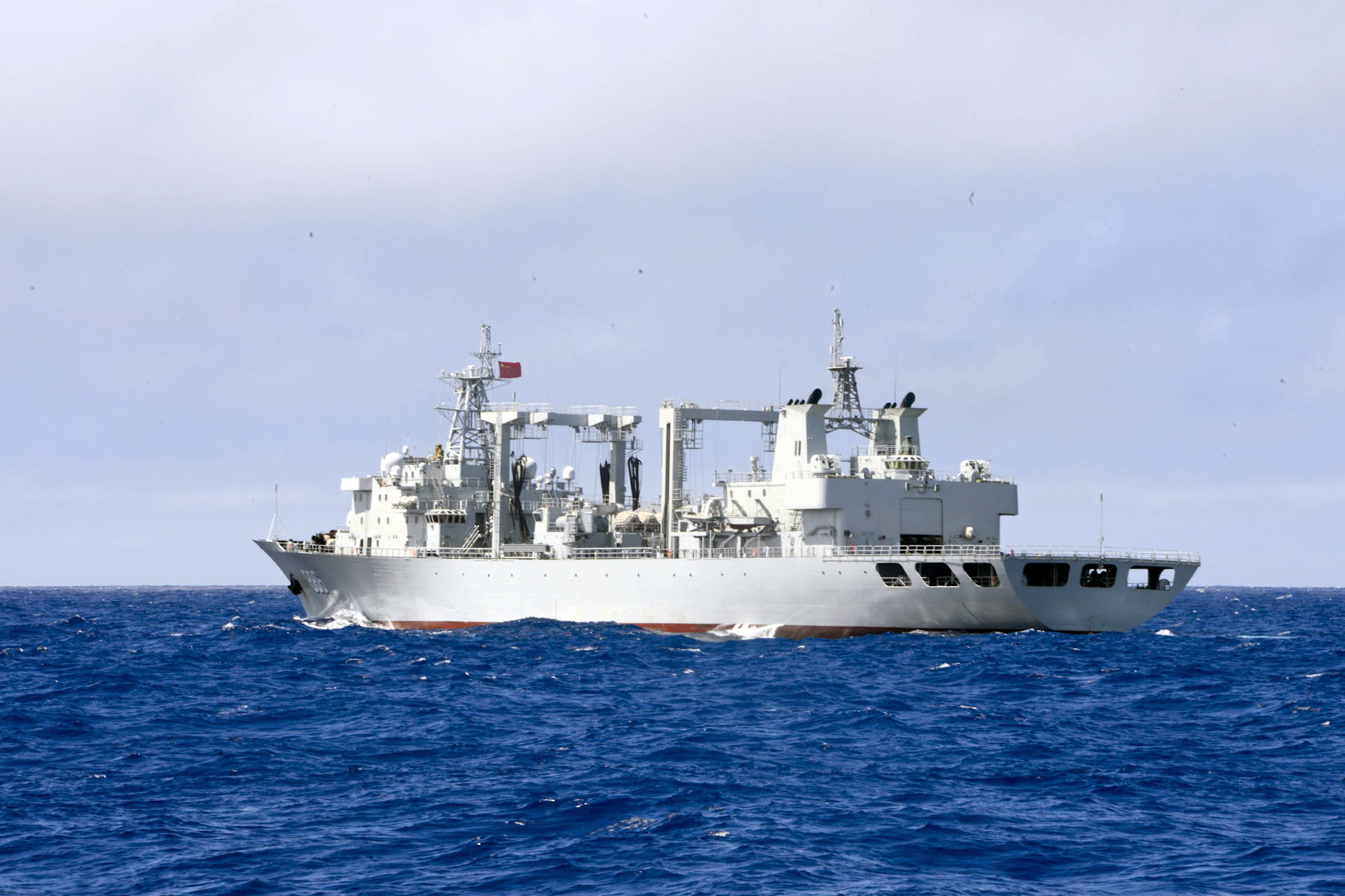
Qiandaohu during RIMPAC on 21 July 2014.

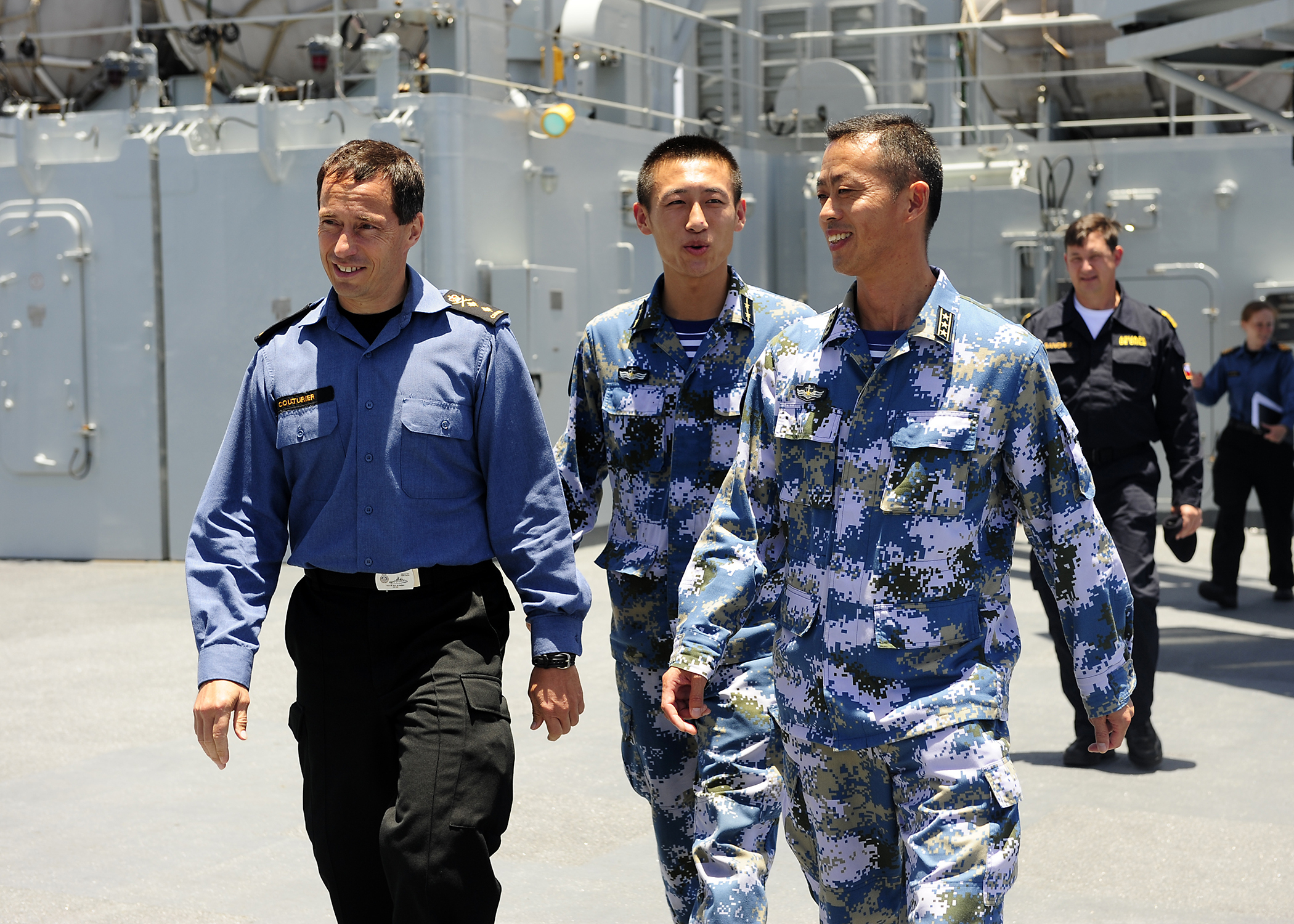
Qiandaohu during RIMPAC on 23 July 2014.

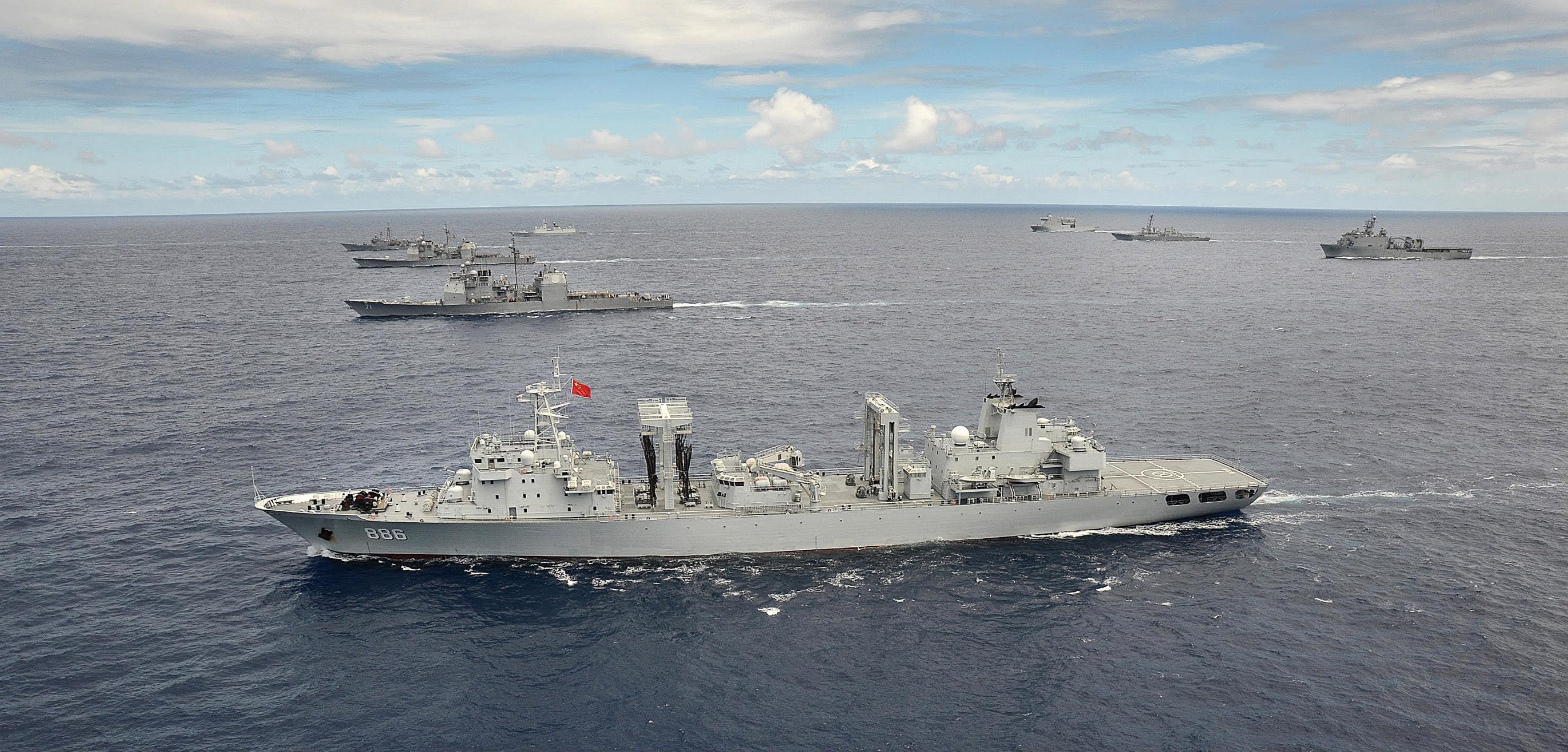
Qiandaohu during RIMPAC on 28 July 2014.

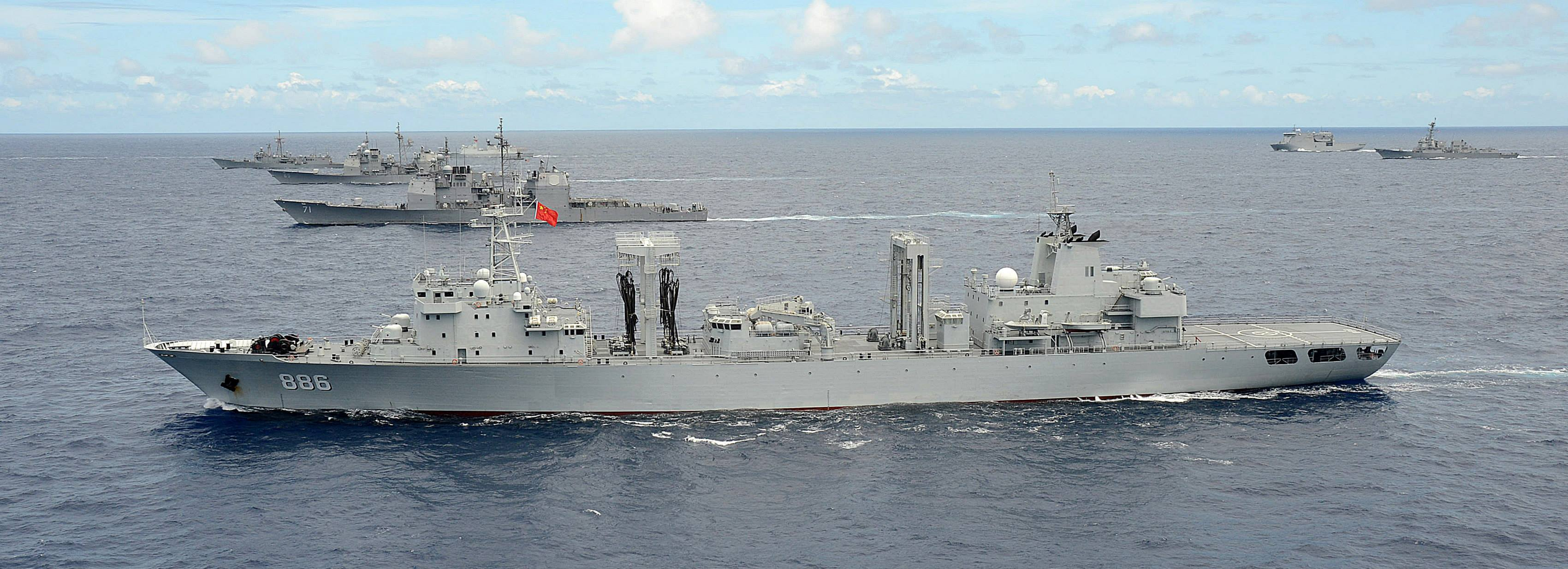
Qiandaohu during RIMPAC on 28 July 2014.

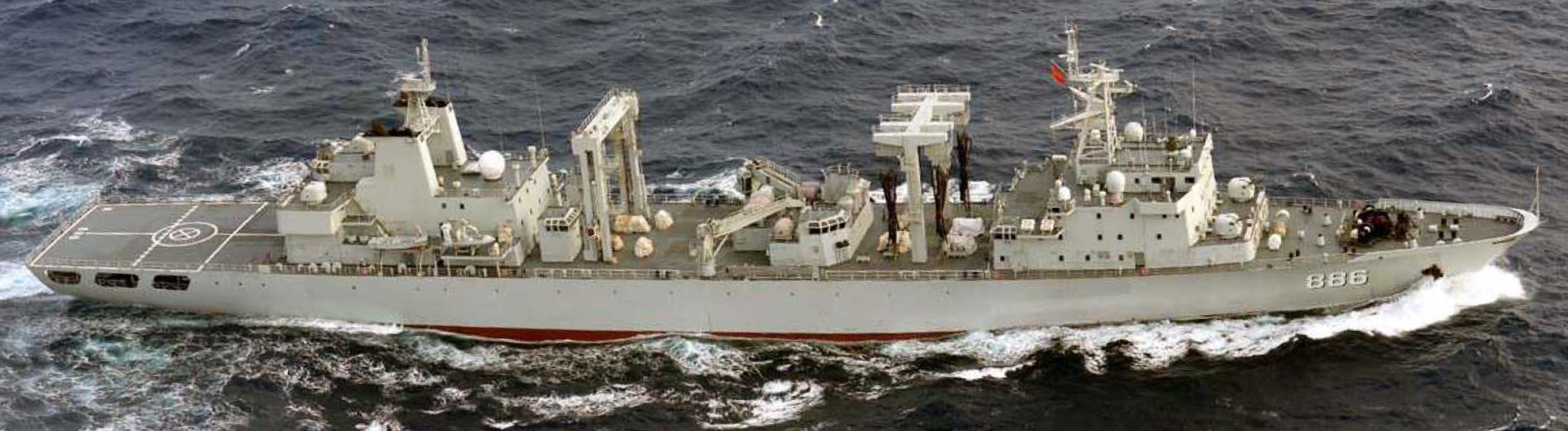
Qiandaohu on 12 December 2014.

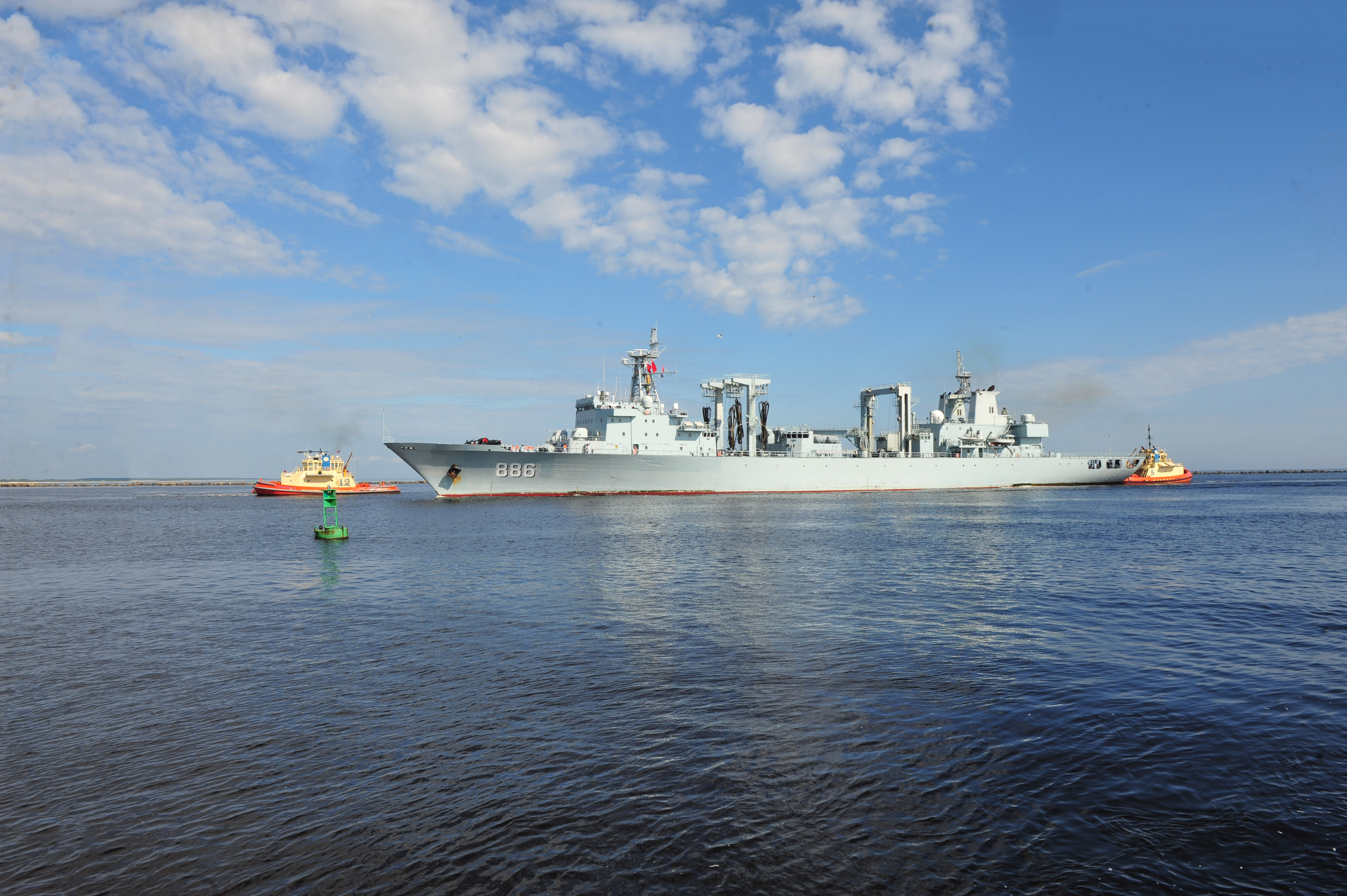
Qiandaohu in Mayport on 3 November 2015.

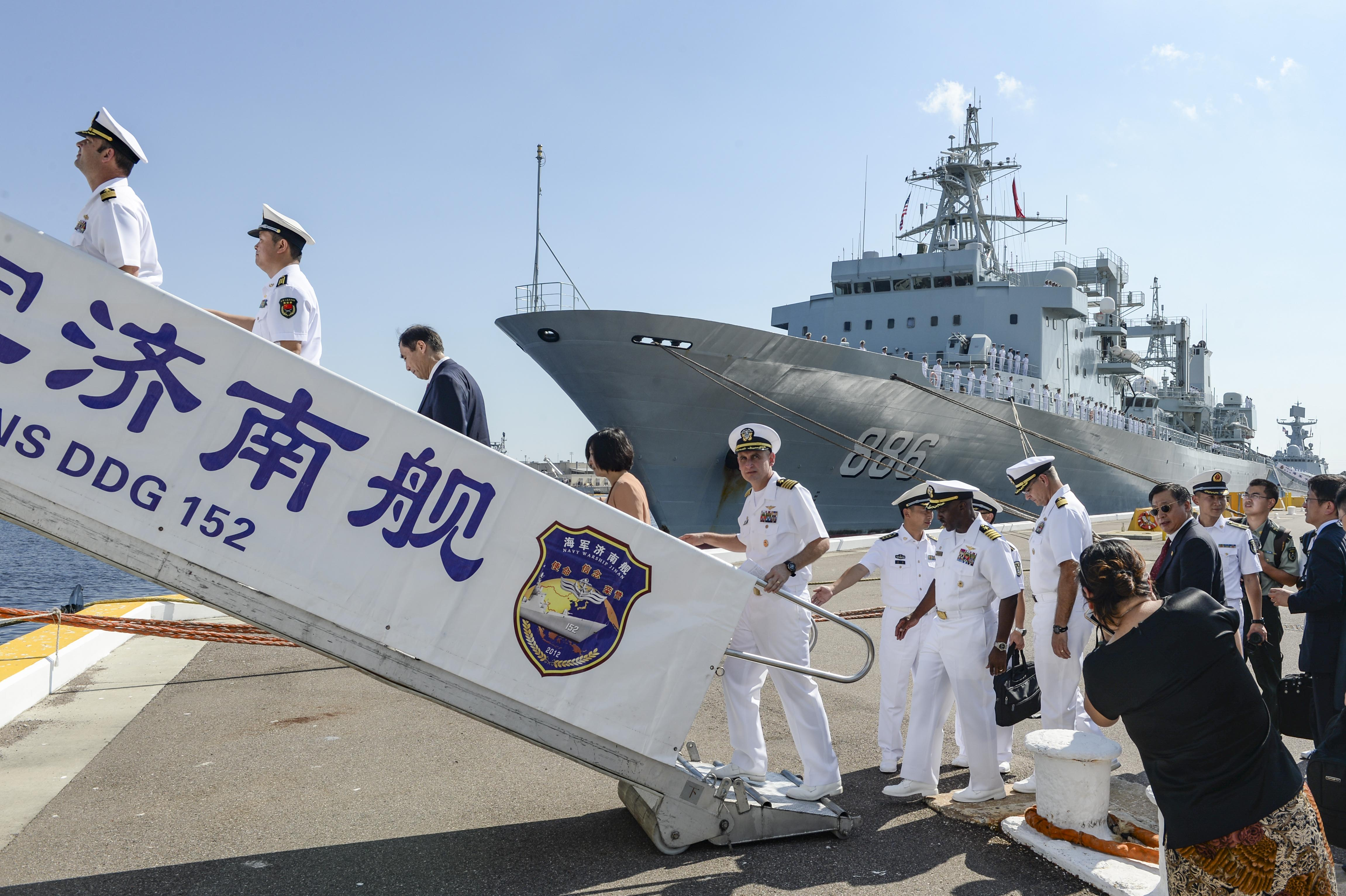
Qiandaohu in Mayport on 3 November 2015.

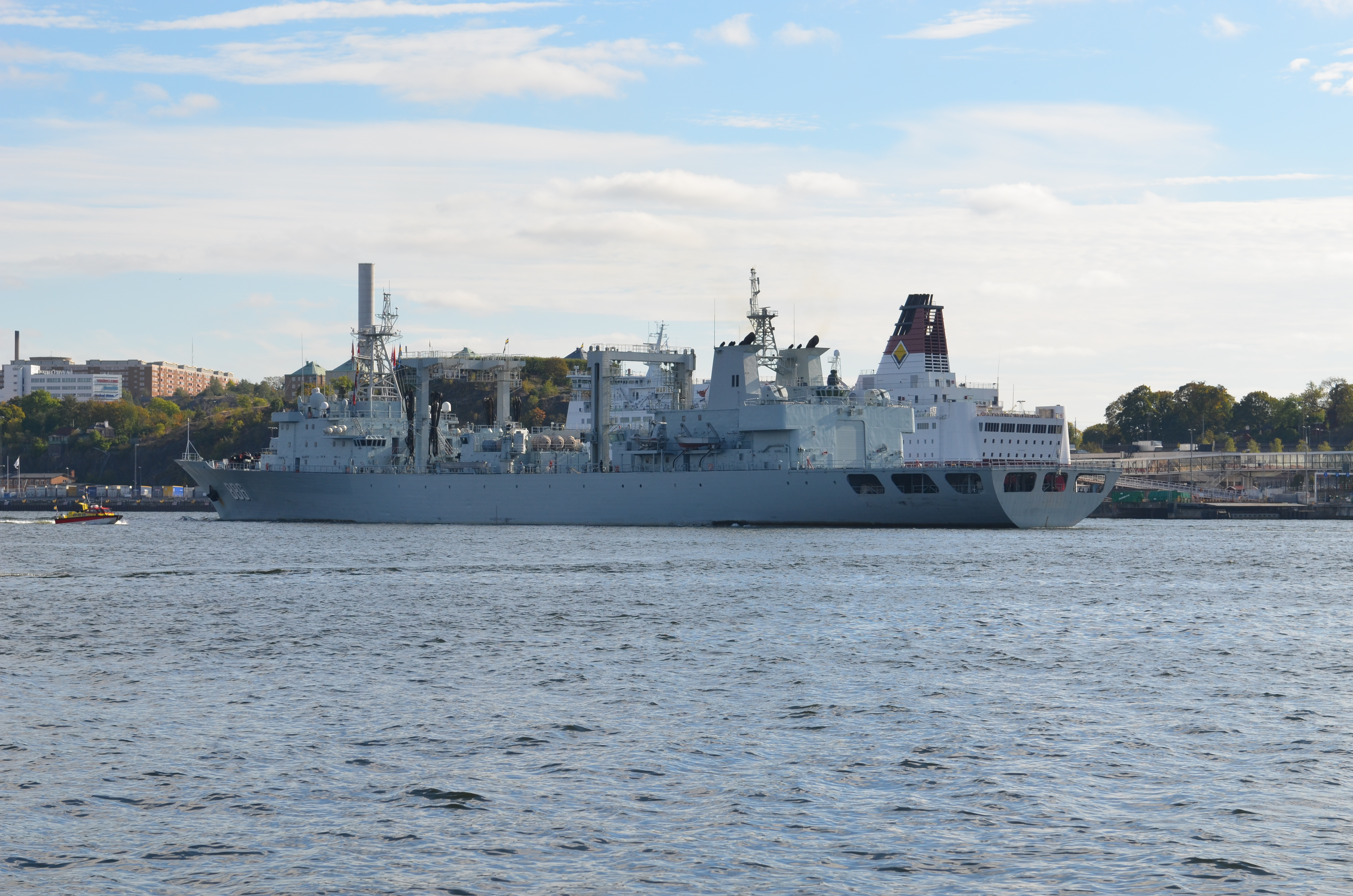
Qiandaohu in Stockholm on 30 September 2015.

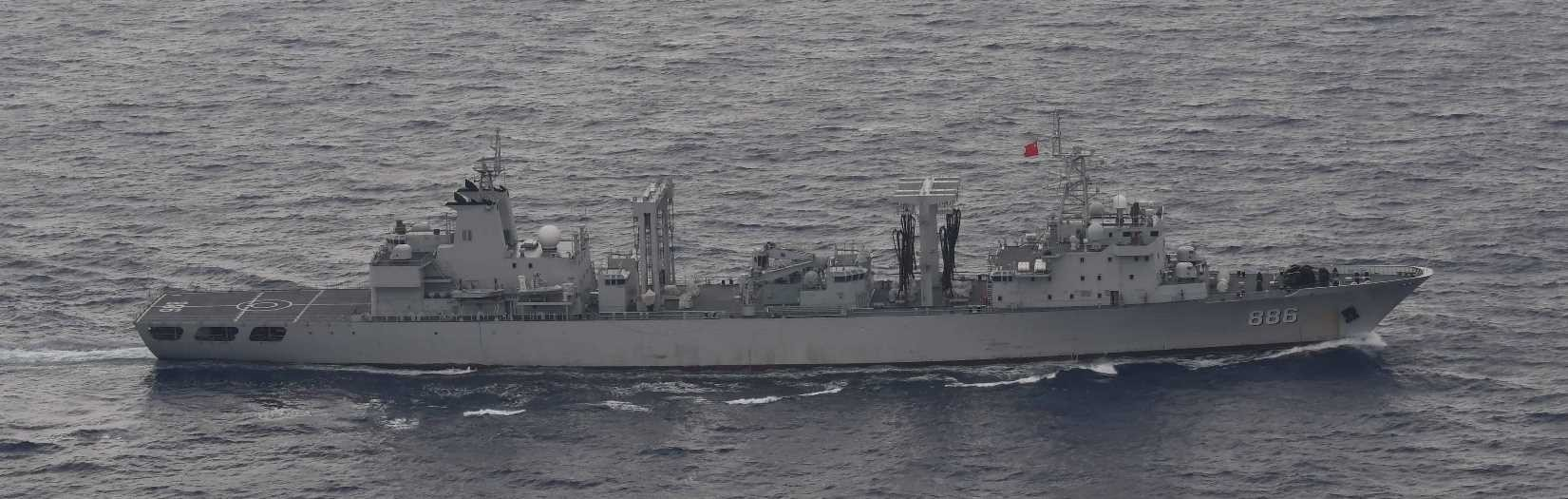
Qiandaohu on 29 May 2020.

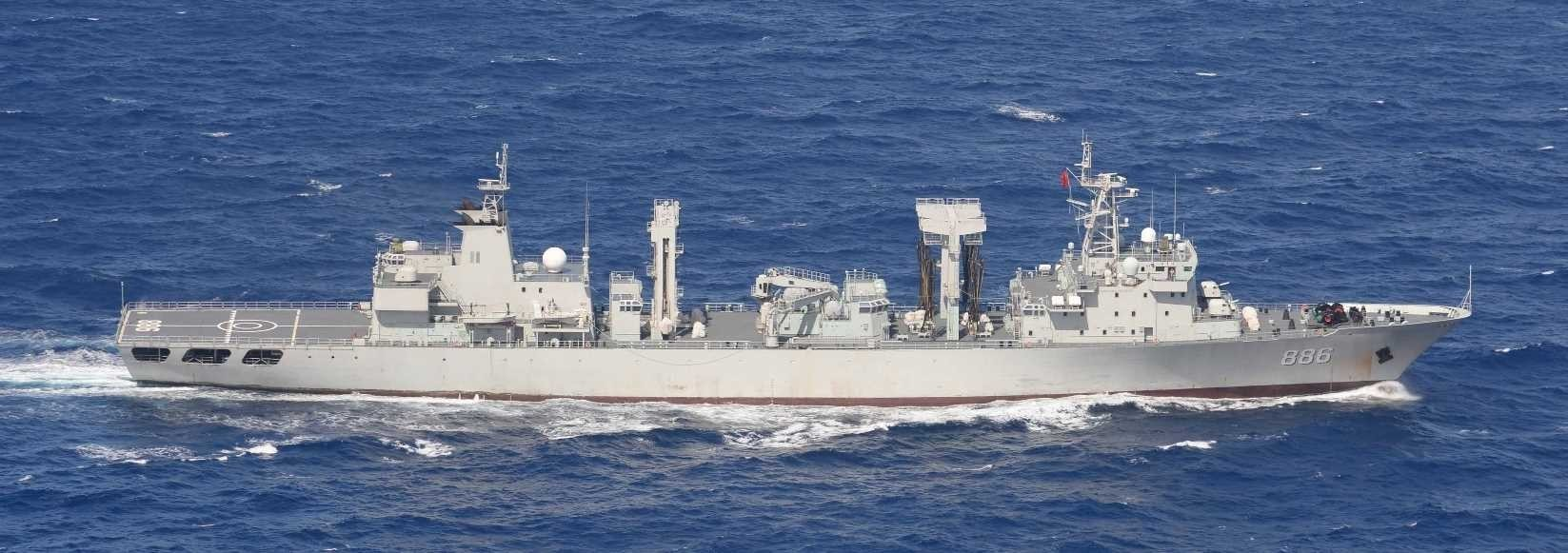
Qiandaohu on 22 June 2020.
