= Chinese destroyer Jinan (152) =

Type 025C destroyer of the PLA Navy

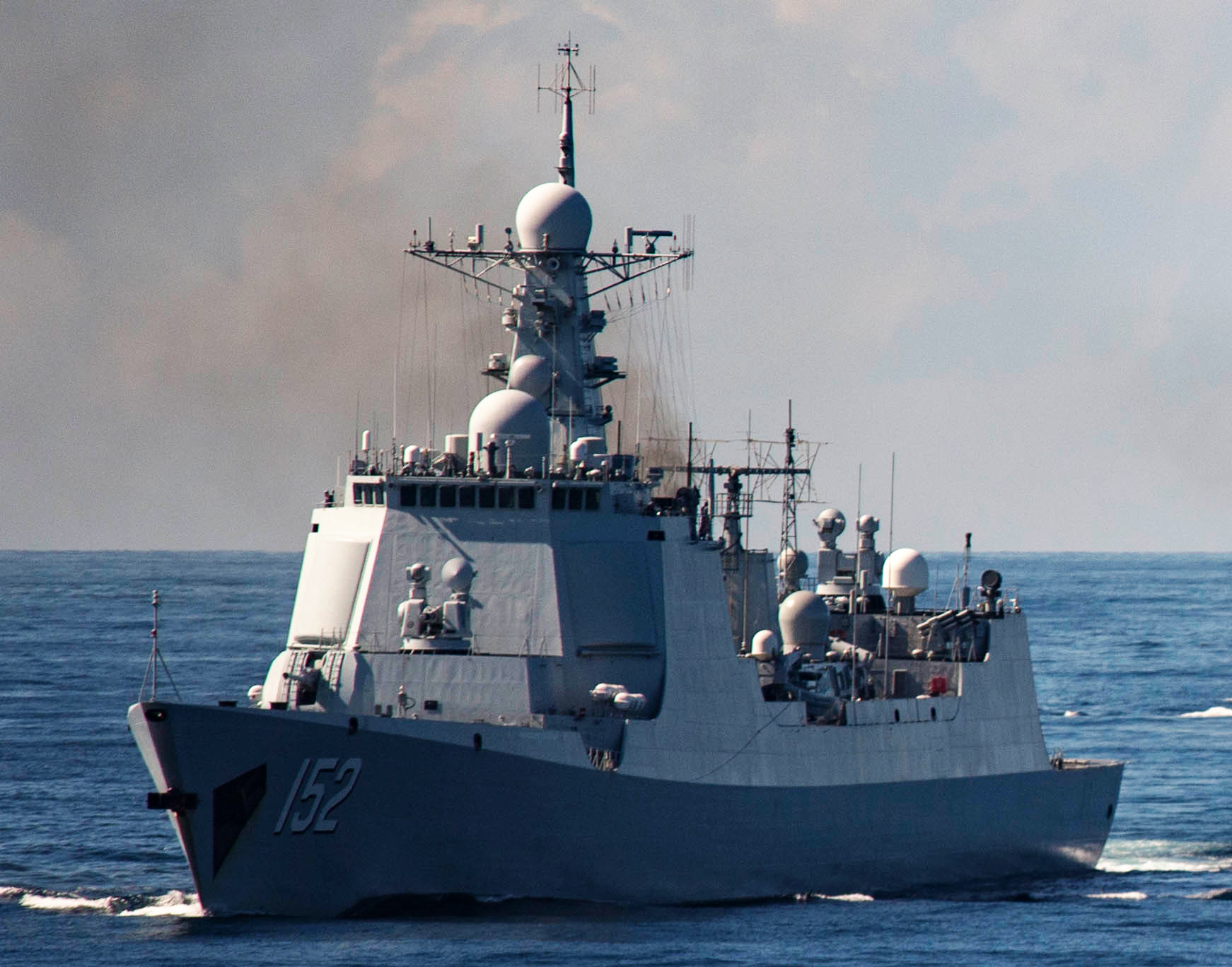
- Jinan underway on 7 November 2015

History

China
- Name: Jinan
- Namesake: Jinan; (济南)
- Builder: Jiangnan Shipyard, Shanghai
- Laid down: December 2011
- Launched: January 2012
- Commissioned: 22 December 2014
- Home port: Zhoushan
- Identification: Pennant number: 152
- Motto: "使命、信念、荣誉"; "Mission, Beliefs and Honor"
- Status: Active

General characteristics
- Class & type: Type 052C destroyer
- Displacement: 7,000 tons
- Length: 155 m (508 ft 6 in)
- Beam: 17 m (55 ft 9 in)
- Draught: 6 m (19 ft 8 in)
- Propulsion: Combined diesel or gas; 2 x DA80 gas turbines (35.7 MW each); 2 x MTU 20V 956TB92 diesels (6 MW each)
- Speed: 29 knots (54 km/h; 33 mph)
- Range: 4,500 nautical miles (8,300 km; 5,200 mi) at 15 knots
- Complement: 280
- Sensors & processing systems: Type 346 radar (air search, fire control); Type 517 radar (air search); Type 364 radar (air and surface search); Type 344 radar (main gun fire control); Type 347G(2) radar (Type 730 fire control); Type 366 radar (YJ-62 fire control); Bow mounted sonar
- Electronic warfare & decoys: NRJ-6A
- Armament: 48 HHQ-9 surface-to-air missiles; 8 YJ-62 anti-ship cruise missiles; 1 × 100 mm PJ-87 gun; 2 × 30mm Type 730 close-in weapons systems; 6 x torpedo tubes; 4 x multiple rocket launchers (possibly multirole)
- Aircraft carried: 1 helicopter: Kamov Ka-28 or Harbin Z-9
- Aviation facilities: Hangar and helipad

Jinan (152) is a Type 052C destroyer of the People's Liberation Army Navy (PLAN). She was commissioned in 22 December 2014. She is a member of the East Sea Fleet. The ship motto is "使命, 信念, 荣誉" which roughly translates to "Mission, Beliefs and Honor".

== Development and design ==
The Type 052C appears to share the same basic hull design as the Type 052B destroyer, which in turn is based on the Type 051B destroyer. Stealth features are incorporated. They uses predominantly Chinese systems derived from earlier foreign technology; the preceding Type 052 and Type 052B destroyers used a mixture of Russian and Chinese systems.

The Type 052C propulsion is in the combined diesel or gas (CODOG) arrangement, with two Ukrainian DA80 gas turbines and two MTU 20V 956TB92 diesel engines. The DA80s had blade problems and may have contributed to the last two Type 052Cs sitting pierside at the shipyard for two years without being accepted by the PLAN.

A Kamov Ka-28 or Harbin Z-9 helicopter may operate from the rear hangar and flight deck. The Ka-28 is equipped with a search radar and dipping sonar and can also employ sonobuoys, torpedoes, depth charges, or mines. The Z-9 is a variant of the Airbus Helicopters AS365 Dauphin. The naval variant of the Z-9, the Z-9C, is equipped with the KLC-1 search radar, dipping sonar, and is typically armed with a single, lightweight torpedo. Either helicopter significantly improves the anti-submarine capabilities of the Type 052C.

The main gun is a 100 mm (4 in) PJ-87. The gun suffered from jamming and may have influenced the decision to adopt a different weapon for the Type 052D destroyer. The weapon has a rate of fire of 25 rounds per minute. Close-in defence is provided by two seven-barrel 30 mm (1.2 in) Type 730 CIWS, one mounted forward of the bridge and one atop the hangar. Each gun has a maximum rate of fire of 4200 rounds per minute.

== Construction and career ==
Jinan was launched in January 2012 at the Jiangnan Shipyard in Shanghai. The ship was commissioned on 22 December 2014.

On 3 April 2015, Jinan, Yiyang, and Qiandaohu formed the twentieth escort fleet of the People's Liberation Army Navy and set sail from a military port in Zhoushan City, Zhejiang Province, and went to the Gulf of Aden and Somali waters to take over The nineteenth batch of escort formations performed escort missions. In November 2015, the same ships made the first ever port call by PLAN ships to the Eastern Coast of the United States when they docked at Mayport Harbor, Florida for a goodwill visit.

== Gallery ==
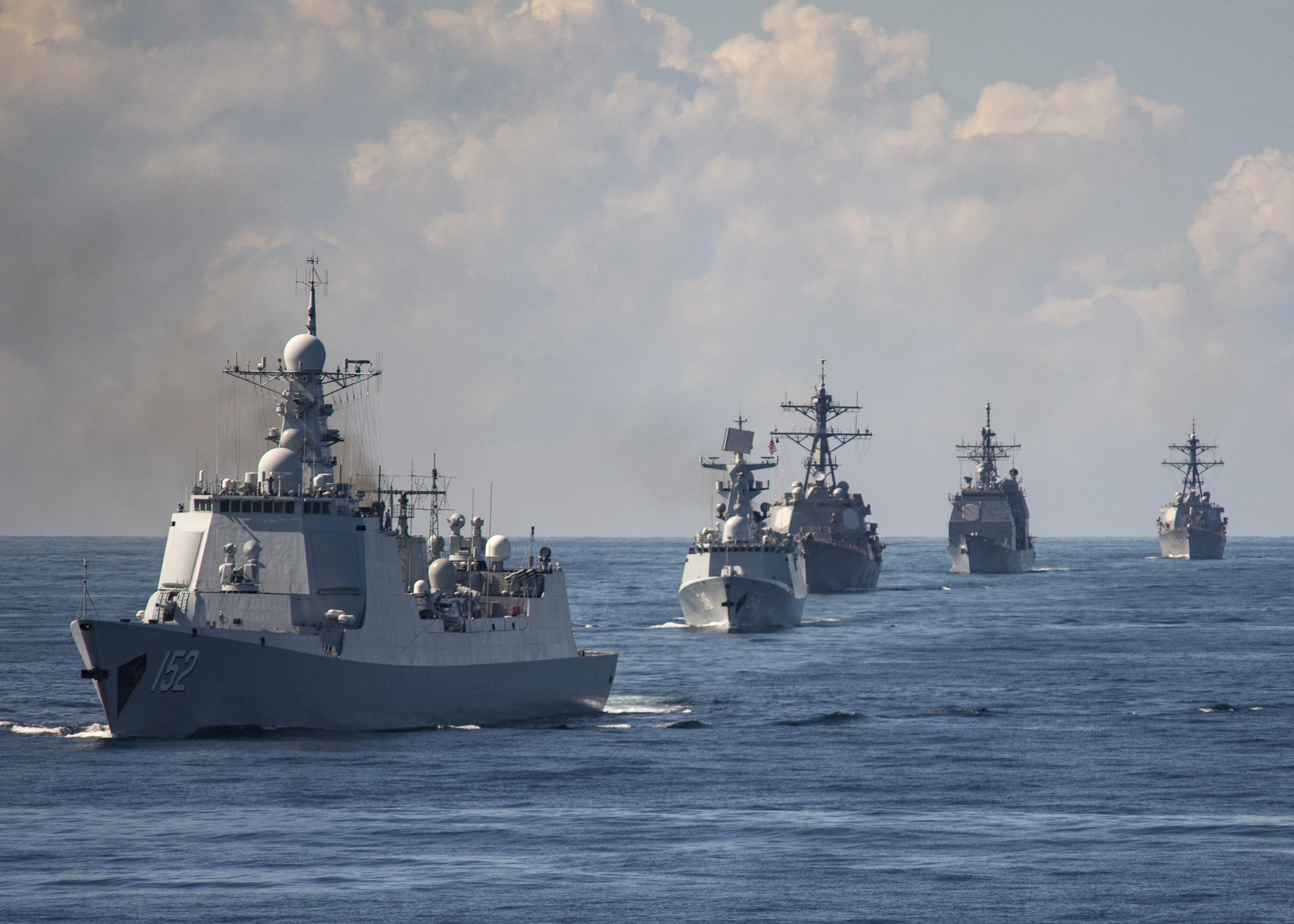
Jinan with U.S. Navy ships in the Atlantic on 3 April 2015.

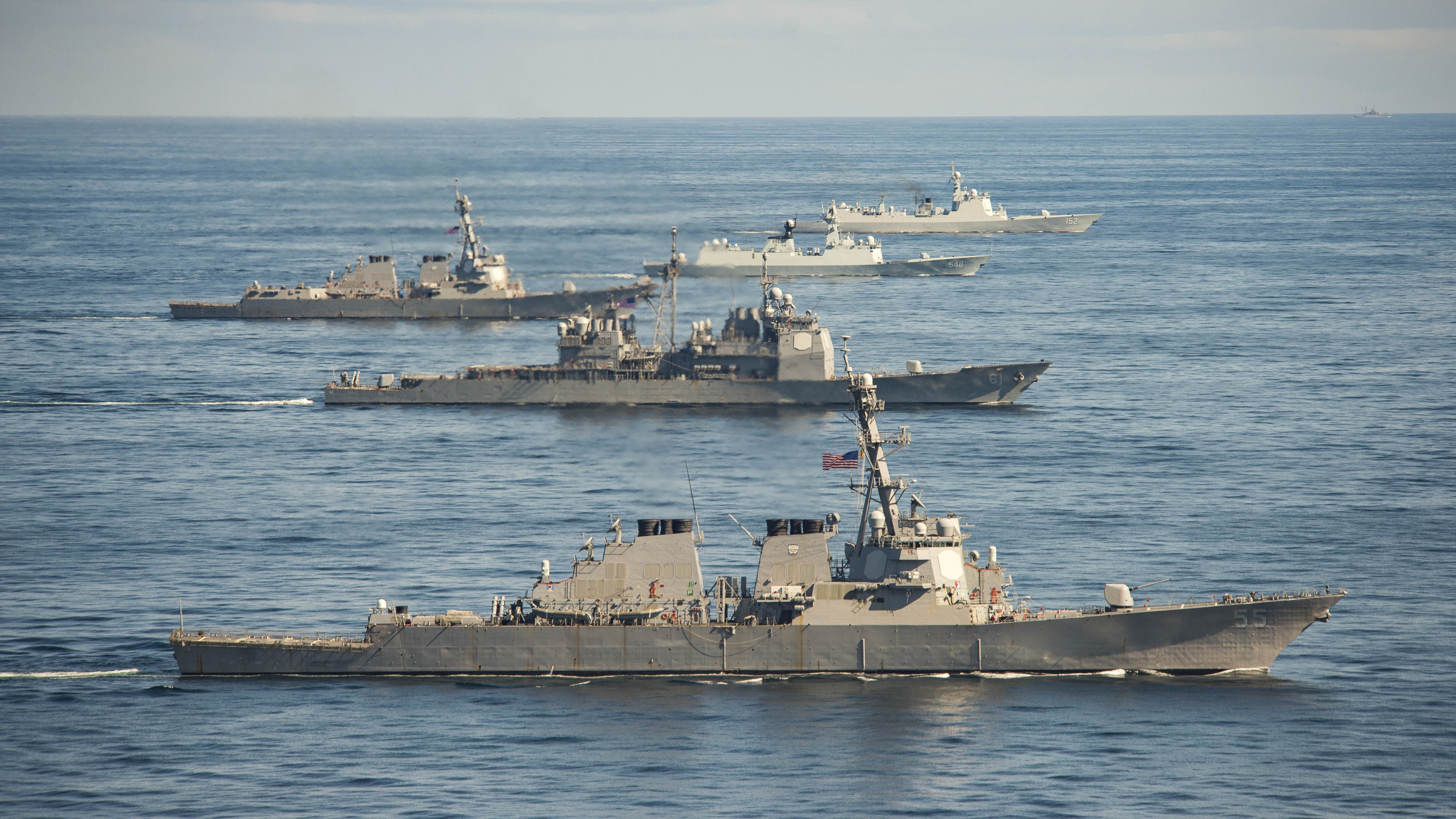
Jinan with U.S. Navy ships in the Atlantic on 3 April 2015.

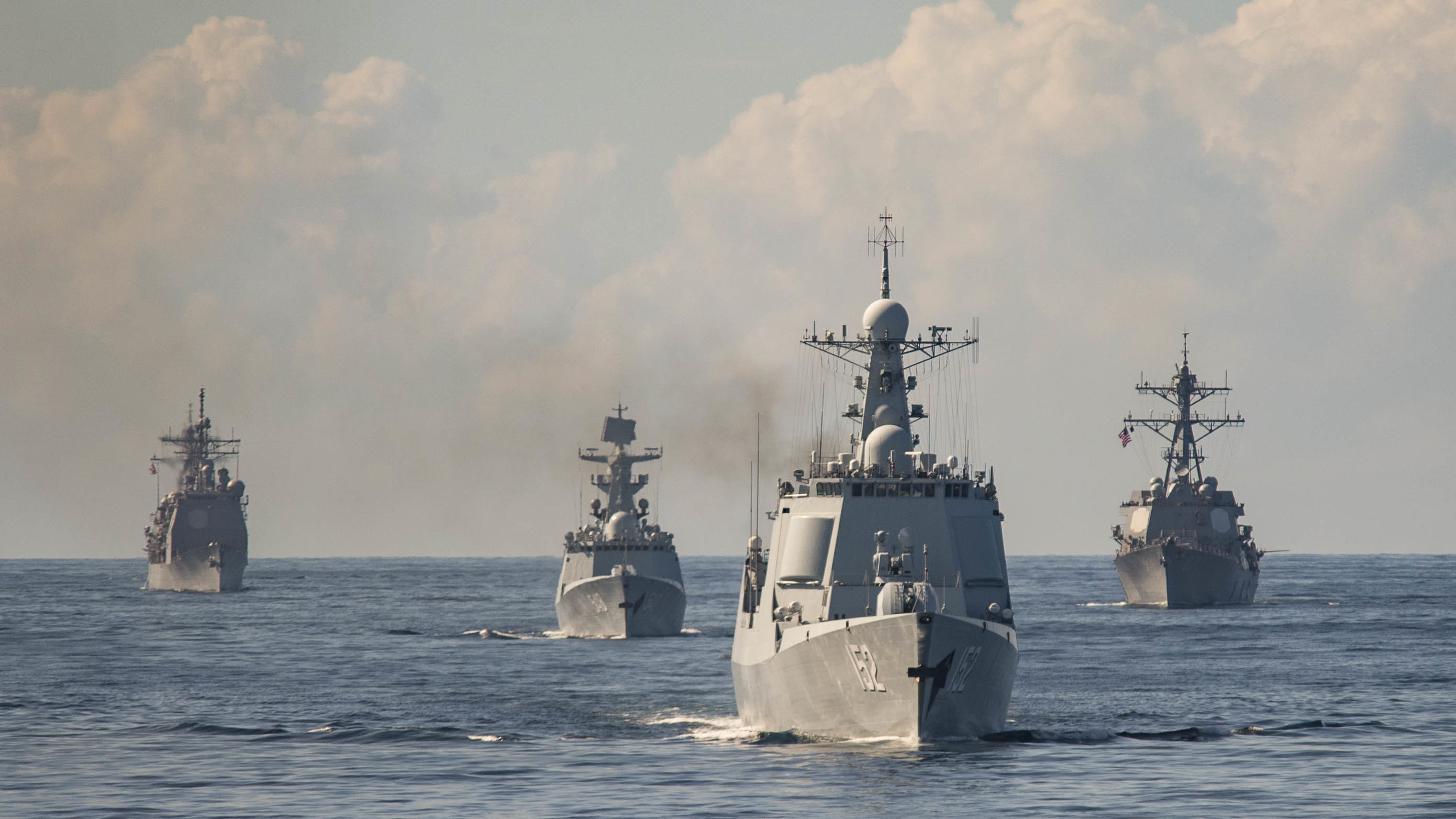
Jinan with U.S. Navy ships in the Atlantic on 3 April 2015.

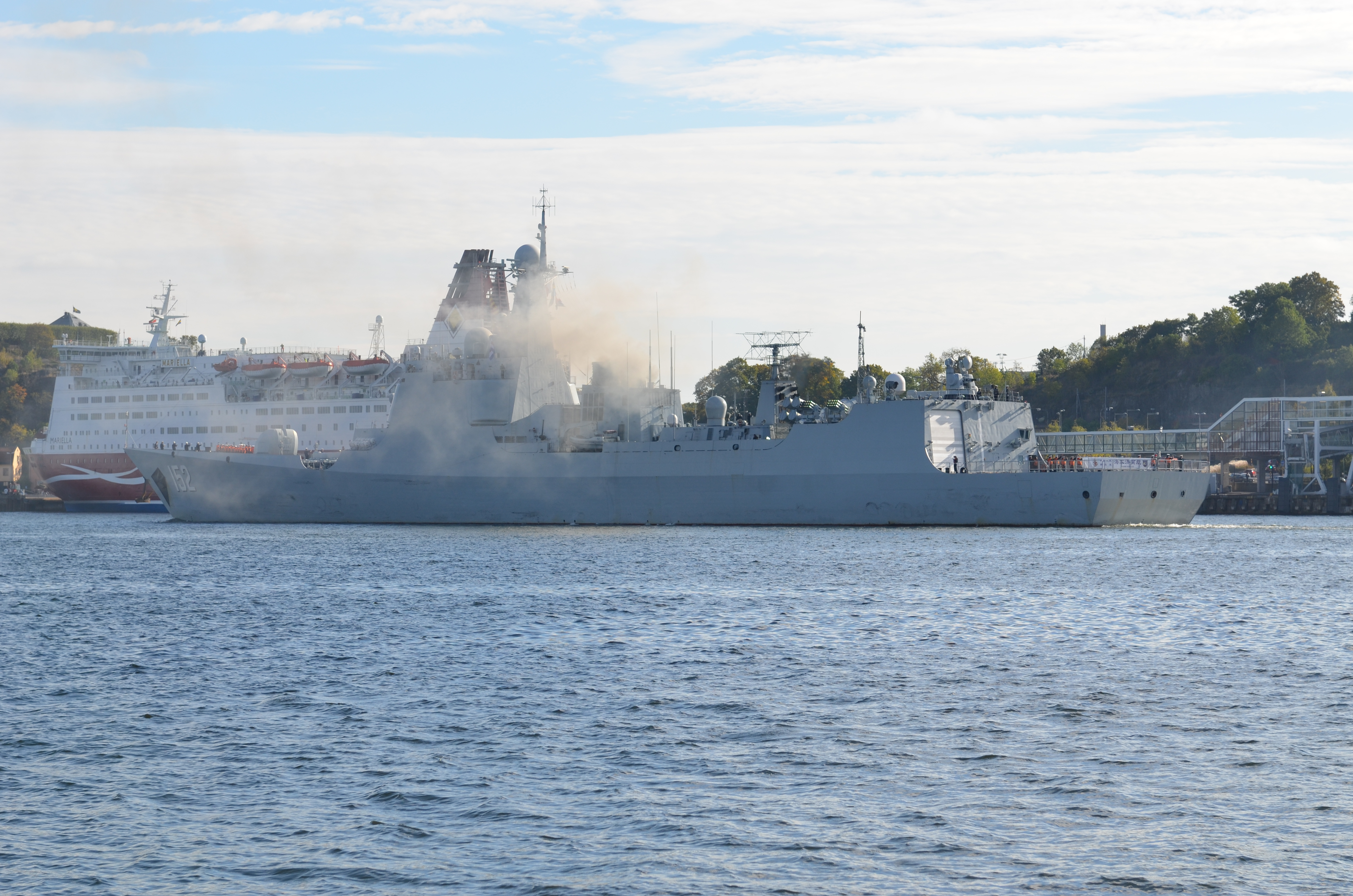
Jinan moored in Stockholm on 4 October 2015.

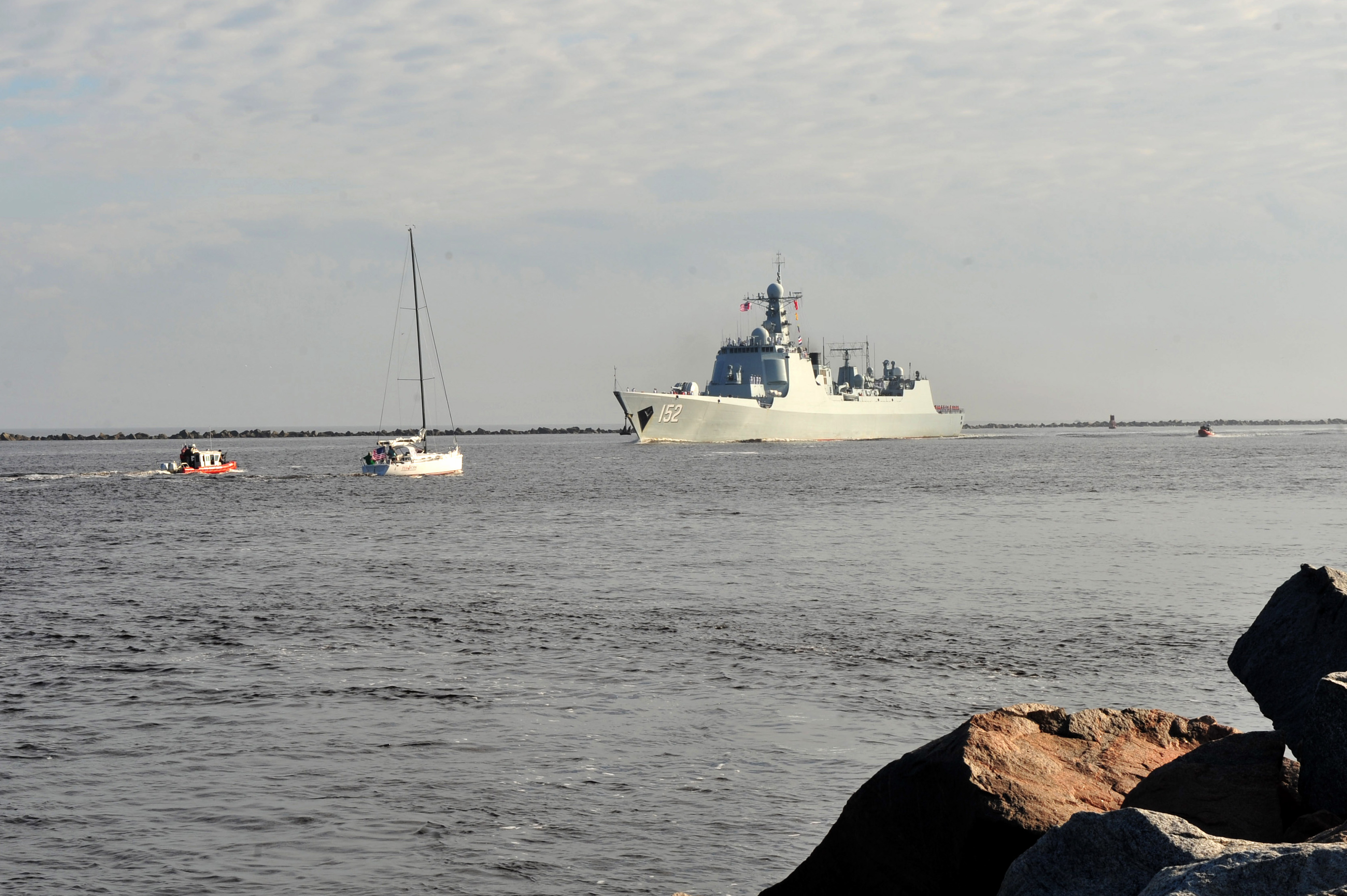
Jinan off at Mayport, Florida on 3 November 2015.

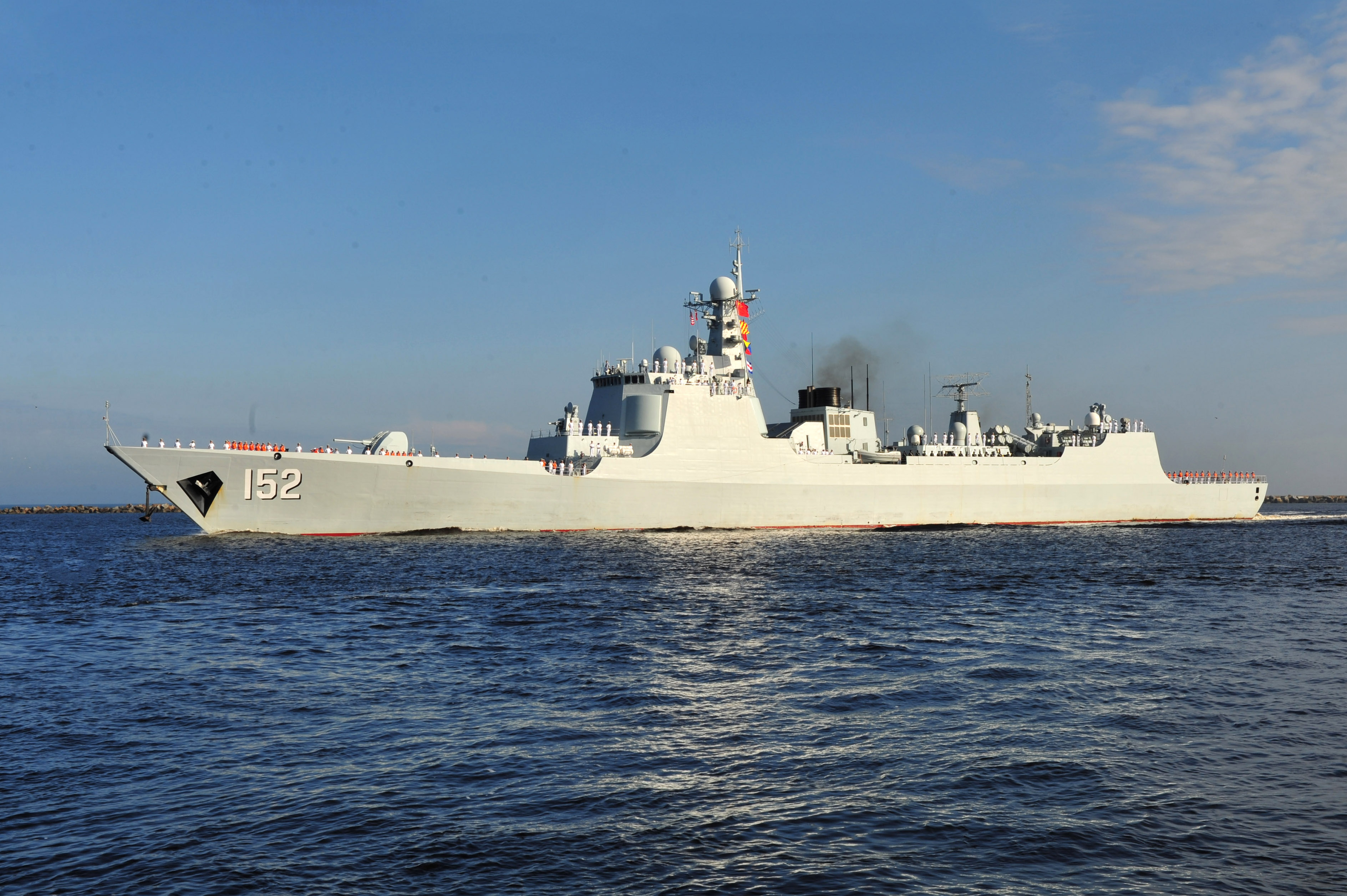
Jinan off at Mayport, Florida on 3 November 2015.

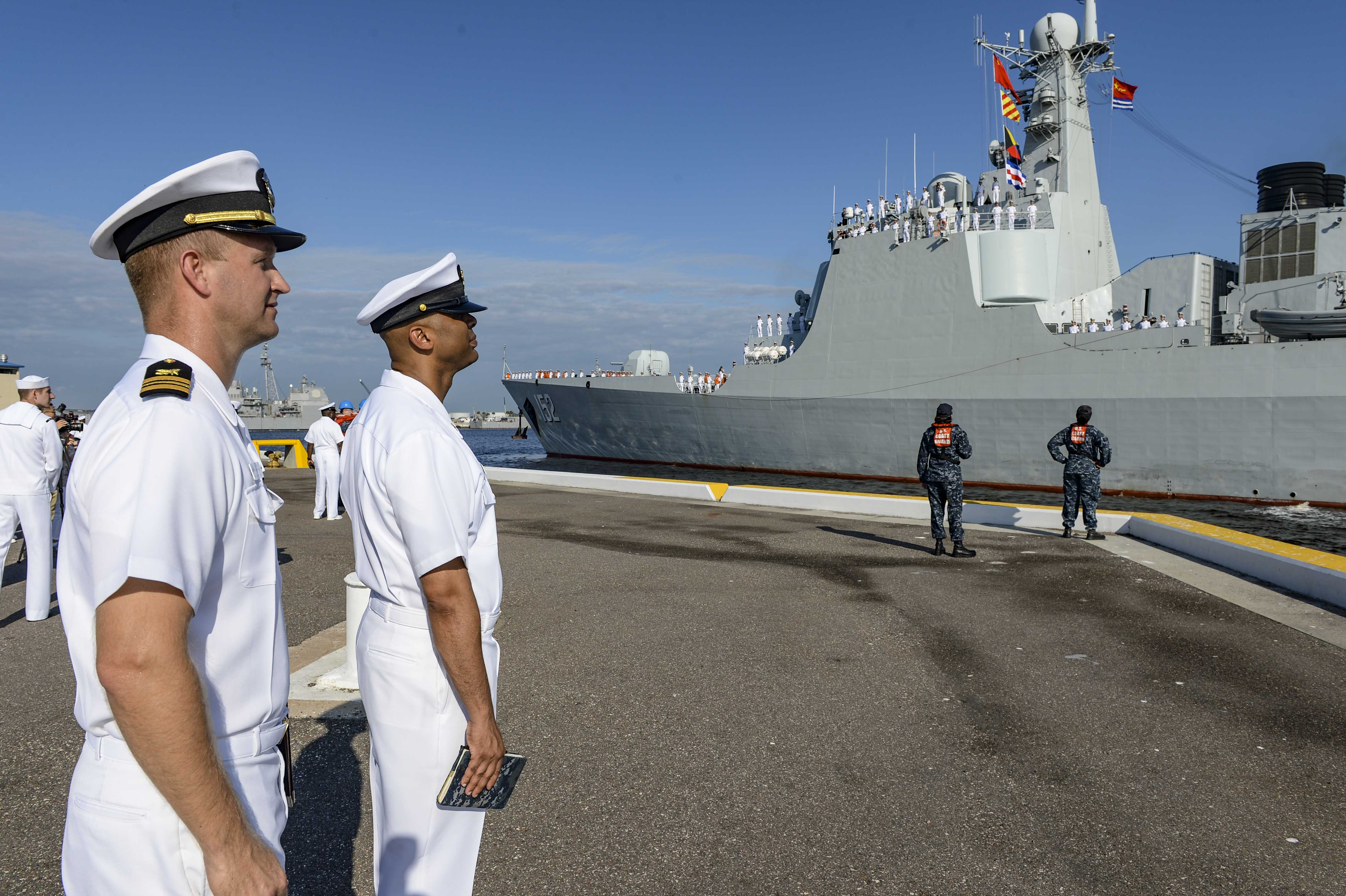
Jinan moored at Mayport, Florida on 3 November 2015.

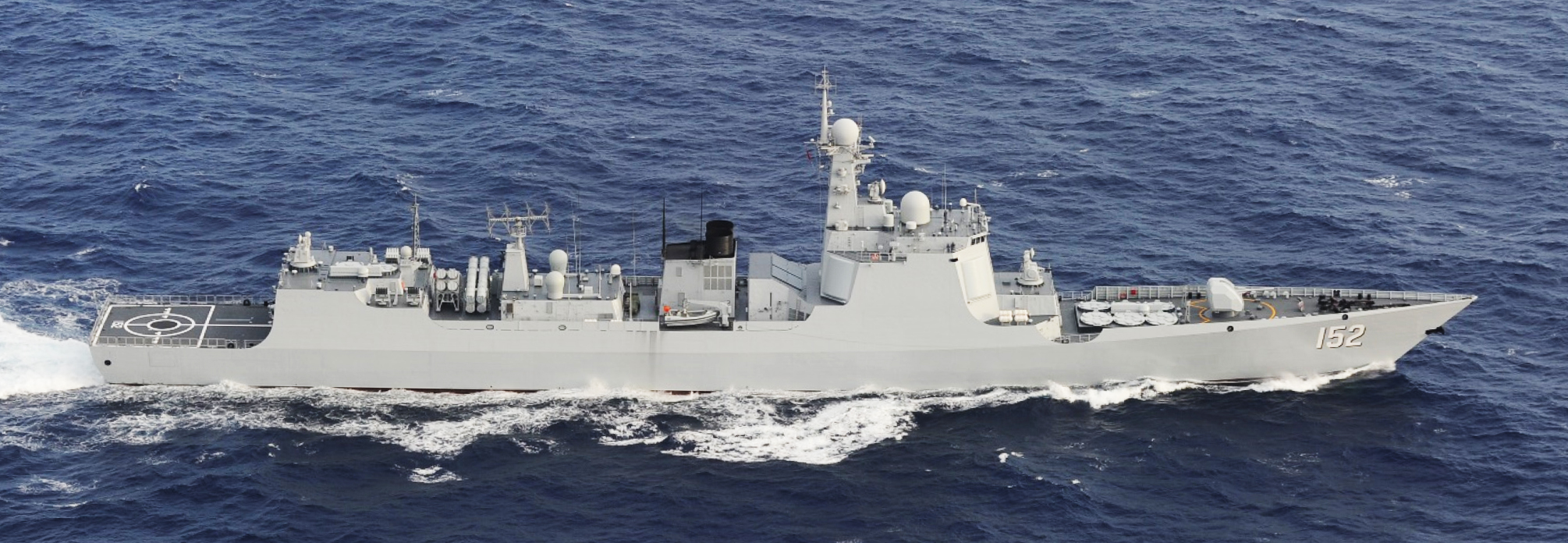
Jinan underway 20 April 2018.

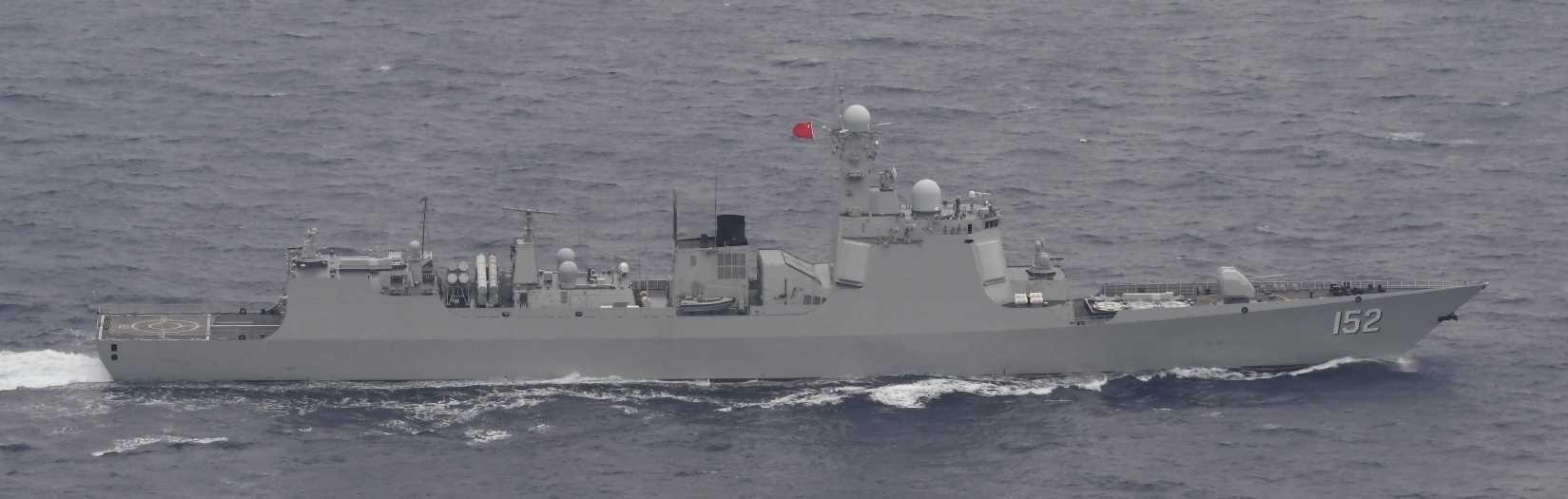
Jinan underway 29 May 2020.

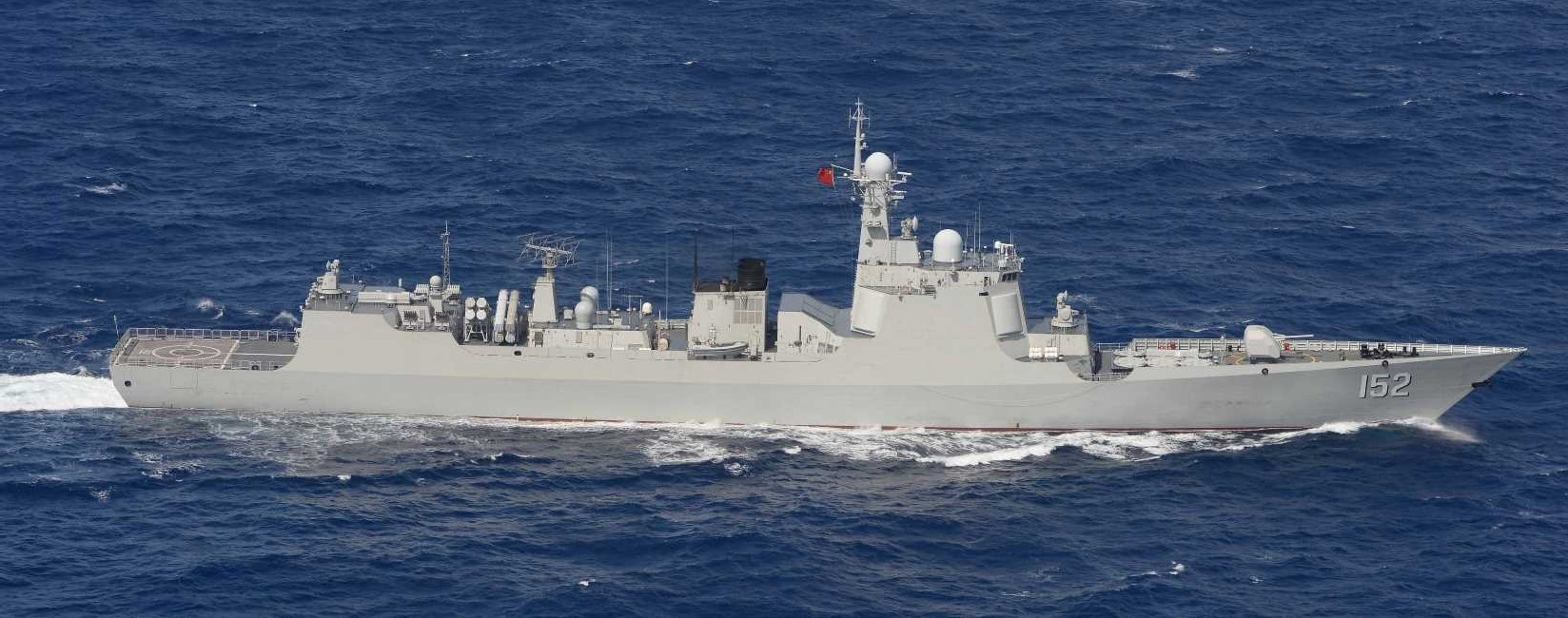
Jinan underway 22 June 2020.
