= List of Mikoyan-Gurevich MiG-21 operators =

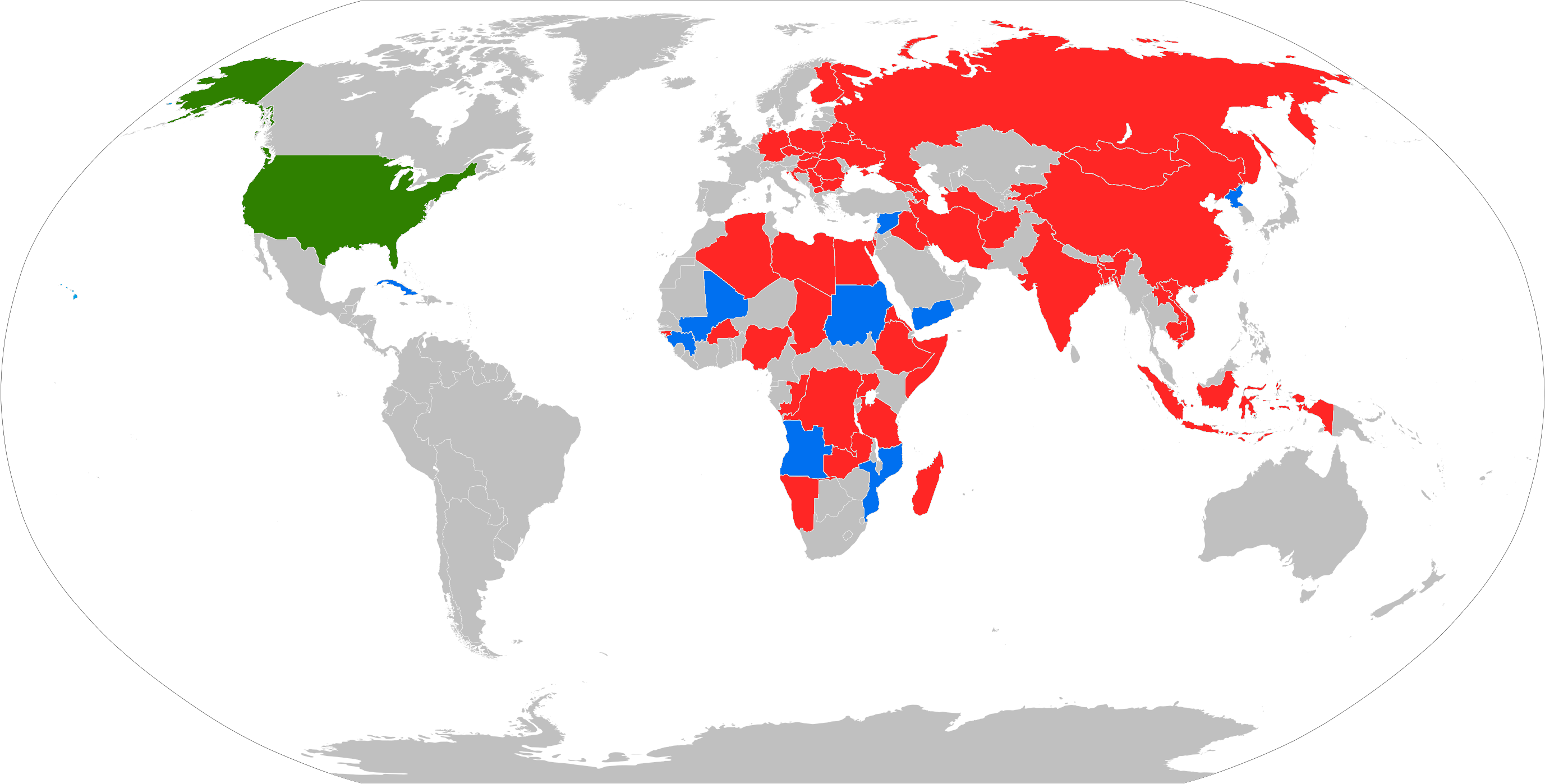
MiG-21 operators Current Former Captured

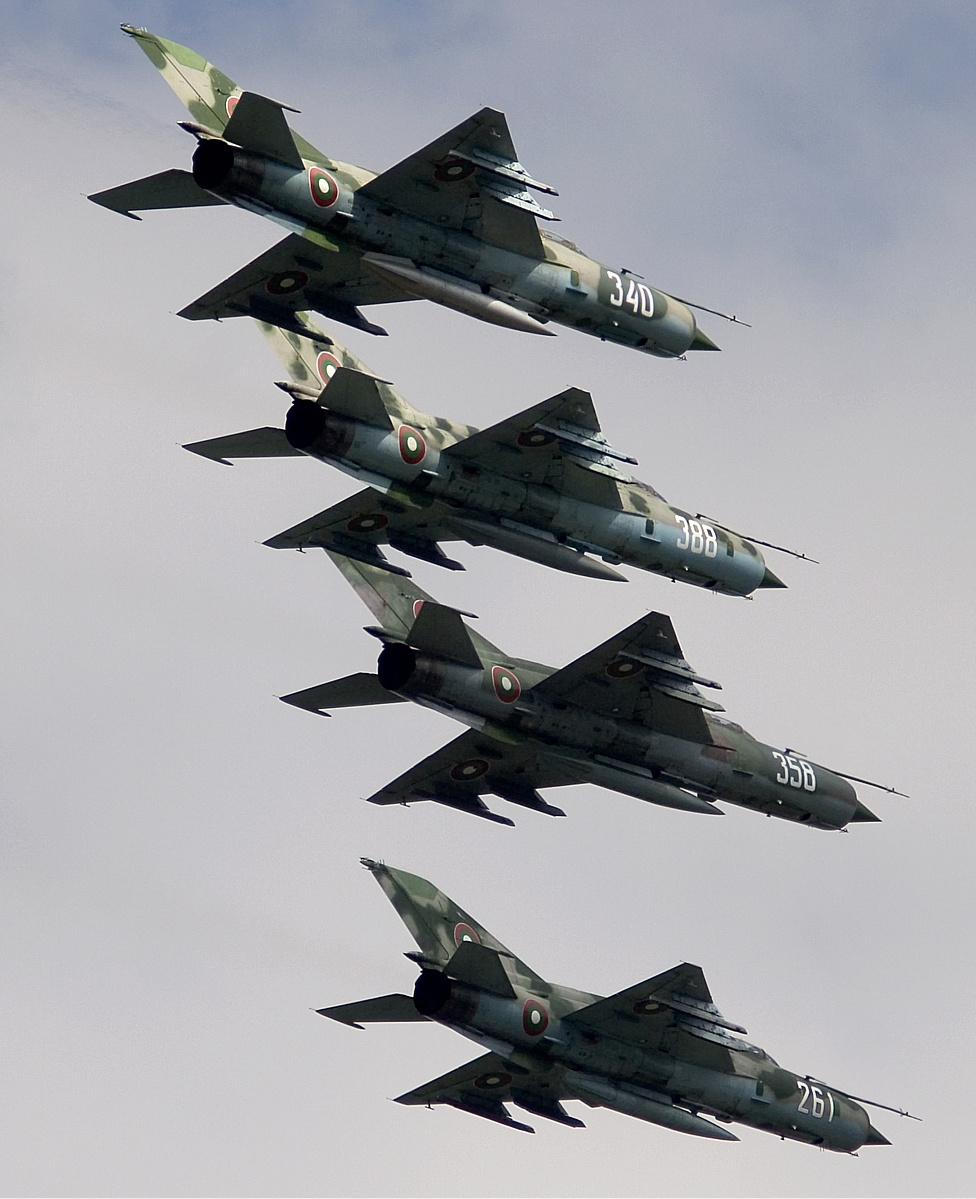
Bulgarian Air Force Mikoyan-Gurevich MiG-21bis

This article lists current and former operators of the Mikoyan-Gurevich MiG-21.

== Current operators ==
=== Libya ===
Libyan Air Force: 12 in service as of 2023. In 1976, Libya ordered 64 MiG-21bis fighters and MiG-21UM trainers. Nine of these were used to train and equip a force envisaged as the core of the future "Palestinian Air Force", which would be established once Palestine would have been "freed". 33 MiG-21s were still in service in 2006 according to an Israeli intelligence report; presently, there is one squadron, the 1021st based at Gamal Abdel Nasser AB near Tobruk, still operating MiG-21bis fighters and MiG-21UM trainers.

In 2014, Egypt delivered 7 MiG-21MFs to the Libyan National Army – Air Force. On 6 March 2016, six more ex-Egyptian Air Force MiG-21MFs arrived at Gamal Abdel Nasser Air Base. Together with several other Libyan MiG-21s these are operated from Gamal Abdul Nasser air base near Tobruk and have been used extensively in combat operations. At least three have been shot down or crashed since 1 January 2016. As of 2017, the LNA possessed 14 MiG-21s of which 3 were dual seat MiG-21UMs.

=== Mali ===
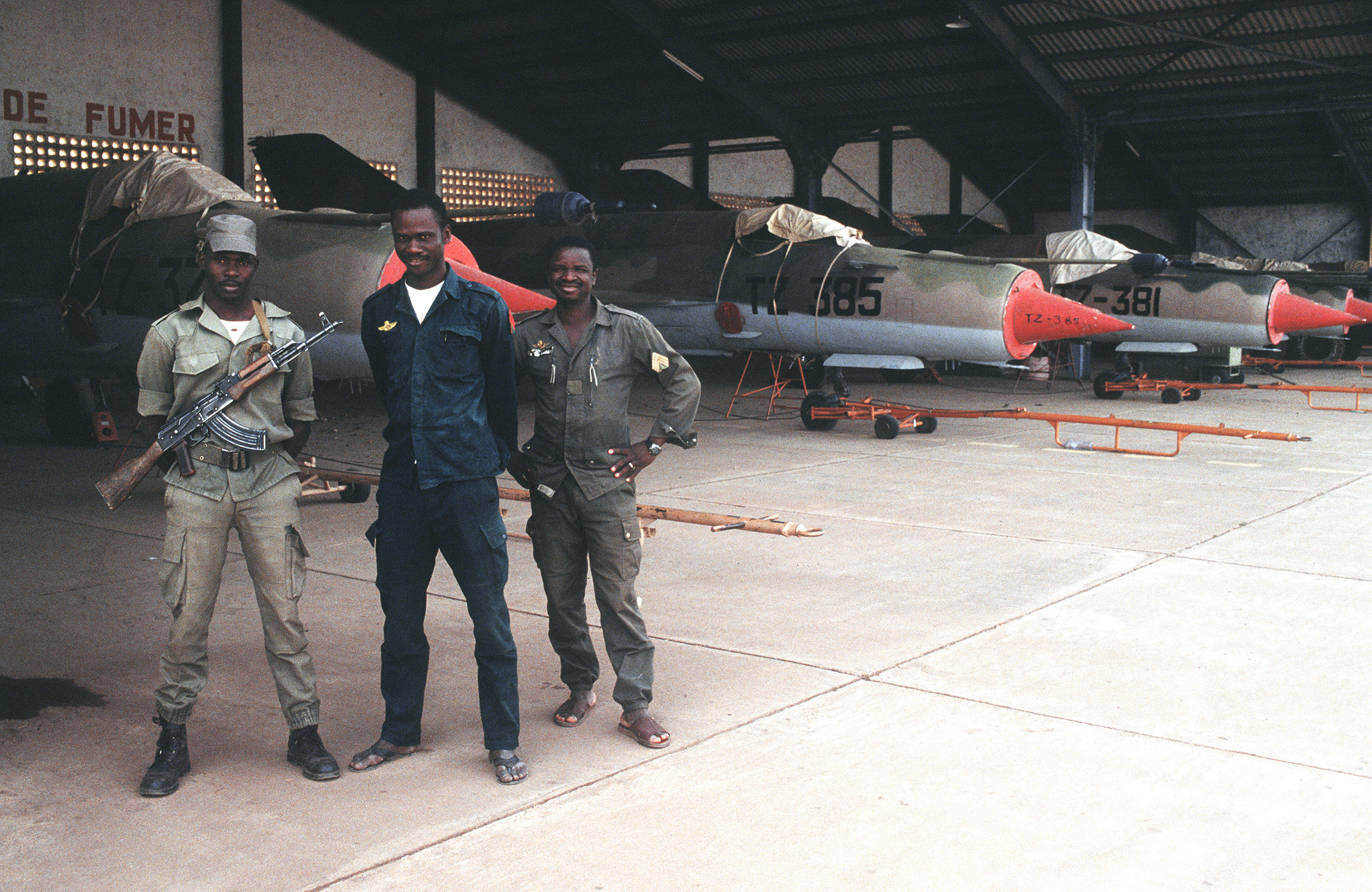
Malian MiG-21s in 1997

Malian Air Force: Twelve MiG-21bis and at least four MiG-21UM were delivered from the USSR, probably in 1985 or 1986, and two MiG-21MF arrived in 2005 from the Czech Republic, along with another MiG-21UM. As of December 2023, Mali has 9 MiG-21s in service.

=== Mozambique ===
Mozambique Air Force: 8 in service as of 2023. 48 MiG-21bis were delivered from the USSR starting in 1983, for use against the RENAMO guerrillas. After the 1990 ceasefire they were all put into storage, and most of them had become unserviceable by 1992. The Mozambique Air Force was listed as having eight MiG-21s operational in December 2021.

=== North Korea ===
Korean People's Army Air Force: 26 in service as of 2023. At least 200 MiG-21s, including 30 built in China, are generally accepted as having been delivered to the KPAAF. By 1966–67, 80 MiG-21F-13 were delivered, with the first 14 arriving in or before 1963. 65 MiG-21PFM were delivered 1968–1971 and 24 more in 1974. According to the US CIA, by 1977 there were a total of 120 MiG-21s in DPRK, but by 1983 this number had dropped to 50; 150 MiG-21PFM and MiG-21MF were reportedly delivered in 1985. In 1999, 38 MiG-21bis izdeliye 75A were delivered from Kyrgyzstan. In December 2021, 26 MiG-21s were listed as being in service by Flight International. 50 MiG-21 trainers of different variants were delivered, of which 30 are believed to be in service.

Though little is known about the North Korean air force, it is known that a KPAF MiG-21PFM shot down a US Army CH-47 helicopter on July 14, 1977. The KPAF also took part in the Vietnam War: A KPAF MiG-21 downed a USAF RF-4C on August 31, 1967; on January 14, 1968, another one shot down a USAF F-105D, and on February 12, 1968, a KPAF MiG-21 destroyed a USN F-4B.

== Former operators ==
=== Afghanistan ===
Afghan Air Force. The Democratic Republic of Afghanistan Air Force received 40 MiG-21F-13 (izd. 74) in 1973, and from 1979, 70 MiG-21MF (izd. 96F), 50 MiG-21bis (izd. 75A and 75B) and 6 MiG-21UM (izd. 69A) were delivered. Small numbers of aircraft left behind by the Soviet Air Force after their withdrawal were taken up by the DRAAF, including MiG-21PFS (izd. 94A) and MiG-21PFM (izd. 94A). Following the overthrow of the communist government, the armies of some warlords operated MiG-21s. The Islamic Emirate of Afghanistan Air Force was set up by the Taliban, and was known to have operated at least one MiG-21PFM, 8 MiG-21MF, 5 MiG-21bis, one MiG-21U (izd. 66-400) and three MiG-21UM. All are now out of service (derelict and/or destroyed).

MiG-21s were operated by the following units in the late 1980s:

- 322nd Fighter Regiment (FR) (Bagram):
  - 4 squadrons of 20 MiG-21MF/bis and 2 MiG-21UM each
- 393rd FR (Mazar-e-Sharif):
  - 3 squadrons of 20 MiG-21MF/PFM/bis and 2 MiG-21UM each

MiG-21s saw combat during the civil war in 1994 and 1995, with Northern Alliance MiG-21s destroying one MiG-21, three Su-22s and one other fighter belonging to the Dostum–Gulbuddin Militia Air Force; the DGMAF is known to have destroyed one NA MiG-21, the kill scored by a Su-22. The Taliban's IEAAF MiG-21s are known to have shot down two Mi-8 helicopters of the Northern Alliance, while an NA MiG-21 is credited with a kill of an IEAFF Su-20. Four DRAAF MiG-21s are known to have been shot down by Pakistani F-6s and Mirage IIIs in 1986.

=== Algeria ===
Algerian Air Force (QJJ). First received MiG-21F-13s starting in 1965, a total of 40 delivered; 20 were provided to Egypt in 1967 for the Six-Day War. Of these, six landed at an airbase just captured by the Israelis in the war – one pilot destroyed his plane, the other five were captured, and four of these were shipped to the US for evaluation by the USAF. In the late 1960s, some MiG-21FLs were delivered as well. Six MiG-21R were reportedly delivered, too. 52 MiG-21MF were also received, as well as some MiG-21UMs. 47 MiG-21bis' were ordered in 1975. Lastly, in 1978, an order was placed for 40 MiG-21s. Some MiG-21s were traded to Ukraine as part of a package for 36 MiG-29S; similar deals may have been made with Belarus, who provided Algeria with 36 more MiG-29S aircraft. The last MiG-21s were withdrawn from service by 2003.

Before 1993, MiG-21s served with the following units:

- 11e Escadron de Chasse (Fighter Squadron) - flying MiG-21FLs from Tindouf as of September 1973.
- 12e Escadron de Chasse - operating MiG-21FLs and MiG-21Rs from Aïn Oussera as of September 1973.
- 14e Escadron de Chasse (Tindouf) – MiG-21MF
- 15e Escadron de Chasse - flying MiG-21FLs from Béchar as of September 1973.
- 17e Escadron de Chasse - acting as MiG-21 operational conversion unit starting in 1974.
- 19e Escadron de Combat - multi-role unit flying MiG-21MFs from Bou Sfer as of September 1973.
- 23e Escadron de Combat - multi-role unit flying MiG-21MFs from Boufarik as of September 1973. Deployed to Egypt in October 1973 and disbanded afterwards.
- 120e Escadron de Chasse (Aïn Oussera)
- 140e Escadron de Chasse (Ouargla)
- 153e Escadron de Chasse (Bou Sfer)
- 630e Escadron de Chasse (Bou Sfer)

After 1993, MiG-21s were assigned to the following units:

- 113e Escadron de Chasse (Tindouf)
- 143e Escadron de Chasse (Ouargla)
- 153e Escadron de Chasse (Béchar)
- 193e Escadron de Chasse (Bou Sfer)

=== Angola ===
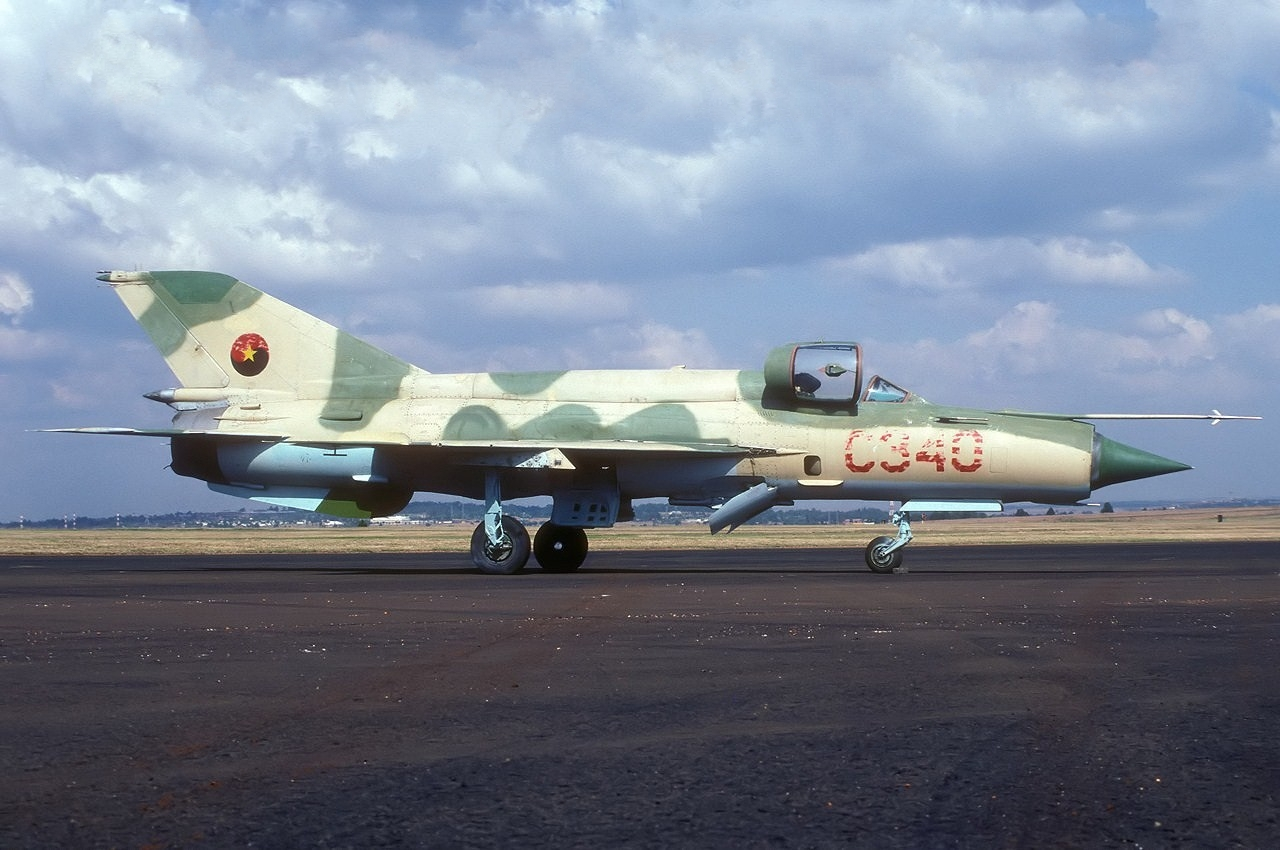
Angolan MiG-21bis

Angolan Air Force (FAPA-DAA): 23 in service as of 2023. The first MiG-21 deliveries to Angola included 12 MiG-21MFs, delivered from the USSR starting in January 1976. They belonged to a unit entirely staffed by Cubans. In 1981–1982, 20 MiG-21PFM fighters were delivered second-hand from the USSR, as well as two MiG-21UM trainers. In 1983, 30 MiG-21bis were delivered, followed by another 32 in 1984. Two MiG-21R reconnaissance aircraft were also delivered during the same period. They have been reported as having been phased out of service by 2007, although Flight International claimed that 23 MiG-21s remained active in December 2021.

MiG-21s served with the following units:

- 9th Fighter Training Squadron
- 24th Air Instructional Regiment
- 25th Air Combat Fighter Regiment
  - 11th Fighter Squadron
  - 12th Fighter Squadron - replaced by MiG-23 in 1987
  - 13th Fighter Squadron - replaced by MiG-23 in 1987

Little is known about the combat record of Angolan MiG-21s. On March 13, 1976, a pair of FAPA-DAA MiG-21MFs destroyed an Air Zaïre Fokker F27 on the ground at Lumbala Airport using S-24 rockets. Several Angolan MiG-21MFs are known to have been lost in air-to-air combat, all to the South African Air Force. The first one was shot down on November 6, 1981, by gunfire from a Mirage F1CZ flown by Johann Rankin. Another two MiG-21MFs were damaged on October 5, 1982, again by Mirage F1CZs. Although both of them returned safely to their base, they were subsequently written off.

=== Azerbaijan ===
Azerbaijan Air Force: 5 in service as of 2023. Around 12 received from Ukraine. Five were reportedly based at Kyurdamir and to be withdrawn following purchase of MiG-29s, but were still reported as being active in December 2021. The MiG-21 was phased out in 2023-24.

=== Bangladesh ===
Bangladesh Air Force. Received 12 MiG-21MF and 2 MiG-21UM second hand from Soviet Union in 1973.They were later phased out around 2006-2007, making way for newer aircraft like the F-7 BGI and MiG-29.

=== Bulgaria ===
A Bulgarian MiG-21bis taxis at Graf Ignatievo Air Base, Bulgaria during a bilateral exercise between the U.S. and Bulgarian air forces.

Bulgarian Air Force. From 1963 to 1990, Bulgaria received 224 MiG-21s. Six remained in service as of 2012. Bulgaria received 12 MiG-21F-13 in 1963; the surviving nine were converted to MiG-21F-13R standard as reconnaissance aircraft. The last six were retired in 1988 as life expired. 12 MiG-21PF were delivered in 1965; four were lost in accidents, the other eight were retired in 1991. 12 MiG-21PFM were received in 1965, followed by 32 more in 1977–1978 from Soviet surplus stock and two more in 1986; further, four MiG-21PFS were delivered from Soviet surplus; of the 46 MiG-21PFM and 4 MiG-21PFS, seven were lost in accidents and four were sold to Nigeria; the last active aircraft were withdrawn in 1992. Six MiG-21R were delivered in 1969 and retired in 1995. 15 MiG-21M were delivered in 1970 and retired in 1990. Twenty MiG-21MF were delivered in 1974–1975; seven were converted to MiG-21MFR standard in 1995; all withdrawn by 2000. Thirty MiG-21bis izdeliye 75B ("Fishbed-N") were delivered in 1983 and six more in 1985; thirty-six MiG-21bis izdeliye 75A ("Fishbed-L") were delivered in 1990 from Soviet AF stocks. 12 MiG-21bis izd. 75B remained in service with 1st Sqn 3rd IAB. A single MiG-21U izd. 66-400 was delivered in 1966, and a single MiG-21US in 1969, followed by four more MiG-21US in 1970. 27 MiG-21UM were delivered between 1974 and 1982. A few of these remained operational after having gunsights and weapons pylons removed and being redesignated MiG-21UM-2.

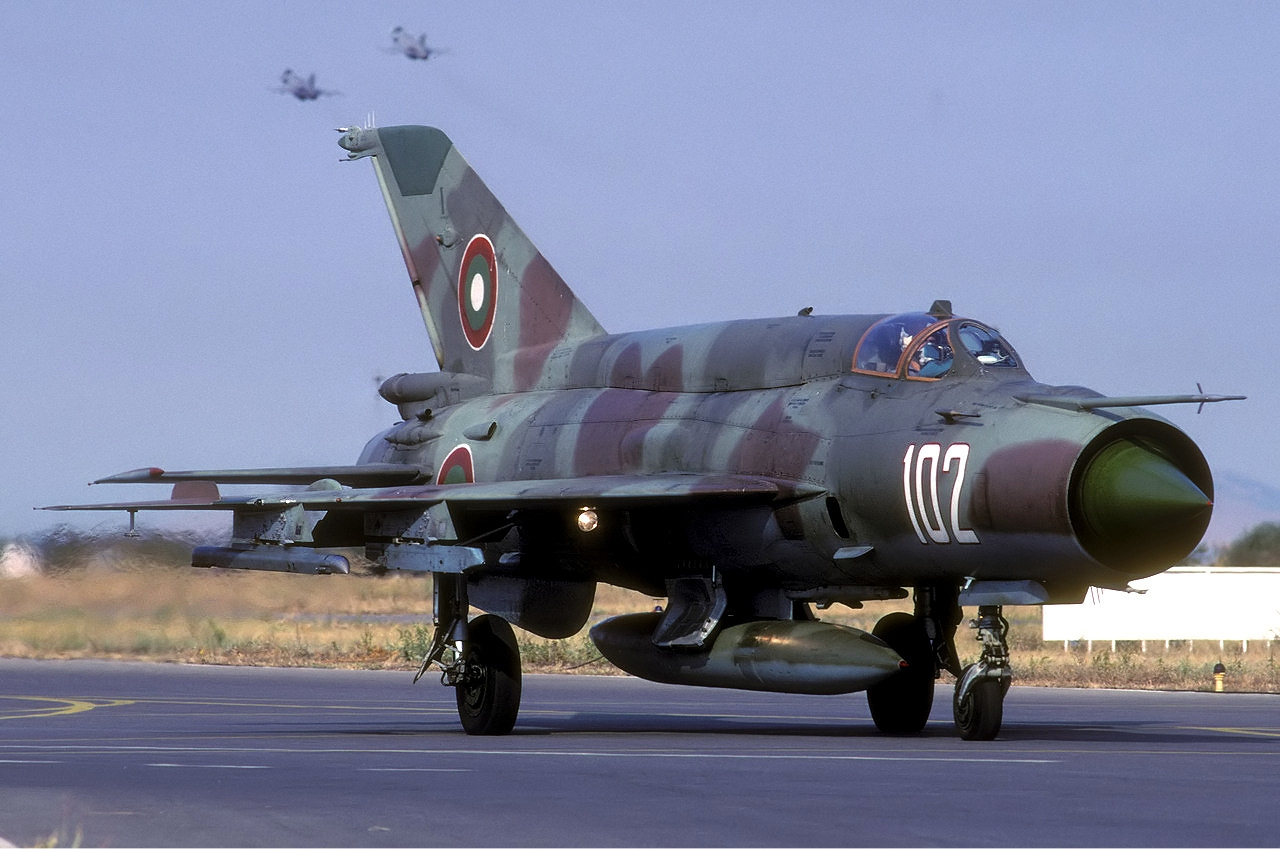
Bulgarian MiG-21bis

The following units operated MiG-21s in 1992:

- 2 IAE/15 IAP (Ravnets) – MiG-21bis (izd. 75A), MiG-21UM
- 3 IAE/15 IAP (Ravnets) – MiG-21bis (izd. 75A), MiG-21UM
- 1 IAE/19 IAP (Graf Ignatievo) – MiG-21bis (izd. 75B)
- 2 IAE/19 IAP (Graf Ignatievo) – MiG-21bis (izd. 75B)
- 1 RAE/26 IAP (Dobrich) – MiG-21MFR
- 12 Combat Training Regiment (Kamenets) – MiG-21PFM, MiG-21UM
  - (IAB = Iztrebitelna Aviatsionna Baza – Fighter Air Base; IAE = Iztrebitelna Avioeskadrila – Fighter Squadron; IAP = Iztrebitelen Aviopolk – Fighter Regiment; RAE – Razuznavatelna Avioeskadrila – Reconnaissance Squadron)

On 18 December 2015, Bulgaria retired their last three serviceable MiG-21s, two single-seat MiG-21bis' and a two-seat MiG-21UM1 trainer; the two fighters will remain available to conduct quick reaction alert sorties until 31 December, then be put in storage at Graf Ignatievo Air Base. The aircraft had been kept in service three years after they were originally slated for retirement due to airworthiness problems experienced by the MiG-29 fleet, but the cost of overhauling them further was rejected and efforts were redirected to maintaining the MiG-29. Bulgarian MiG-21 operations spanned 52 years.

=== Burkina Faso ===
Burkina Faso Air Force. Eight 'MiG-21bis' (izd. 75A) and two 'MiG-21UM' delivered in 1984; all non-operational by 1993.

In 1984, the following units were equipped with MiG-21s:

- Escadrille de Chasse ("Fighter Squadron") (Ouagadougou) – 8 MiG-21bis, 2 MiG-21UM.

=== Cambodia ===
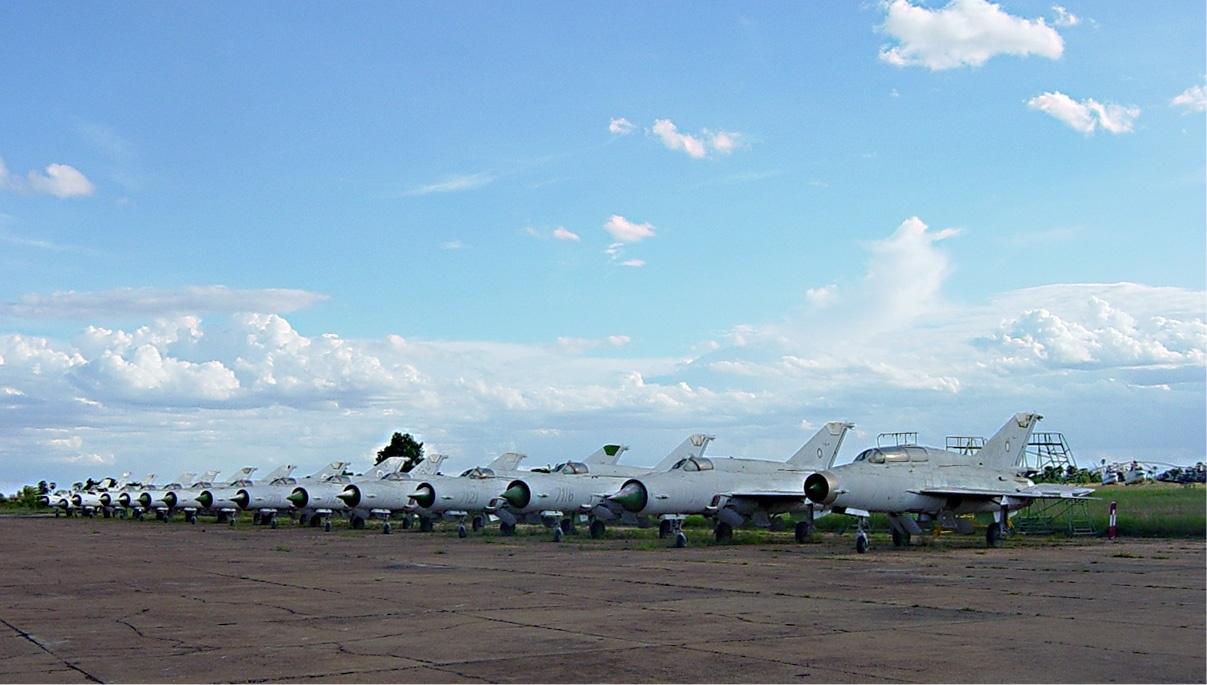
Lineup of 14 Cambodian Air Force MiG-21bis and one MiG-21U

Cambodian Air Force. Nineteen second-hand MiG-21bis (izd. 75B) and three MiG-21UM delivered from the USSR in 1982, as well as three MiG-21UM from Bulgaria in the same year. There are plans to modernise these in Israel, but so far only one MiG-21bis and one MiG-21UM have been rebuilt to MiG-21-2000 standard and returned to Cambodia. As of 2007, all MiG-21 are reported to be stored and out of service.

=== China ===
People's Liberation Army Air Force: Three complete 'MiG-21F-13' and 20 kits were sent from the USSR to China in 1961; the rest used by the PLAAF were all locally built Chengdu J-7 aircraft. Though only 23 "actual" aircraft were delivered from the USSR to China, they did see active service in the PLAAF and/or PLANAF; on January 3, 1966, a MiG-21F-13 of the PLANAF, flown by Lu Xiangxiao, shot down a USAF AQM-34 unmanned aerial vehicle using 57mm rockets.

=== Croatia ===
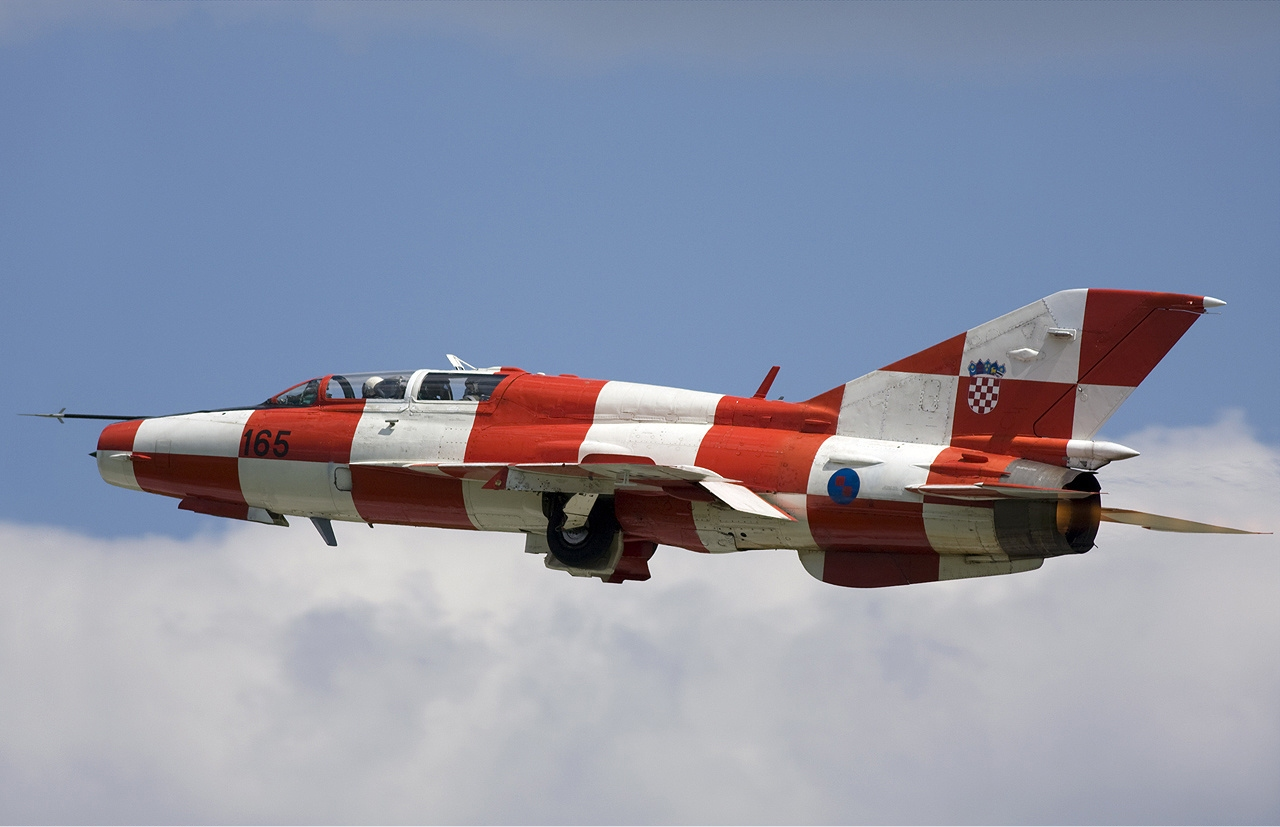
Croatian Air Force MiG-21UMD

Croatian Air Force (HRZ): Retired in July 2024 as received Rafale. 11 in service in 2023. Three MiG-21bis were taken up following defections of Croatian pilots from the Yugoslav Air Force in 1992. These were supplemented by 23 more MiG-21bis, one MiG-21US and three MiG-21UM acquired from former Soviet training units in Kyrgyzstan in 1993–1994. Three of these were lost in combat. In 2003, eight MiG-21bis were upgraded to MiG-21bis-D standard by Aerostar in Romania, while four MiG-21UMs, obtained from Kyrgyzstan via Aerostar, were upgraded to MiG-21UMD standard. In 2013, three Croatian MiG-21bis-Ds and four Mig-21UMDs were sent to Odesa in Ukraine for overhaul, with five more aircraft supplied by Ukraine and upgraded to Mig-21bis-D standard. 11 MiG-21s remain in service as of 2023. The Croatian Air Force has ordered 12 second-hand Dassault Rafales to replace the MiG-21, with the replacement scheduled once the Rafales are delivered in 2024–25. In 2003, MiG-21s were found with the following units (ZB = Zrakoplovna Baza – Air Base; ELZ – Eskadrila Lovačkih Zrakoplova – Fighter Squadron):

- 91 ZB/21 ELZ (Zagreb-Pleso)

=== Republic of the Congo ===
Congolese Air Force: Reportedly 14 'MiG-21bis' (izd. 75B) and two 'MiG-21UM' were delivered starting in 1988; all out of use by 1997.

=== Cuba ===
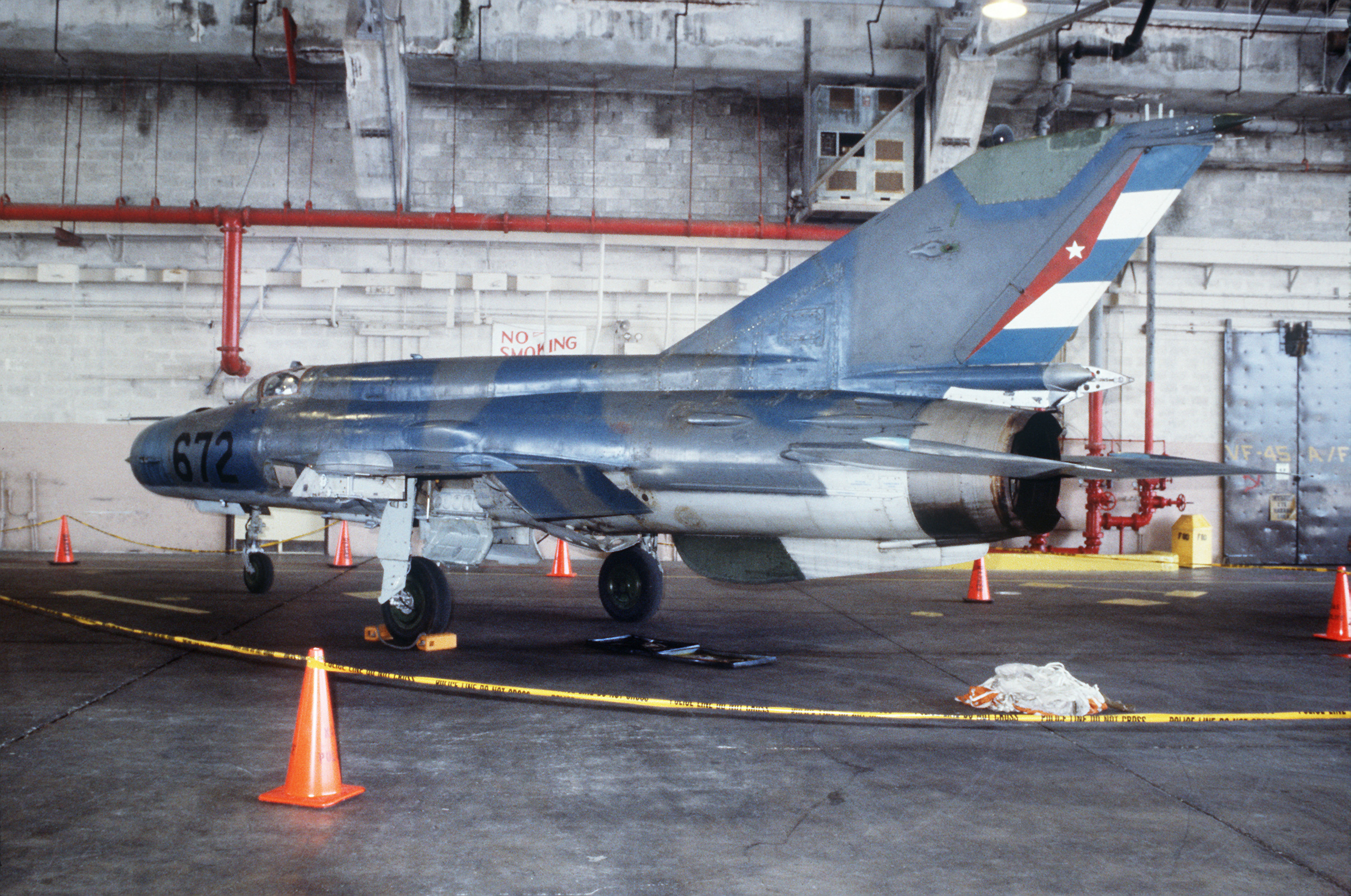
A left side view of a Cuban MiG-21 fighter aircraft inside VF-45 hangar. It was flown to Key West on September 20, 1993, by a defecting Cuban pilot

Cuban Air Force: In 1962, 44 MiG-21F-13s were transferred to the Revolutionary Air Defense Forces (DAAFAR). From 1964 to 1967, 12 MiG-21PFMs were received. Subsequently, a possible MiG-21PFMA was delivered from Poland, but was replaced by MFs. In 1966, two MiG-21U (izd . 66-400) and two MiG-21U (izd . 66-600) were delivered. In 1968, four MiG-21Rs were delivered. Between 1972 and 1974, 60 MiG-21MFs were delivered, forming two squadrons, one of which was sent to Angola. From 1981, 72 MiG-21bis (izd . 75A) were received. In 1968, six MiG-21UMs were delivered.There were also plans to introduce the MiG-21US, but these were abandoned due to the availability of other training aircraft. In total, there are 202 aircraft of all series, but according to Cuban sources, DAAFAR has an additional 68 aircraft of all types to replace aircraft lost in accidents or defections during service, meaning that a total of 270 MiG-21s were sent to the Cuban Air Force. After the collapse of the Soviet Union in 1991, the number of operational aircraft rapidly decreased through cannibalization. In 1994, only some of the MiG-21bis were retired. In 1995, all of the MiG-21F-13s, which did not have radar, were retired. Some of the aircraft were subsequently put into reserve and supplemented. Two MiG-21PFMs (s/n:384, s/n:1006) were donated to museums, while the remaining ten were sent to North Korea. All of Cuba's fixed-wing aircraft were retired in 2026.

In 1990, MiG-21s were known to be assigned to the following units:

- 1a Brigada de Guardia "Batalla de Sta Clara"
  - 11o Regimiento de Caza (Santa Clara)
    - 111o Escuadrone
    - 112o Escuadrone
- 2a Brigada de Guardia "Playa Girón"
  - 22o Regimiento de Caza (Baracoa)
    - 221o Escuadrone
    - 222o Escuadrone
- 3a Brigada de Guardia "Cuartel Moncada"
  - 31o Regimiento de Caza (Camagüey)
    - 311o Escuadrone
    - 312o Escuadrone

=== Czechoslovakia ===
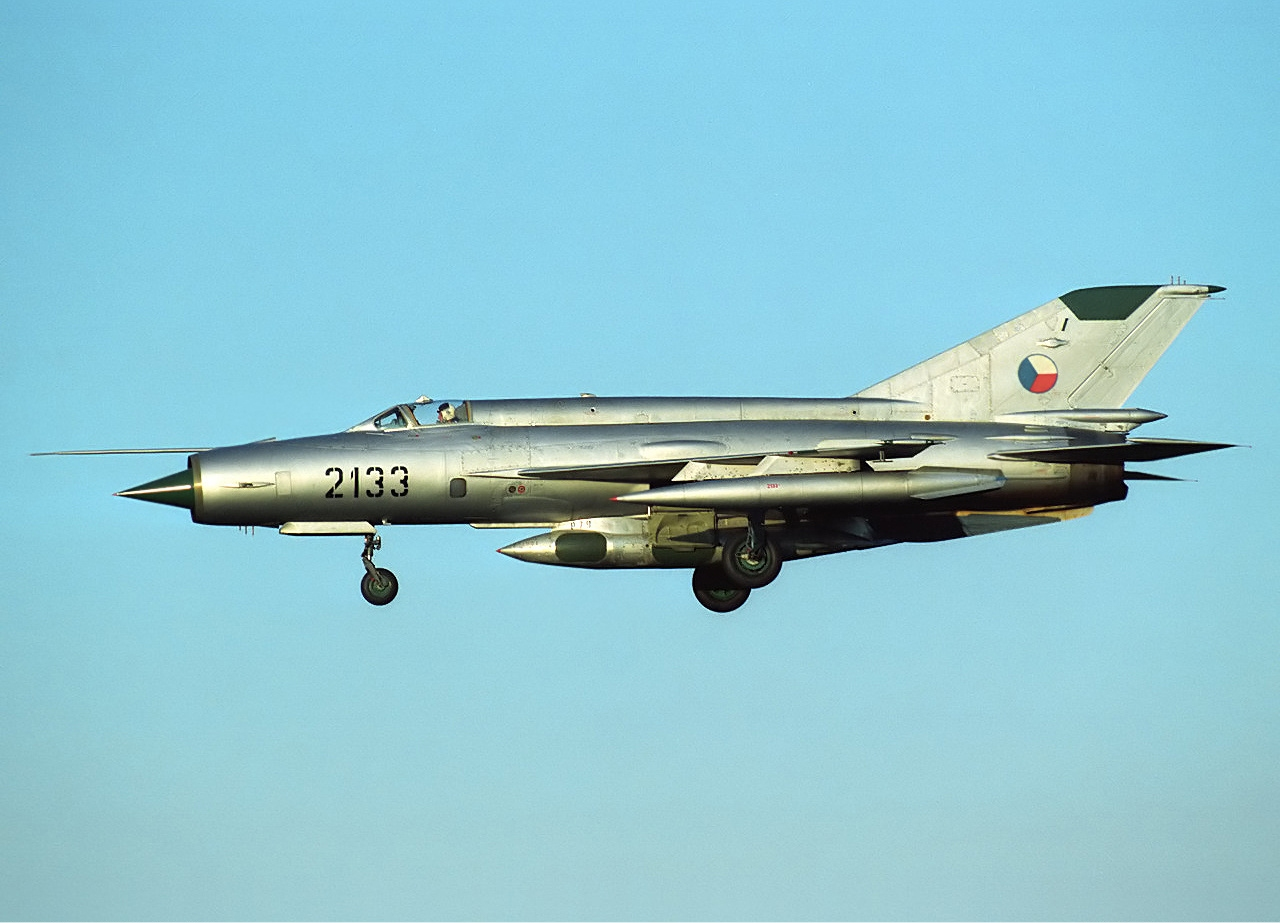
MiG-21R

Czechoslovak Air Force. All aircraft passed on to Czech Republic and Slovakia. First version to operate with CSAF was the locally built Avia S-106 (= 'MiG-21F-13'); 194 were built, and some were converted to 'MiG-21FR' standard. 40 'MiG-21PF' were delivered from 1964, retired by 1990. 'MiG-21PFM', including nine nuclear-capable aircraft, were delivered between 1966 and 1969; all were retired by 1991. 25 'MiG-21R' were delivered between 1969 and 1972, retired between 1992 and 1994. 24 'MiG-21M' were delivered which were later upgraded to 'MiG-21MA' standard. 102 'MiG-21MF' were delivered. Three 'MiG-21U' izdeliye 66-400 and eight of izdeliye 66-600 were received, followed by 13 'MiG-21US' and 32 'MiG-21UM'. An Avia S-106 flown by a J. Foks is credited with the downing of a US Air Force aircraft violating Czechoslovak airspace in September 1963.

=== Czech Republic ===
Czech Air Force. Ten 'MiG-21MF' were upgraded to 'MiG-21MFN' standard with NATO avionics; these were retired in 2005, replaced by the Saab JAS 39 Gripen.

=== East Germany ===
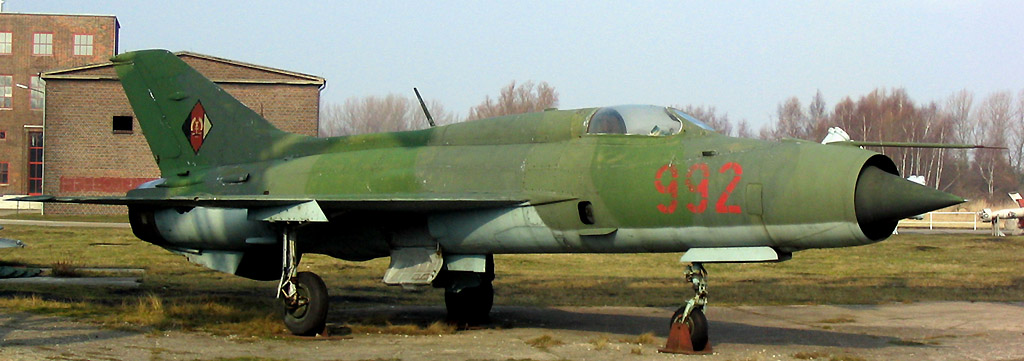
MiG-21PFM with NVA markings

East German Air Force (LSK/NVA): 251 MiG-21s of seven versions were handed over to the Luftwaffe upon reunification; these were rapidly phased out of service. The LSK/NVA first received 75 'MiG-21F-13' in 1962–64, 52 'MiG-21PF', 83 'MiG-21PFM' without cannon (locally designated 'MiG-21SPS') and 56 with cannon (locally designated 'MiG-21SPS-K'), 89 'MiG-21M', 68 'MiG-21MF', 14 'MiG-21bis' izdeliye 75A and 32 izdeliye 75B, 14 'MiG-21U' izdeliye 66-400 and 31 izdeliye 66-600, 17 'MiG-21US' and 37 'MiG-21UM'.

The following units operated MiG-21s:

- 1st Air Defence Division (HQ Cottbus)
  - JG-1 (Holzdorf) – MiG-21MF, MiG-21SPS (PFM), MiG-21UM
  - JG-3 (Preschen) – MiG-21MF, MiG-21UM
  - JG-7 (Drewitz) – MiG-21M, MiG-21UM
  - JG-8 (Marxwalde) – MiG-21bis, MiG-21UM
- 3rd Air Defence Division (HQ Neubrandenburg)
  - JG-2 (Neubrandenburg) – MiG-21M, MiG-21SPS (PFM), MiG-21UM
- Fighter-Bomber & Air Transport Command (HQ Cottbus)
  - TAFS-47 (Drewitz) – MiG-21M, MiG-21UM
  - TAFS-87 (Preschen) – MiG-21M, MiG-21UM
- Air Force Training Command (HQ Kamenz)
  - FAG-15 (Rothernburg – MiG-21SPS (PFM), MiG-21U, MiG-21US, MiG-21UM

=== Egypt ===
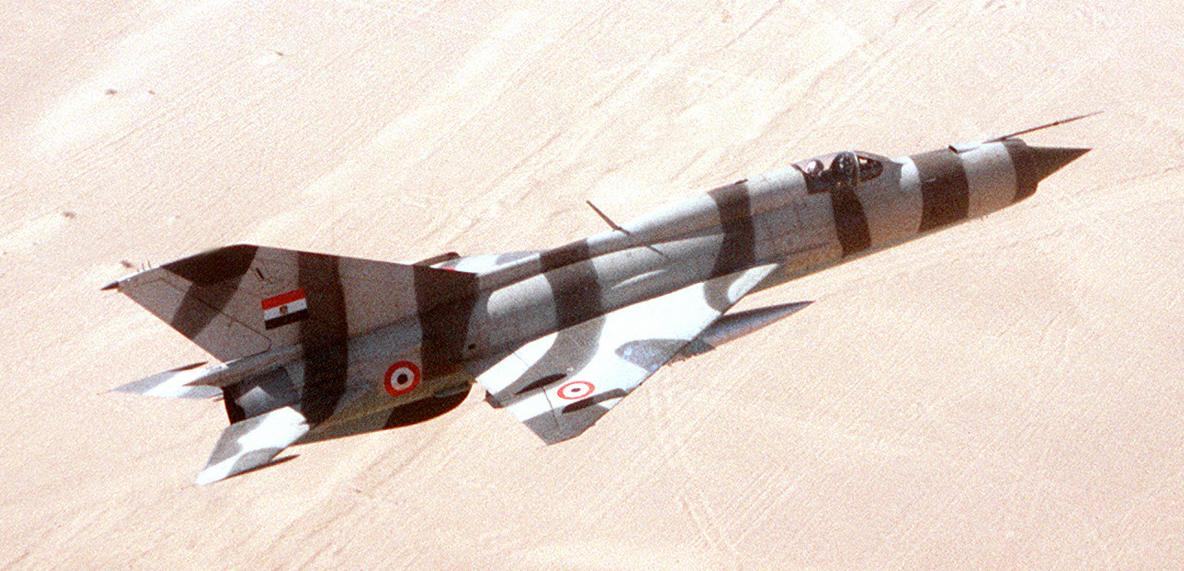
Egyptian MiG-21PFM

Egyptian Air Force: By 1967, Egypt had received 235 MiG-21 fighters (MiG-21F-13, MiG-21PF, MiG-21PFM) and 40 MiG-21U trainers. Almost all were destroyed in the Six-Day War – no more than 10 of the 235 survived that war. 75 MiG-21PFS were supplied in 1970, followed by 12 MiG-21M, 110 MiG-21MF, 24 MiG-21US, and some MiG-21UM.; eighty Chinese J-7 were also received. Egypt's remaining MiG-21 fighters were apparently taken out of service sometime after 2010, a few were given to the Libyan National Army's air force.

During the '80s the Egyptian Air Force operated the F-7B and MiG-21s in two Brigades/Wings:

- 102. Fighter Brigade (Inshas, moved to Fayid in 1979)
  - 25. Squadron – F-7B/FT-7 (Fayid, Hurghada)
  - 26. Squadron – F-7B/FT-7 (Fayid)
  - 35. Squadron – MiG-21MF (Hurghada)
- 104. Fighter Brigade (El Mansoura)
  - 42. Squadron – F-7B/FT-7 (El Mansoura)
  - 44. Squadron – F-7B/FT-7 (El Mansoura, Mersa Matruh)
  - 46. Squadron – MiG-21MF (Aswan)

After the October War in 1973, the Egyptian Air Force operated the MiG-21 in three brigades.

- 102. Fighter Brigade (Inshas)
  - 25. Squadron – MiG-21MF/MiG-21UM
  - 26. Squadron – MiG-21MF/MiG-21UM
  - 27. Squadron – MiG-21MF/MiG-21UM
- 104. Fighter Brigade (El Mansoura)
  - 42. Squadron – MiG-21MF/MiG-21UM
  - 44. Squadron – MiG-21MF/MiG-21UM
  - 46. Squadron – MiG-21MF/MiG-21UM
- 111. Fighter Brigade (Beni Sueif)
  - 45. Squadron – MiG-21MF/MiG-21UM
  - 47. Squadron – MiG-21MF/MiG-21UM
  - 49. Squadron – MiG-21MF/MiG-21UM

During the October War in 1973, the Egyptian Air Force operated the following MiG-21 units:

- 102. Fighter Brigade (Inshas)
  - 25. Squadron – MiG-21F-13/MiG-21UM (Wadi Qena)
  - 26. Squadron – MiG-21F-13/MiG-21UM (Inshas)
  - 27. Squadron – MiG-21F-13/MiG-21UM (Abu Hammad)
- 104. Fighter Brigade (El Mansoura)
  - 42. Squadron – MiG-21MF/MiG-21UM (Luxor)
  - 44. Squadron – MiG-21PFS/MiG-21U (Tanta)
  - 46. Squadron – MiG-21MF/MiG-21UM (El Mansoura)
- 111. Fighter Brigade (Beni Sueif)
  - 45. Squadron – MiG-21PFS/MiG-21U (Katamiya)
  - 47. Squadron – MiG-21PFM/MiG-21U (Beni Sueif)
  - 49. Squadron – MiG-21MF/MiG-21UM (Beni Sueif)
- 123. Reconnaissance Brigade (Genaclis)
  - 22. Squadron – MiG-21RF (Genaclis)
- 203. Fighter Brigade (Bilbeis)
  - 56. Squadron – MiG-21MF/MiG-21UM (Abu Hammad)
  - 82. Squadron – MiG-21MF/MiG-21UM (Abu Hammad)

=== Ethiopia ===
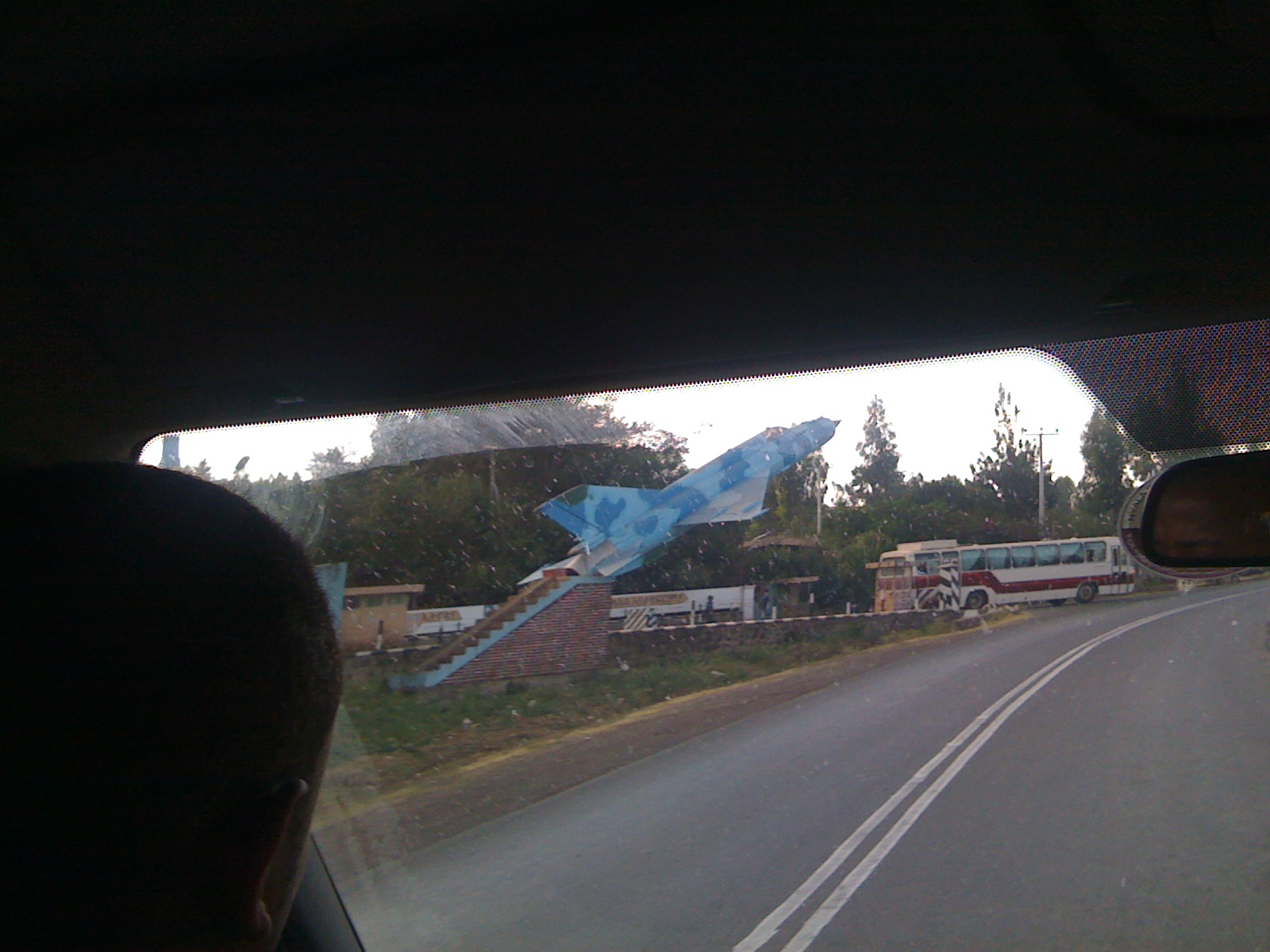
MiG-21 of the Ethiopian Air Force

Ethiopian Air Force: 48 MiG-21MF and MiG-21UM received 1977–1978; more – reports range from 50 to 150 – were delivered in 1982–83. Thirty MiG-21bis (izd. 75A) delivered between 1986 and 1988. MiG-21 order of battle as of 2007 (total 18 fighters and 6 trainers):

- 3rd Air Regiment (Dire Dawa)
- ? Air Regiment (Debre Zeyit)

By 2014, all MiG-21s had been retired, as per Flight International's World Air Forces 2014 report.

=== Finland ===
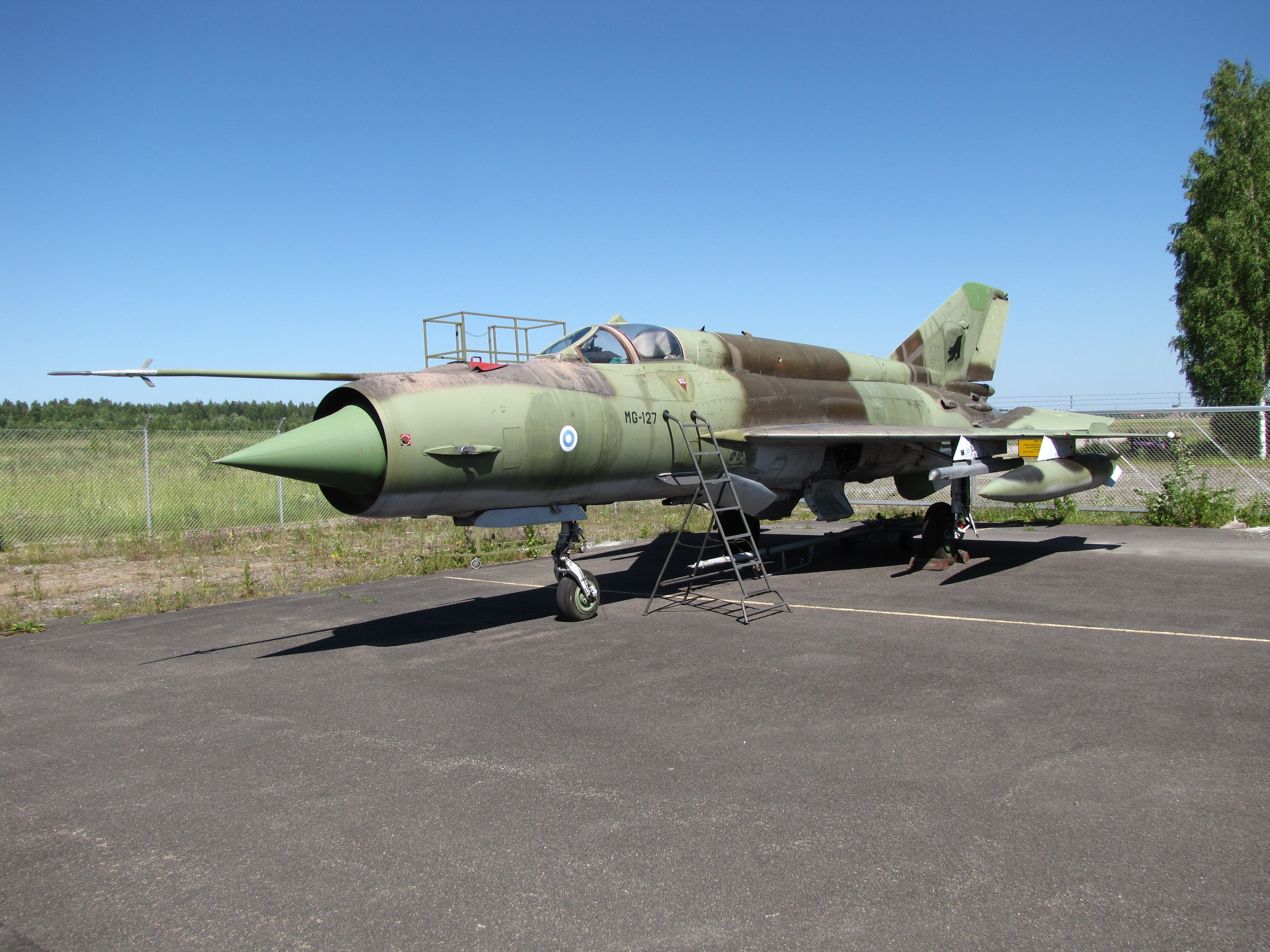
MiG-21bis serial number MG-127. The lynx on the tail fin is the insignia of Fighter Squadron 31

Finnish Air Force. Fighters: MiG-21bis Fishbed-N (26; 1977–1998), MiG-21F-13 Fishbed-C (22; 1963–1986), Trainers: MiG-21UM Mongol-B (2; 1974–1998), MiG-21US Mongol-B (2; 1981–1997), MiG-21UTI Mongol-A (2; 1965–1997). Six of the MiG-21bis were converted to 'MiG-21MGBT' reconnaissance standard. All aircraft were operated by HävLLv 3. Finland was the first country outside the Warsaw Pact to buy MiG-21, after Finland had rejected the MiG-19. The Soviet Union offered the brand-new Fishbed-C, and training of Finnish pilots by Soviet air force pilots began, only to stop after the start of the Cuban Missile Crisis, when the Soviet Union put its pilots on stand-by alert, and the Finnish Air force decided that training could continue in Finland without Soviet trainers.

=== Germany ===
Luftwaffe. Aircraft taken over from East German Air Force upon reunification. All received registration numbers (2x xx), but only those that were in operation received the full Luftwaffe serials with the Iron Cross painted on (2x + xx).

=== Georgia ===
Georgian Air Force. Two MiG-21UM were retained by Tbilaviamsheni factory and reportedly transferred to Georgian Air Force.

=== Guinea ===
Air Force of Guinea: 3 in service as of 2023. 8 'MiG-21MF' and one 'MiG-21U' delivered in 1986. Five restored to airworthy condition in Russia and returned to service; one of these crashed into a TV tower in 2007. Three still in service as of December 2021.

=== Guinea-Bissau ===
Air Force of Guinea-Bissau: Six 'MiG-21MF' and one 'MiG-21UM' were delivered from Soviet surplus in the late 1980s. All are out of service.

=== Hungary ===
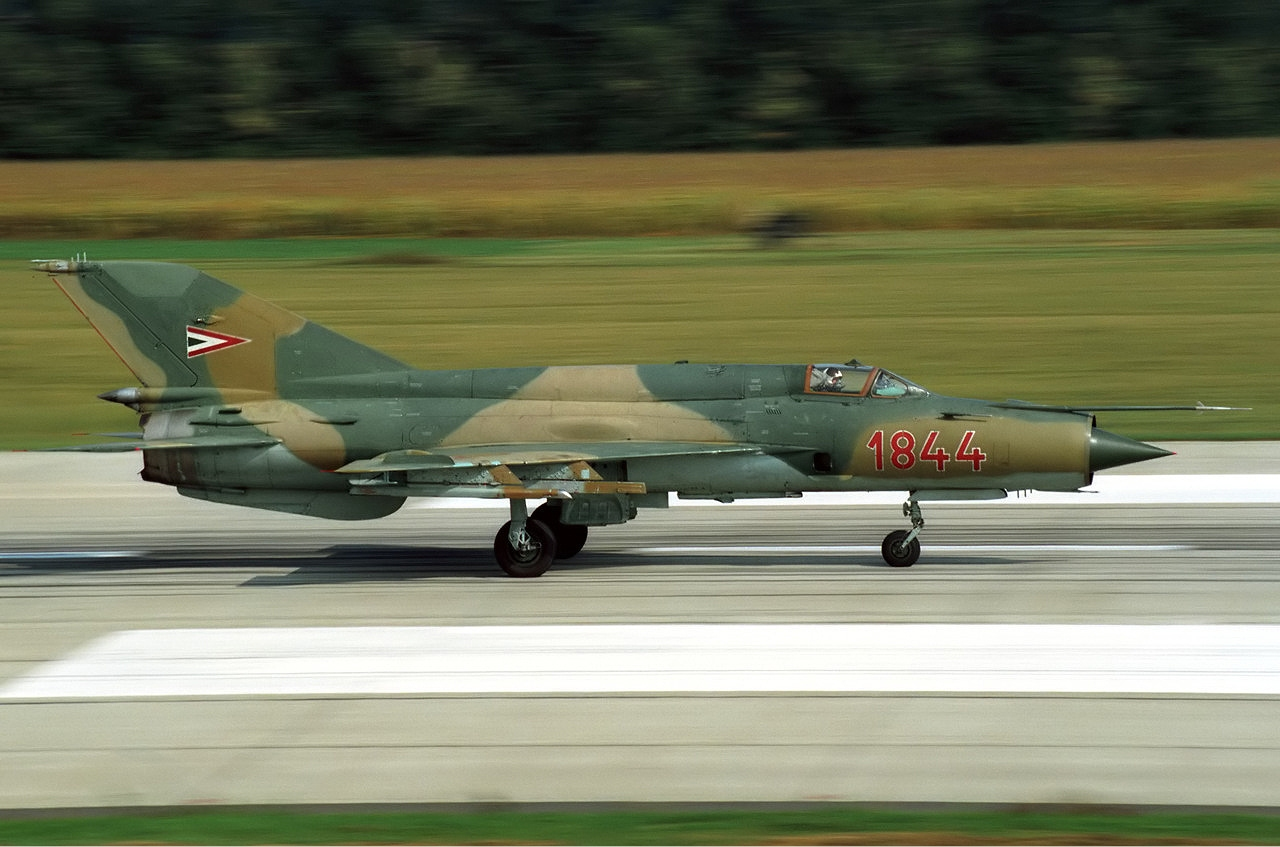
Hungarian Air Force Mikoyan-Gurevich MiG-21bis.

Hungarian Air Force. Hungary was the first Warsaw Pact country to receive the 'MiG-21F-13', receiving 12 in 1961, followed by 68 more; all were retired by 1980. In 1964–65 24 'MiG-21PF' were delivered, the last of these being retired in December 1988. Hungary was the only Warsaw Pact nation not to receive any MiG-21PFM or MiG-21M; the next type received was the 'MiG-21MF', of which 50 were delivered between 1971 and 1974, and were retired in 1996. 39 'MiG-21bis' izdeliye 75A and 24 of izdeliye 75B were delivered from 1977, the last of these were retired in 2001. Of trainer variants, 12 'MiG-21U' izdeliye 66-400 and six izdeliye 66-600, as well as 27 'MiG-21UM' were delivered; the last of them were withdrawn in 2001.

Other sources claim different distribution between variants: 116 F-13, 15 PF, 50 MF, 52 Bis, 16 (or 18) U, 24 UM, 20 US.

Late 1973 (after Yom Kippur war) Hungary donated free of charge 12 PFs to Syria from inventory of Kecskemét AFB. In total 72 MiG-21s destroyed and 32 pilots were deceased during Hungarian service. Most of the accidents were caused by fatal engine failure.

In 1991, MiG-21s operated with the following units (HRE = Harcászati Repülő Ezred – Combat Air Regiment; VSz = Vadászrepülő Század – Fighter Squadron):

- 31. HRE "Kapos" (Taszár)
  - 1. VSz "Boszorkány" ("Witch") – 10 MiG-21bis, 2 MiG-21UM
  - 2. VSz "Turul" – 10 MiG-21bis, 2 MiG-21UM
- 47. HRE "Pápa" (Pápa)
  - 2. VSz "Griff" ("Griffon") – 10 MiG-21bis, 2 MiG-21UM
- 59. HRE "Szentgyörgyi Dezső" (Kecskemét
  - 1. VSz "Puma" – 10 MiG-21MF, 2 MiG-21UM
  - 2. VSz "Dongó" ("Wasp") – 10 MiG-21bis, 2 MiG-21UM

At 2000, the disposition was as follows:

- 47. HRE (Pápa)
  - 1. VSz "Sámán" ("Shaman") – 12 MiG-21bis in fighter role
  - 2. VSz "Griff" – 10 MiG-21UM in ground attack role

=== India ===
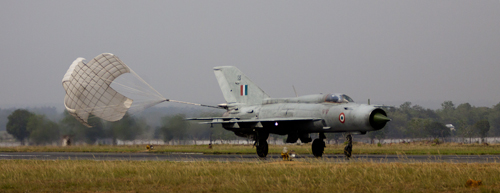
MiG 21 Type 77 of the Indian Air Force landing.

Indian Air Force: India received its first MiG-21s in 1963, numbering 8 MiG-21F-13s. Two more F-13s and two MiG-21PF were received in 1964, called the Type 74 and the Type 76 respectively in the IAF. The MiG-21FL, or the Type 77, was designed by Mikoyan to fulfill an Indian requirement, and this was the first version to be licence-built in India by HAL. The first 54 of these were built and test-flown in the USSR, then dismantled and shipped to India for reassembly; the first one built completely from scratch in India was handed over to the IAF in October 1970. All told, 205 MiG-21FL were built in India, of which 196 were built entirely in India; the last MiG-21FLs were retired in 2013. In 1971, 65 MiG-21M were delivered to India; licence production of an improved variant unique to India, designated MiG-21MF (Type 96), began in 1973 and lasted until 1981 – a total of 158 were built. The HAL MiG-21MF (Type 96) is not the same as the MiG-21MF (izdeliye 96) that was made in the USSR for export to other countries.

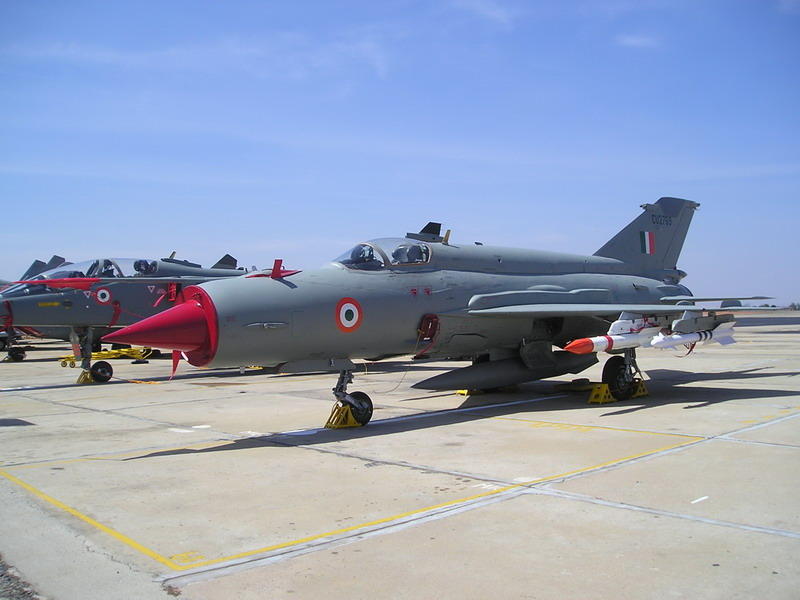
IAF MiG-21 Bison

Kits for 75 MiG-21bis izdeliye 75A were delivered in 1977, and by 1984, 220 more were built from scratch in India. Contracts were signed in 1996 to upgrade 125 MiG-21bis (plus an option for 50 more) in a service life extension program to extend their useful life to 2017; the first two were upgraded by Sokol in Russia, the remainder by HAL; 94 were completed by January 2006. This upgraded version was known originally as MiG-21UPG and finally as MiG-21 Bison. A total of 45 MiG-21U (Trainers, versions Types 66/66A) of both izdeliye 66-400 and 66-600 were delivered, including five bought from Ukraine in 1997. Seventy MiG-21UM Trainers (versions Types 69/69A/69B) were received, including some received from eastern Europe in the 1990s. Squadrons known to have operated the MiG-21 Bison include

- No.3 Squadron IAF "Cobras"
- No. 4 Squadron IAF "Oorials"
- No. 15 Squadron IAF "Flying Lances"
- No.21 Squadron IAF "Ankush"
- No.23 Squadron IAF "Cheetahs"
- No.24 Squadron IAF "Hunting Hawks"
- No.26 Squadron IAF "Warriors"
- No.32 Squadron IAF "Thunderbirds"
- No. 35 Squadron IAF "Rapiers"
- No.37 Squadron IAF "Black Panthers"
- No.45 Squadron IAF "Flying Daggers"
- No. 51 Squadron IAF "Sword Arms".

In total, the IAF inducted 874 MiG-21 across several variants, including T-66, T-77, T-69, T-96, T-75, and the modernized Bison version. The final aircraft were retired on 26 September 2025, ending over six decades of service in the IAF.

=== Indonesia ===
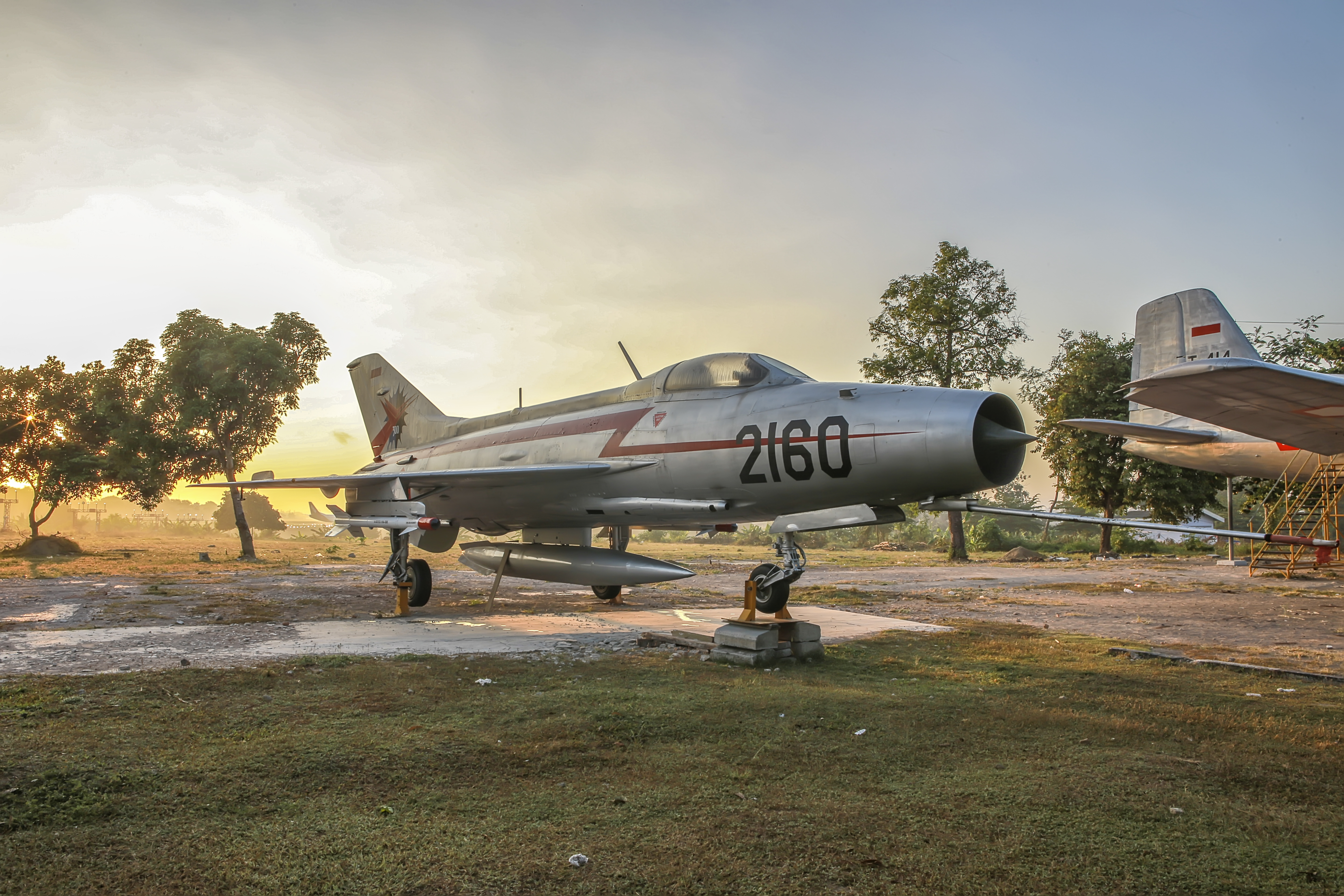
Indonesian Air Force MiG-21 in the Yogyakarta Air Force Museum

Indonesian Air Force. Twenty 'MiG-21F-13' and two 'MiG-21U' izdeliye 66-400 were received in 1962 and used during the preparation of Operation Trikora in 1962 in Western New Guinea (now Papua and Papua Barat). The aircraft were largely grounded in 1969 due to deteriorating bilateral relation and spare part embargo by the Soviet Union and removed from service in 1970. At least 13 of the F-13s and one U were transferred to the US for test purposes. The ex-Indonesian Air Force MiG-21F-13s were employed in 4477th Test and Evaluation Squadron as YF-110B.

=== Iran ===
Iranian Air Force had purchased 2 MiG-21PFM and 37 MiG-21F (23 like for Chinese version for J-7) and some 18 aircraft and 5 MiG-21U (FT-7 for Chinese Version like 4 purchased aircraft).

=== Iraq ===
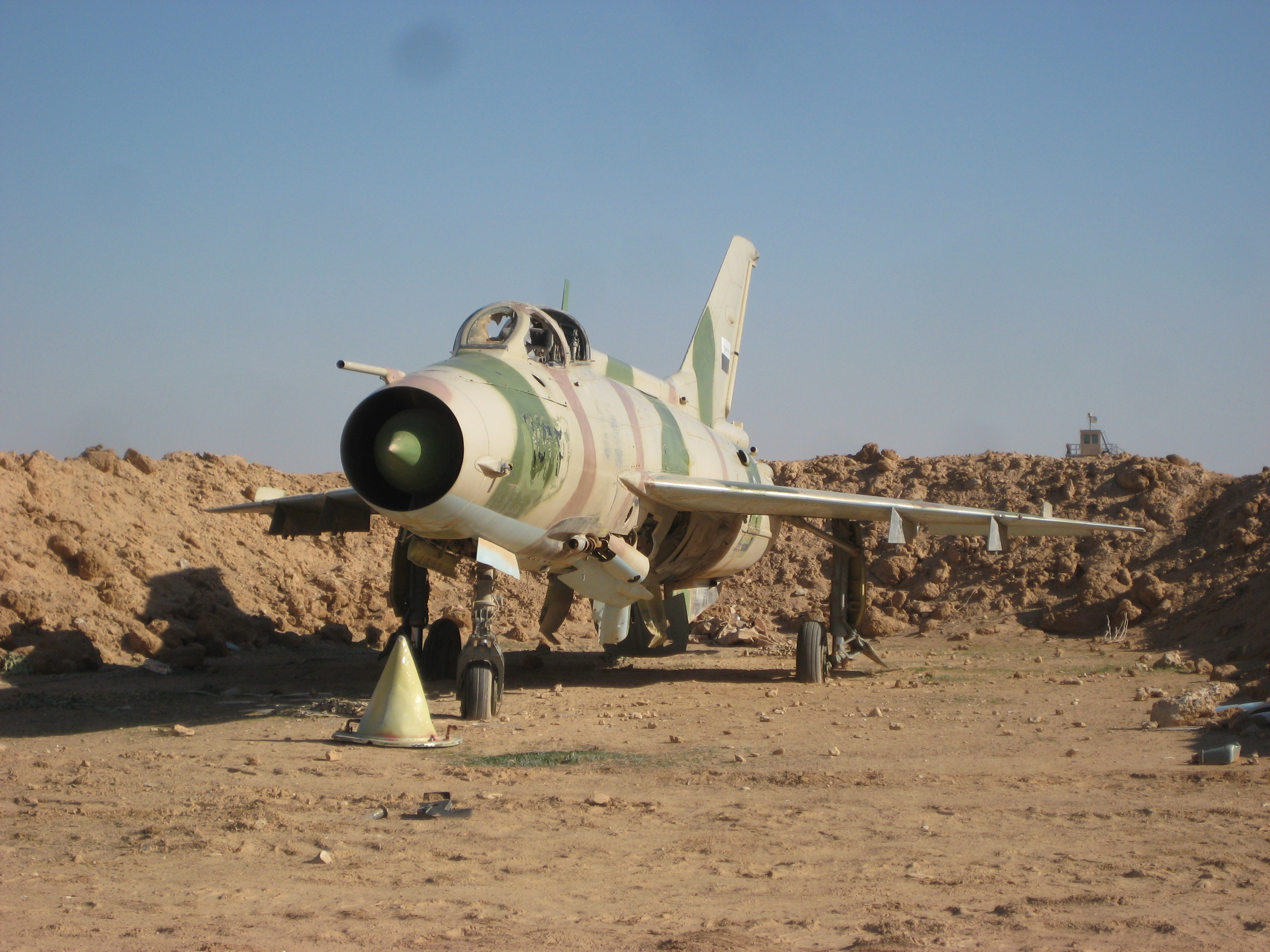
Derelict Iraqi Chengdu F-7M, a Chinese-made version of the MiG-21, at Al Asad Airbase.

Iraqi Air Force. Iraq received its first 16 MiG-21F-13s in 1962; one of these is the famous "007" aircraft that defected to Israel and was subsequently transferred to the USA. A contract for 19 additional aircraft was signed in 1965. Starting in late 1966, 22 more MiG-21F-13s and 23 MiG-21FLs were delivered. The first eight MiG-21PFMs were delivered in 1967, and more aircraft of this version followed in 1969 and 1970. In 1969, no less than 98 MiG-21MFs and 12 MiG-21UMs were ordered. Due to high international demand for this type, the MiG-21MF deliveries lasted until 1974–1975. In 1976, four MiG-21R reconnaissance aircraft were delivered. In 1978, as part of the biggest Iraqi-Soviet arms deal ever, 54 MiG-21bis were ordered. These were delivered between late 1979 and August 1980. A total of 61 'MiG-21bis' (izdeliye 75A) were delivered from 1983; some of these were found in 1990 in Dresden, Germany for overhaul, and four others at Batajnica, Yugoslavia. The East German Air Force (and subsequently, the Luftwaffe) had planned to sell surplus trainer variants to Iraq, but this fell through after the Iraqi invasion of Kuwait. At least 10 'MiG-21U', 8 'MiG-21US' and 11 'MiG-21UM' were delivered between 1968 and 1985. 35 MiG-21s escaped to Iran during "Desert Storm" in 1991. Of those remaining in Iraq, none are operational, and most are likely destroyed or scrapped.

=== Israel ===
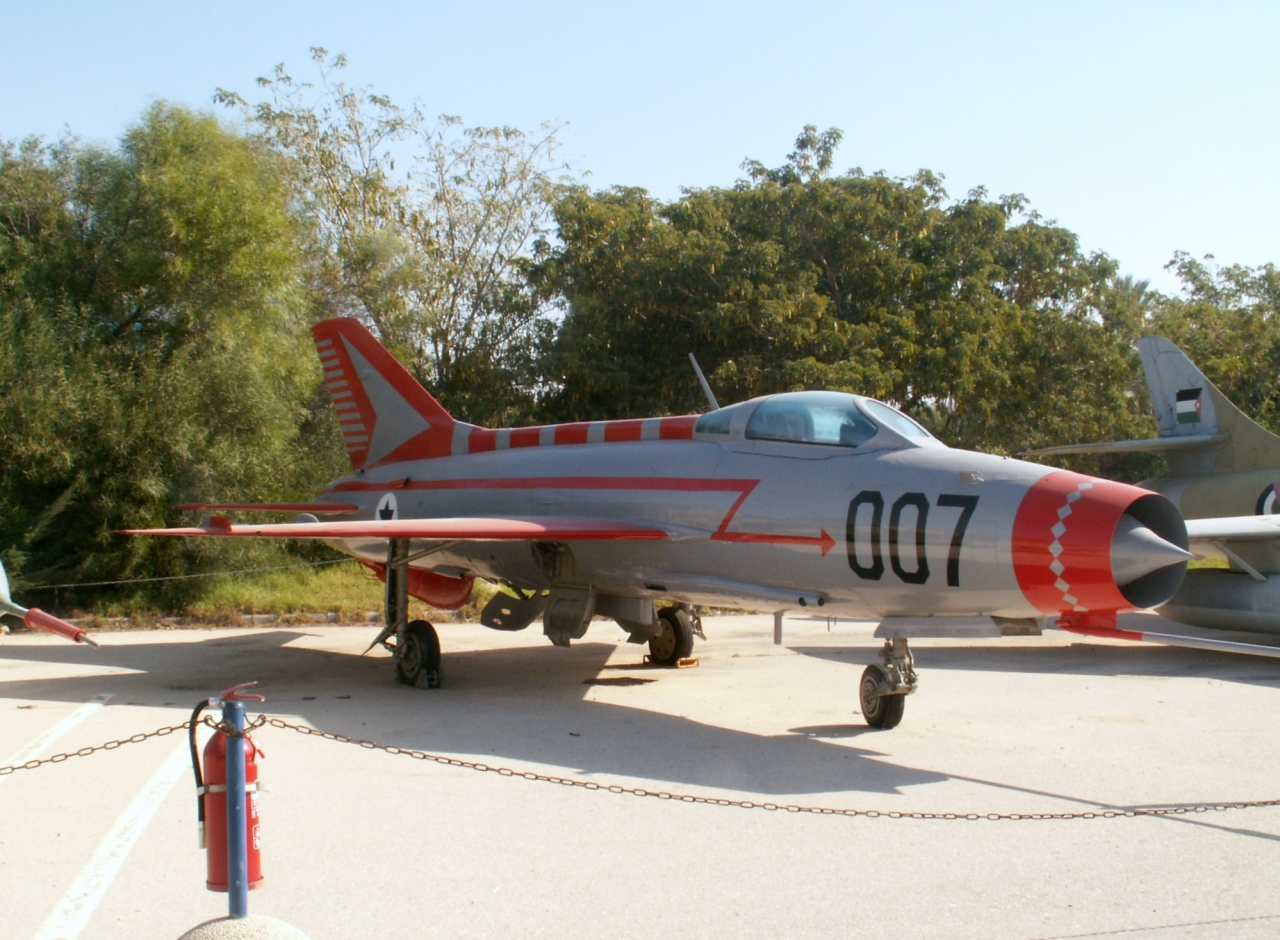
MiG-21F-13 at the Israeli Air Force Museum, Hatzerim airbase, Israel.

Israeli Defence Force/Air Force. A number of MiG-21s of various models have been captured in wars with neighbours, but the best-known example is the "007" aircraft, a 'MiG-21F-13' of the Iraqi pilot, Munir Redfa who defected to Israel in 1966. This aircraft was examined and then shipped to the USA. A second MiG-21F-13 was later given the same number; this aircraft is now on display in an Israeli camouflage scheme with Israeli markings at the IDF/AF museum at Hatzerim Airbase. Since the 1990s, Israel has also undertaken various MiG-21 modernisation programmes.

=== Kyrgyzstan ===
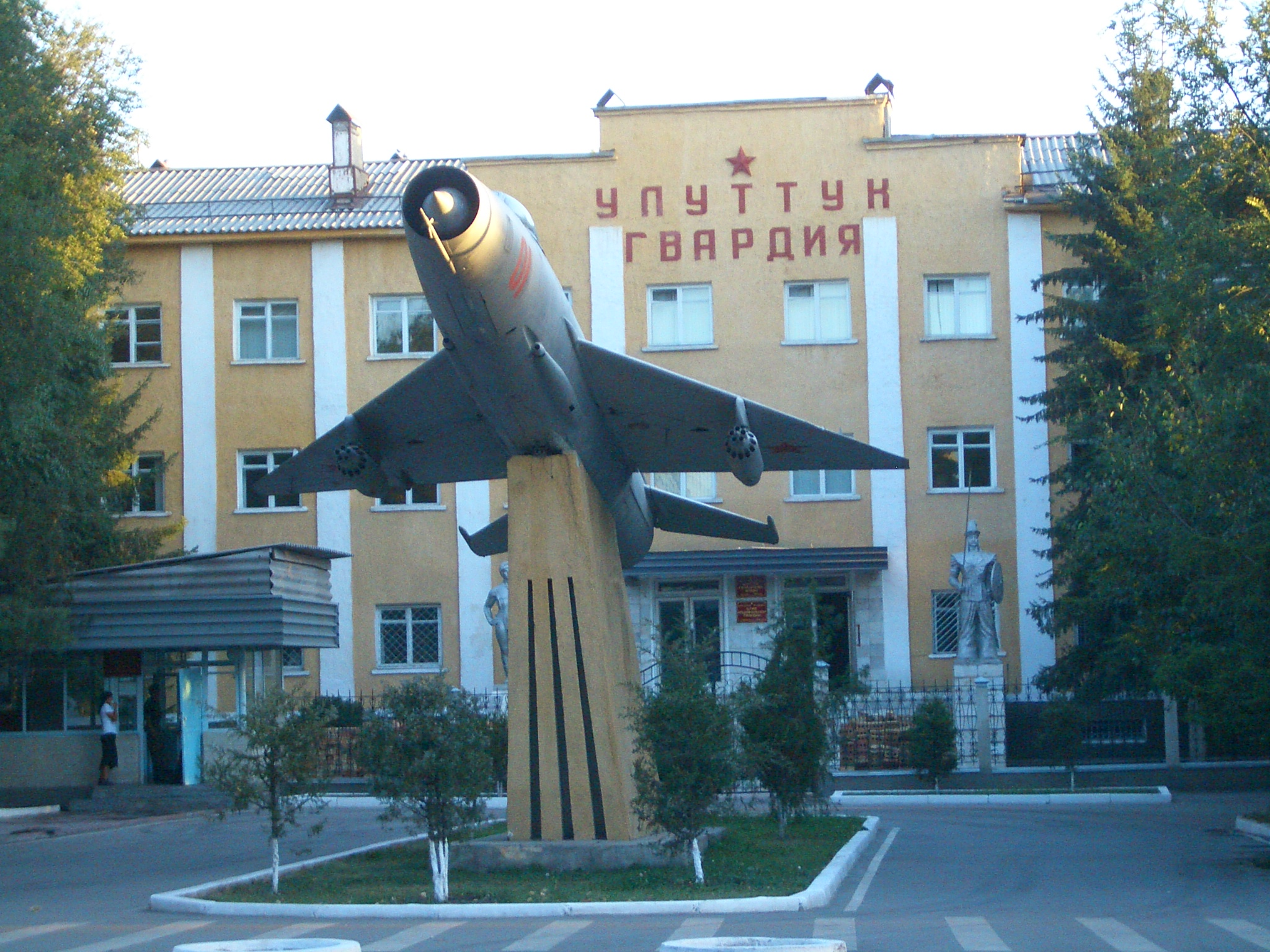
In downtown Bishkek. The sign says, "National Guard"

Air Force of Kyrgyzstan. A considerable number of MiG-21bis and MiG-21UM in storage near Bishkek. The Kyrgyz Air Force has no interest in operating them and has offered them for sale.

=== Laos ===
Lao People's Liberation Army Air Force. Thirteen MiG-21PFM and two MiG-21U were delivered in 1975, followed by ten MiG-21MF in 1985; none are now airworthy. There are reports of 20 MiG-21bis izdeliye 75A having been delivered in 1983, though there is now no trace of these, likely meaning they are also retired. A second batch of trainers, probably MiG-21UM, was also delivered.

=== Madagascar ===
Tafika Anabakabaka. There are some unconfirmed reports of MiG-21 deliveries prior to the proven delivery of at least 10 MiG-21bis and 2 MiG-21UM from the USSR. All MiG-21s were placed in storage by 2001.

=== Mongolia ===
Mongolian People's Air Force. Received 44 aircraft in 1977–1984. 8–12 MiG-21PFMs and two trainers – MiG-21UM – have reportedly been carefully been put into storage at air base Nalaikh due to lack of funds and shortage of spares, though there have been no reports of their reactivation to date.

=== Nigeria ===
Nigerian Air Force. 24 MiG-21MF and 6 MiG-21UM were delivered in 1975, with another MiG-21MF delivered at a later date as an attrition replacement. At least four were lost in accidents, and one is preserved as a gate guard at Makurdi Airport. A contract for 12 MiG-21bis and 2 MiG-21UM was signed in October 1984. Most of the Nigerian MiG-21s were put into storage in the 1990s due to lack of spares and cash. In the early 2000s, some offers were made for the overhaul of the remaining aircraft, in order to bring them back into service. However, Nigeria eventually chose to buy twelve new Chengdu F-7NI fighters and three FT-7NI trainers instead.

=== Poland ===
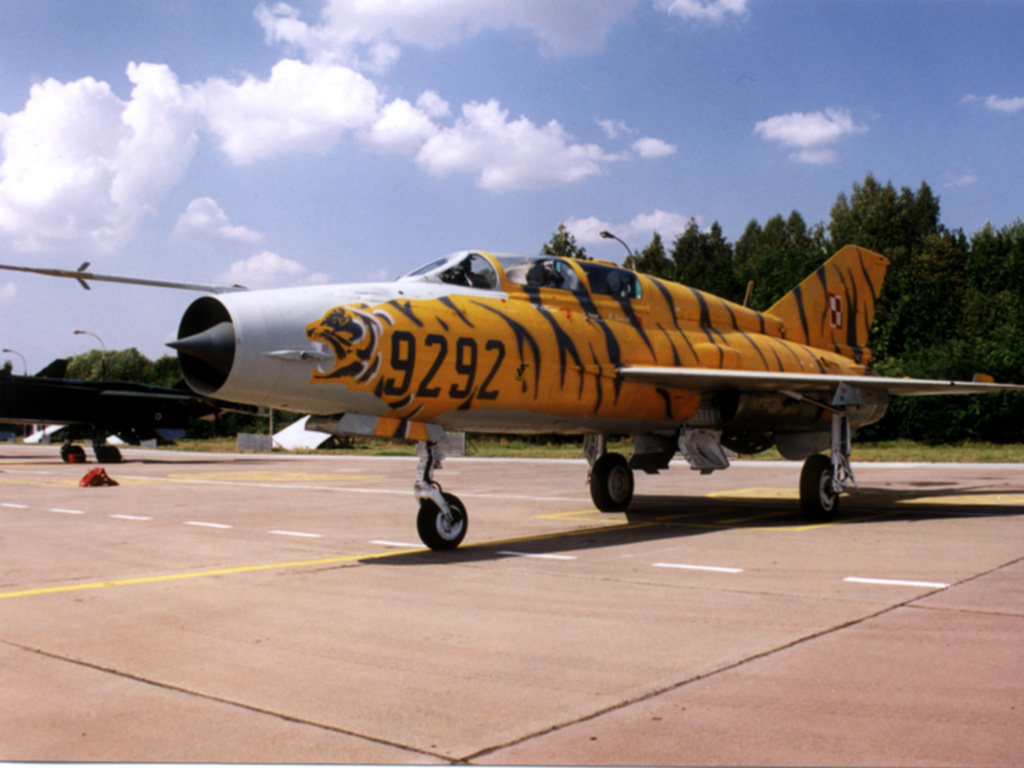
Two seater MiG-21UM, Polish Air Force, markings of 3rd Tactical Sqn.

Polish Air Force. Poland received its first 'MiG-21F-13' in June 1961. 24 more arrived in 1962–63, and all were withdrawn in 1971; twelve were sold to Syria in 1973. 84 'MiG-21PF' were delivered from 1964; the last ones were retired in December 1989. A total of 132 'MiG-21PFM' were delivered. Of these, twelve were the nuclear-capable izdeliye 94N and were designated 'MiG-21PFMN' by the Polish Air Force; the rest (izdeliye 94A) were designated 'MiG-21PFMA'. All were withdrawn by the mid-1990s; the PFMNs were retired in 1989 and stripped of their nuclear capability. Between 1968 and 1972 a total of 36 'MiG-21R's were delivered; the last of these were retired in 2002. 36 'MiG-21M's were delivered in 1969–70, with all retired by 2002. In total Poland received 120 'MiG-21MF's from 1972, with the last survivors retired in 2003. 72 'MiG-21bis' izdeliye 75A were delivered to Poland; the last of these were retired on December 31, 2003. The first trainers arrived in 1965 in the form of six 'MiG-21U' izdeliye 66-400; three were lost in accidents, and the other three were retired in 1990. Five MiG-21U izdeliye 66-600 were delivered in 1966 and were retired by 1990. Twelve 'MiG-21US' were delivered in 1969–70, the last being retired on December 31, 2003. Between 1971 and 1981 Poland received 54 'MiG-21UM's; all were likewise retired at the end of 2003. On July 15, 1970, a Polish MiG-21 flown by Henryk Osierda accidentally shot down a Su-7BKL of the Czechoslovak air force.

=== Romania ===
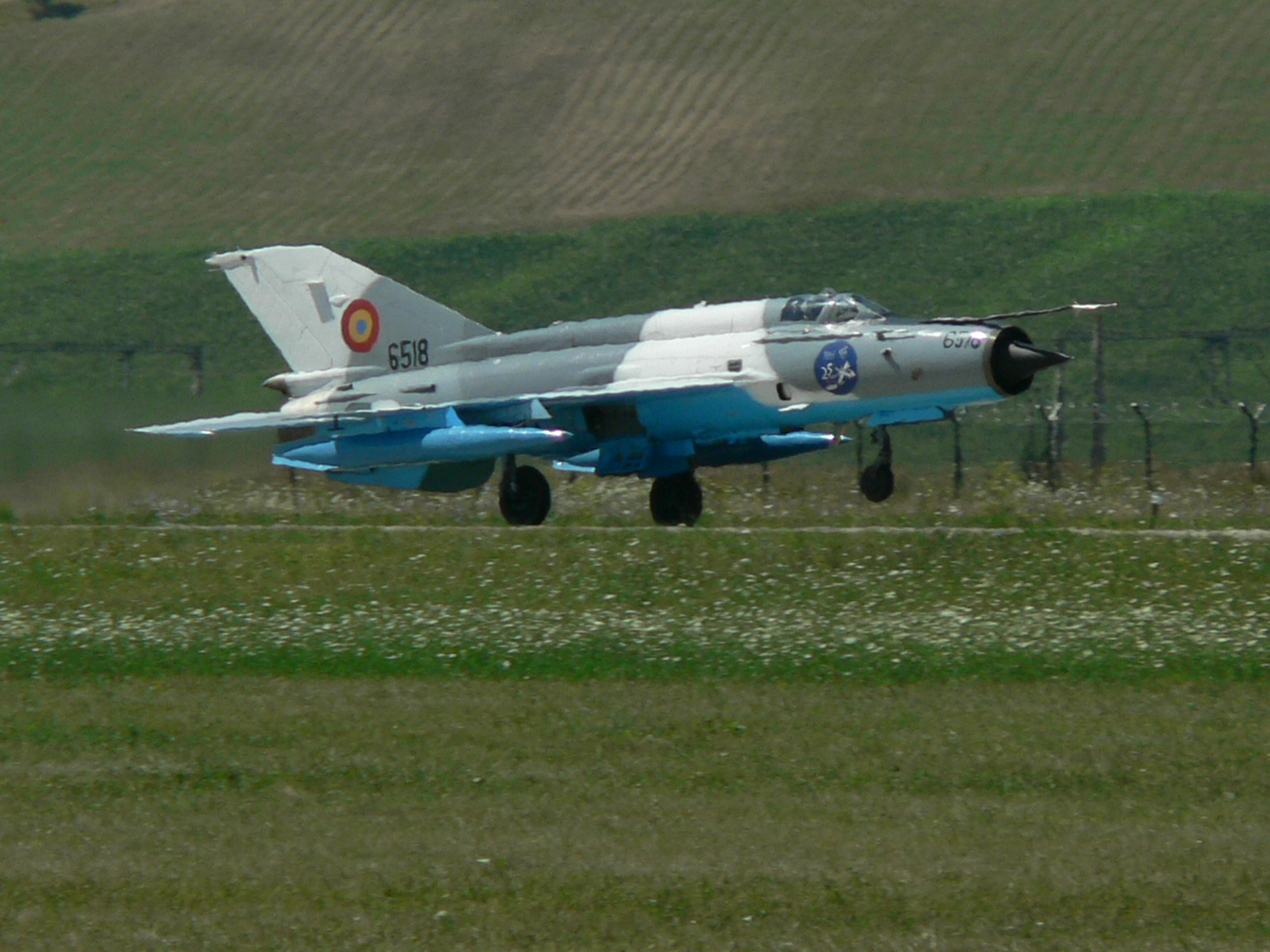
MiG-21 LanceR 'C' of RoAF 71st Air Base

Romanian Air Force. The first 12 out of 24 MiG-21F-13 were delivered on 13 February 1962. The remaining 12 MiG-21F-13 were delivered in 1962–63; they were withdrawn in 1976 but not officially written off until 1993. Deliveries of the MiG-21PF began in 1965, and a total of 38 were delivered; these were designated MiG-21RFM (Radar Fortaj Modernizat) in Romanian service. The survivors were grounded in the early 1990s and put into storage by 1999. The first MiG-21PFMs arrived in 1966. 29 of these were the standard izdeliye 94A, and 23 nuclear-capable variants (izdeliye 94N) were delivered as well. Both variants were designated MiG-21RFMM in Romanian service. The last of these were retired in 2002, replaced by MiG-21 Lancer As. Eleven MiG-21Rs, locally designated MiG-21C (Cercetare) were delivered in 1968, remaining in service until 1998. Starting in 1969, 60 MiG-21M were delivered, and a total of 71 MiG-21MFs were delivered starting in 1972. MiG-21Ms formed the basis for the MiG-21 Lancer A upgrade, and MiG-21MFs were rebuilt into MiG-21 Lancer Cs. A total of 73 Lancer A and 26 Lancer C were built, these were retired in May 2023. In Romanian service, all variants of the two-seat trainer were designated MiG-21DC (Dublă Comandă). The first four were MiG-21U izdeliye 66-400 arriving in 1965, followed by three of izdeliye 66-600. From 1969, fourteen MiG-21US were delivered, and 31 MiG-21UM were delivered between 1972 and 1980, of which 14 were upgraded to the MiG-21 Lancer B standard.

During the Romanian Revolution, Romanian MiG-21s were quite active, mostly responding to "shadows" caused by (probably Soviet) electronic warfare. The only known air-to-air action of the period involved a Romanian AF MiG-21MF shooting down an IAR 330 helicopter of the Romanian Army.

The Romanian Air Force began phasing out the MiG-21 in December 2016, replacing them with F-16 Fighting Falcons. Some LanceRs remain in service until 2023, restricted to air policing and training, after accidents caused a shutdown of its use. All MiG-21 aircraft were withdrawn from service in May 2023.

=== Serbia ===
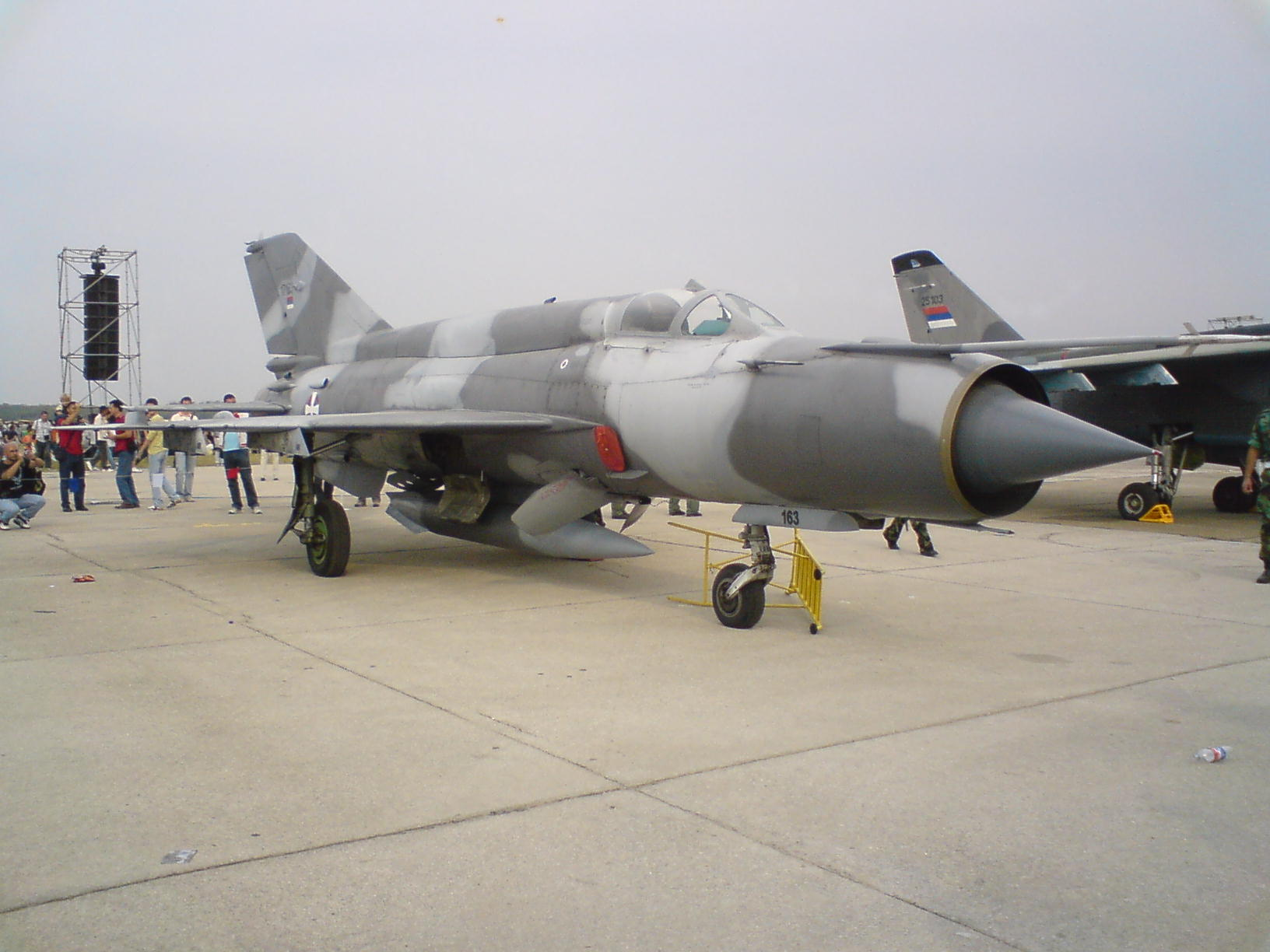
Serbian Air Force MiG-21

Serbian Air Force. Inherited from the Federal Republic of Yugoslavia in 2006. There were 31 MiG-21 aircraft, including: MiG-21bis, MiG-21UM and MiG-21M modified to carry reconnaissance pods. As of July 2016, only 3 MiG-21UM were operational. These have been armed with air to air missiles. All MiG-21bis have been grounded since September 2015. The MiG-21 was retired in 2020 following the crash of the last airworthy example on 25 September 2020.

=== Slovakia ===
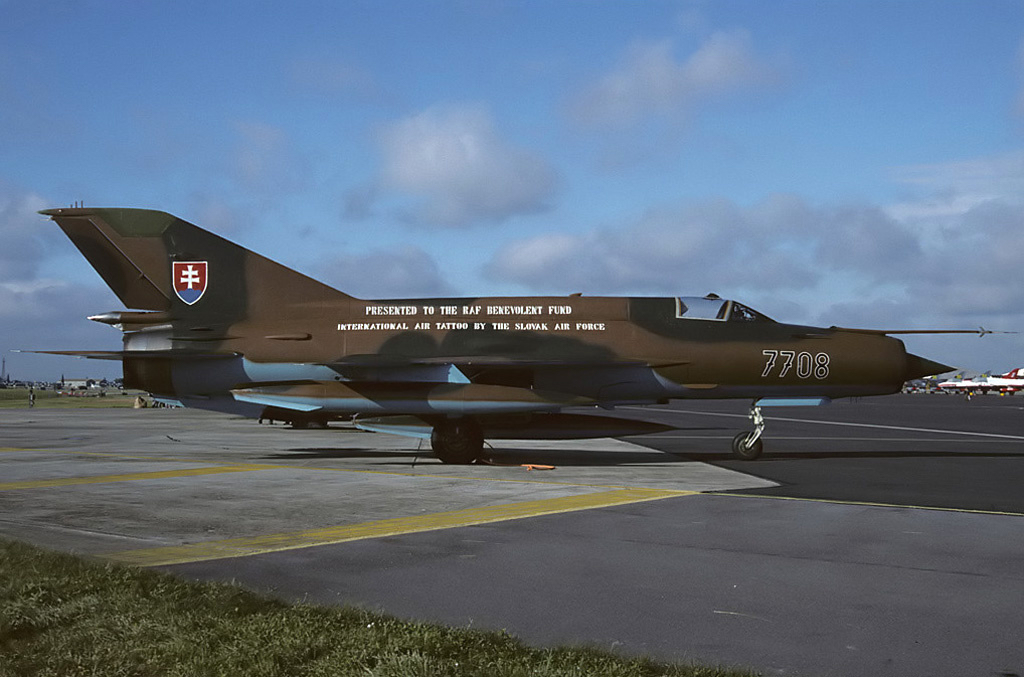
Retired Slovak Air Force MiG-21MF in 1994.

Slovak Air Force. The assets of the former Czechoslovak Air Force were divided following the separation of the country into Czechia and Slovakia. Of MiG-21 variants, Slovakia received 21 MiG-21F-13s (actually Czechoslovak-built S-106s), three MiG-21PFs, eleven MiG-21PFMs, eight MiG-21Rs, thirteen MiG-21MAs, 36 MiG-21MFs, three MiG-21U izdeliye 66-600s, two MiG-21US and 11 MiG-21UMs. The last few MiG-21MFs and UMs still in service were grounded on January 1, 2003.

=== Somalia ===
Somalia Aeronautical Corps. The SAC received 33 MiG-21MF fighters and 3 MiG-21US trainers starting in 1974. A lot of them were destroyed or damaged and subsequently abandoned in the Ogaden War and the subsequent civil wars. After the end of war in Ogaden Somali Air Force had nine still operational MiG-21s. However, no flying operations were undertaken after 1981. Currently, eight MiG-21 wrecks can still be seen at Mogadishu airport.

=== Soviet Union ===
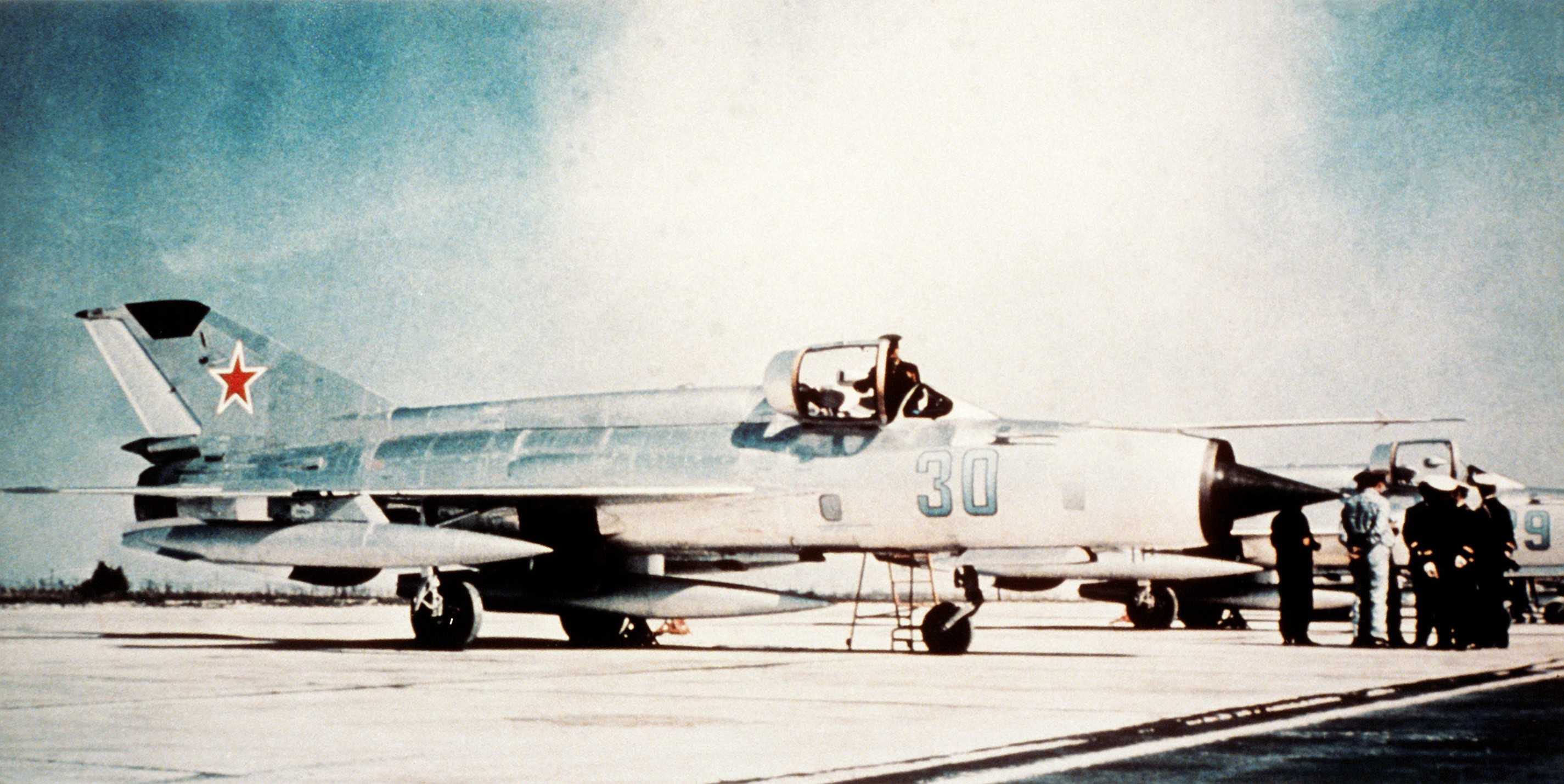
A Soviet MiG-21SM

Soviet Air Force and Soviet Anti-Air Defence. MiG-21 passed on to successor states.

=== Sudan ===
Sudanese Air Force: 4 in service as of 2023. 18 MiG-21M fighters were delivered from the USSR starting in 1969, together with some MiG-21US trainers. Up to 22 MiG-21Ms and 4 MiG-21US trainers were also delivered between 1974 and 1977. By 1992 there were only seven fighters and two trainers remaining, with perhaps half being serviceable; they were reported as all being out of service in 2008, although it is reported that 12 second-hand MiG-21s were to be delivered from Ukraine in 2007, and Flight International listed four MiG-21s as active in December 2022. The only air-to-air action known to have involved Sudanese MiG-21s occurred on September 20, 1972, when two MiG-21Ms forced several Libyan AF C-130Hs to land at Khartoum International Airport.

=== Syria ===
45 MiG-21F-13 were delivered around 1965 followed by 36 MiG-21PFs in 1966; six of the F-13s were lost in 1967 prior to the start of the Six-Day War, and during the war itself, 32 of 60 F-13s and PFs were destroyed. These losses were covered by future deliveries from the USSR, as well as four MiG-21F-13s from Czechoslovakia and 12 PFs (free of charge) from Hungary, Kecskemét AFB. From 1968, 100 MiG-21PFM and MiG-21PFS were delivered, as were six MiG-21Rs in the 1970s. Sixty-one MiG-21MFs were delivered between 1971 and 1973, but massive losses during the Yom Kippur War (180 Syrian fighters of all types were lost) resulted in the delivery of 75 more MFs from the USSR. During the Yom Kippur War, 12 MiG-21Ms were bought from East Germany and next 12 MiG-21F-13 from Poland. A total of 54 MiG-21s and MiG-23s are estimated to have been lost by Syria during the 1982 Lebanon War; and subsequently 198 MiG-21bis were supplied by the USSR through the 1980s. About eight MiG-21U trainers were delivered in the 1960s, and 20 MiG-21UMs around 1973. As of 2007, eight squadrons still operated MiG-21 aircraft, about 200 in total, namely 8 Sqn (MiG-21MF) at Deir ez-Zor, 12 Sqn (MiG-21MF) at Tabqa, 679 and 680 Sqns (all MiG-21MF) at Hama and 825, 826, 945 and 946 Sqns (all MiG-21bis) at Al Qusayr.

Syrian Arab Air Force had 51 in service as of 2023 and 50 in service as of 2024. The Syrian government of Al-Assad fell to rebels in late 2024, and the Syrian Arab Air Force was dismantled. It was re-established as Syrian Air Force, but the revolution, and the Israeli air strikes that followed it, wrecked havoc in the inventory of the Air Force. In late 2025, the World Air Forces publication by FlightGlobal, which tracks the aircraft inventories of world's air forces and publishes its counts annually, removed all Syrian Air Force's aircraft from their World Air Forces 2026 report. It is thus questionable if the Syrian Air Force has any flying aircraft in their inventory, and in particular, any MiG-21, as of December 2025.

=== Tanzania ===
Tanzanian Air Force. Fourteen MiG-21MFs and two MiG-21UMs were delivered from the USSR in 1974. In 1978–1979, they took part in the war against Uganda. A single captured Ugandan MiG-21MF was pressed into service with the Tanzanian Air Force towards the end of the war.

=== Uganda ===
Ugandan Air Force: 5 in service as of 2023. Up to 18 MiG-21MF fighters and three MiG-21U variants were delivered in the early 1970s. Seven were destroyed in the Israeli raid on Entebbe in 1976 and the rest were destroyed or captured by Tanzanian forces in 1979; the wreckage of many of these were still visible in Entebbe as late as 2003. In 1998, six MiG-21bis izdeliye 75A and one MiG-21UM were purchased from Poland. One of them crashed soon after delivery, on 15 July 1999, killing its pilot. Starting in October 1999, the MiG-21bis were overhauled and upgraded to a standard known as MiG-21-2000 by Israel Aerospace Industries. Another MiG-21bis crashed in July 2003, with its pilot killed. On 17 June 2006, a MiG-21UM crashed into Lake Victoria; this time, both pilots ejected safely. Lastly, in December 2008, a MiG-21bis crashed on take-off from Matari Airport in the Democratic Republic of the Congo, during operations against the Lord's Resistance Army. Its pilot was killed. An additional MiG-21UM was purchased from Georgia in the late 2000s. Moreover, at least one MiG-21bis was purchased from Ukraine around 2010. Five MiG-21s were recorded as in service as of December 2021.

Uganda retired its Mig-21 fleet between late 2023 and late 2024.

=== United States ===
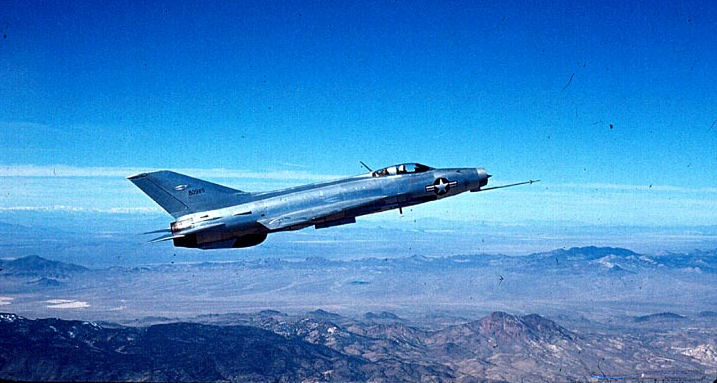
MiG-21 in USAF service.

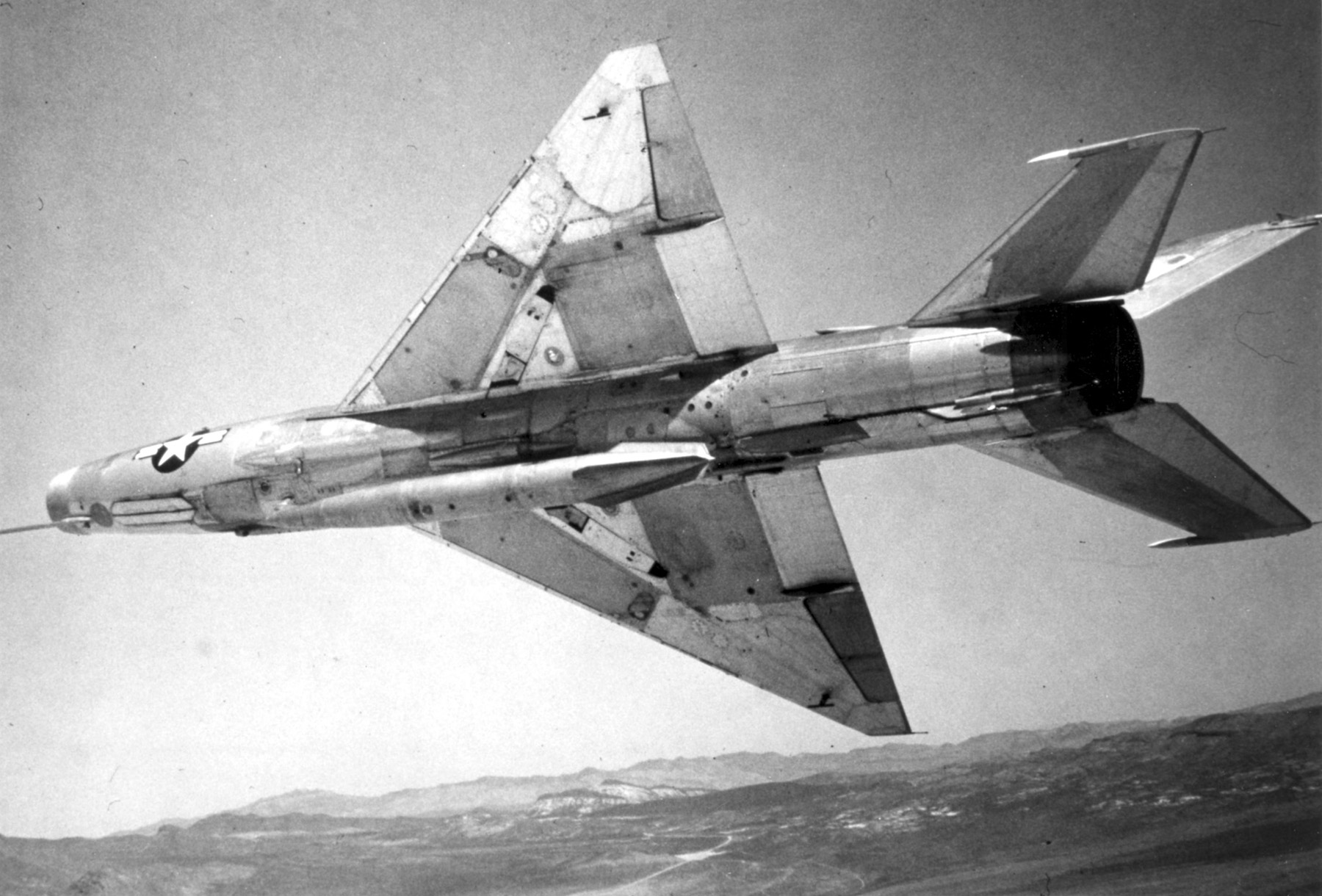
MiG-21 in USAF service

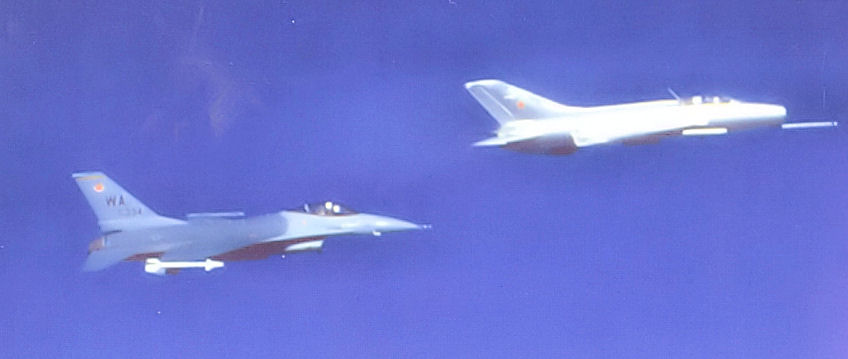
MiG-21 in USAF Fighter Weapons School service

United States Air Force. In the 1960s around a dozen MiG-21s were acquired by the U.S. Air Force from various sources. These include four out of six Algerian MiG-21F-13s that landed in error at an airbase in Egypt that had been captured by Israel during the Six-day war. The famous "007" MiG-21F-13 of an Iraqi defector to Israel was also handed over to the Americans; while, at least 13 MiG-21F-13s were sent from Indonesia to the US by President Suharto in the early 1970s. Many of these were not flown in the US, but were taken apart and examined in detail.

At least one MiG-21F-13 was flown by the US US Air Force in the 1960s. This MiG-21F-13 was given the USAF serial number 68-0965 and was intensively flight-tested in a programme codenamed HAVE DOUGHNUT that took place from January 23 to April 8, 1968. According to some reports, this MiG-21F-13 was the "007" handed over by the Israeli Air Force. It was tested together with a number of other aircraft, including an F-8 Crusader, an F-4B Phantom and a B-52. The final report concluded that the MiG-21F-13 was comparable to USAF types and though it was lacking in range and payload, it was "very manoeuvrable with an excellent rate of climb and acceleration", making it a good interceptor. Its "smokeless" engine was singled out for special praise. Later variants were almost certainly tested after 1969; this is lent weight by the crash of a MiG-23M on Nellis Range on April 26, 1984, in which the pilot, Lt Gen Robert M. Bond was killed, which suggests that the reports of an organisation called "Red Hat Squadron" have a basis in fact.

=== Ukraine ===
Ukrainian Air Force. None of the MiG-21s remaining in Ukraine after the breakup of the USSR were officially taken up by the UkrAF, but Ukraine had refurbished aircraft for sale in 2008.

=== Vietnam ===
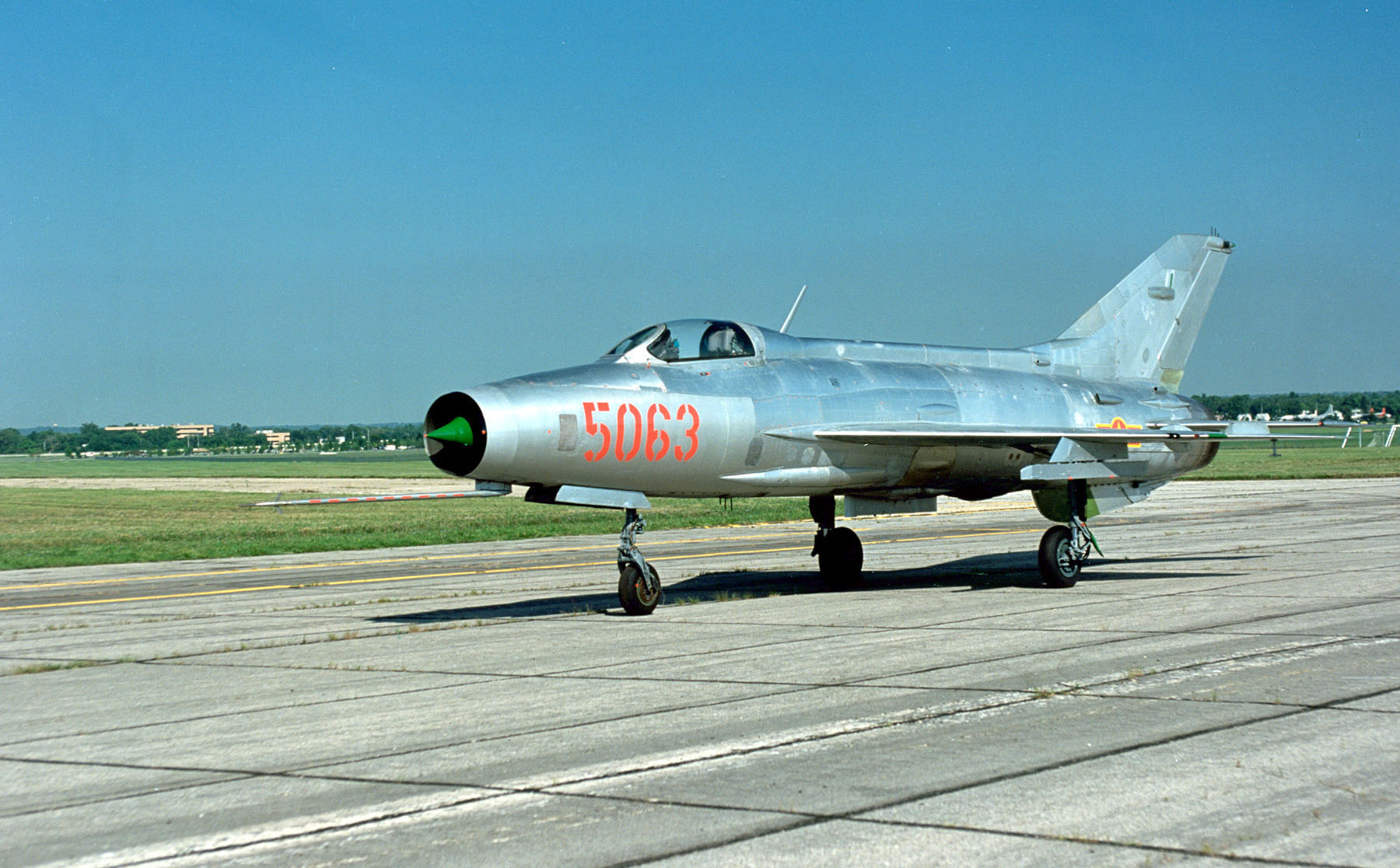
MiG-21F in Vietnam People's Air Force markings exhibited at the National Museum of the United States Air Force.

Vietnam People's Air Force. The VPAF received the first of its 20 or 30 'MiG-21F-13' fighters in 1965; 30 'MiG-21PFLs, a special variant for Vietnam, were delivered in 1966 (some historians refer to this variant as 'MiG-21PFV' (V = Vietnam), but this is denied by the MiG OKB); either 100 or 110 'MiG-21PFM' were delivered starting in 1968; sixty 'MiG-21MF' were delivered around 1970; several batches of 'MiG-21bis' izdeliye 75B were delivered starting in 1979, and 18 of izdeliye 75A were received second hand from Poland in 2005 (the 18 included a few 'MiG-21UMs). In 1998 Vietnam was interested in buying 120 exploited Polish MiG-21M, MiG-21MF, MiG-21UM and MiG-21US, but it is not known if they were purchased. An unknown number of all variants of the MiG-21 trainers were delivered, but 'MiG-21UMs were the majority. In 1996, six UMs arrived from Ukraine.

The order of battle of units operating MiG-21s in 2007:

- 370th Air Division
  - 929th Fighter Regiment (Da Nang)
  - 935th Fighter Regiment (Biên Hòa)
- 371st Air Division
  - 921st Fighter Regiment (Noi Bai)
  - 927th Fighter Regiment (Kép)
  - 931st Fighter Regiment (Yên Bái)
- 372nd Air Division
  - 933rd Fighter Regiment (Kiến An)
- Air Academy
  - 920th Fighter Regiment (Phù Cát)
  - 932nd Fighter Regiment (Phù Cát)

=== Yemen ===
Yemeni Air Force: 19 in service as of 2023. The service inherited MiG-21s from the air forces of both North and South Yemen following the 1994 civil war. 24 MiG-21bis and 4 MiG-21UM were later overhauled in Odesa; however, Yemen failed to pay for eight of them, and they were never returned. 19 MiG-21s were reported operational as of 2023.

=== North Yemen ===
Yemen Arab Republic Air Force. In November 1979, North Yemeni president Ali Abdullah Saleh concluded an arms deal with the USSR, including 60 MiG-21bis and MiG-21UM. All of the surviving MiG-21s were transferred to the new Yemen Air Force following unification of the two Yemens in 1990.

=== South Yemen ===
People's Democratic Republic of Yemen Air Force. More than 40 MiG-21MF were delivered to South Yemen in 1973–1974. In the 1980s, some MiG-21bis also entered service with the South Yemeni Air Force. Some MiG-21UM trainers were delivered as well. All of the surviving MiG-21s were transferred to the new Yemen Air Force following the unification of the two Yemens in 1990.

=== Yugoslavia ===
==== SFR Yugoslavia ====
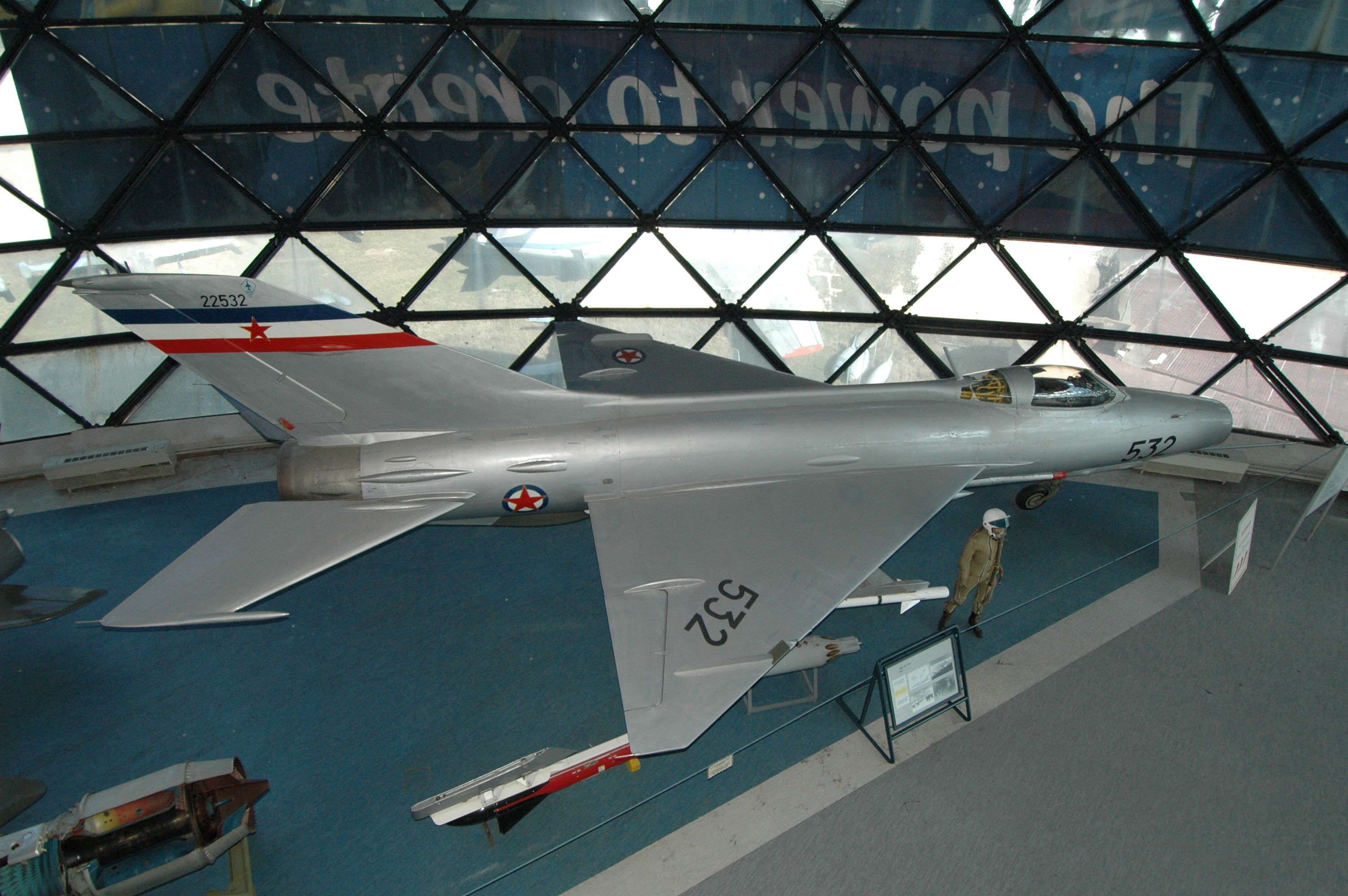
Yugoslav Air Force MiG-21F-13 s/n 22532 on display at the Museum of Aviation in Belgrade.

The Socialist Federal Republic of Yugoslavia operated up to 261 MiG-21s in 10 variants from 1962 till 1992. There were 41 MiG-21F-13, 36 MiG-21PFM, 25 MiG-21M, 6 MiG-21MF, 46 MiG-21bis, 45 MiG-21bisK, 12 MiG-21R, 18 MiG-21U, 25 MiG-21UM and 7 MiG-21US. During the war in western Yugoslavia, these aircraft were passed on to the newly established air force of the Federal Republic of Yugoslavia. Yugoslavia eventually acquired 41 MiG-21F-13s, 36 MiG-21PFMs, 12 MiG-21Rs, 25 MiG-21Ms, 2 MiG-21MFs, and imported MFs. 4 L-15i, 91 MiG-21bis, 9 MiG-21U-400, 9 MiG-21U-600, 7 MiG-21US, 25 MiG-21UM.

Yugoslav MiG-21s were used briefly in the first period of the Yugoslav wars in Croatia and Bosnia and Herzegovina between 1991 and 1992, mostly in ground attack missions. Additionally there are four known incidents of MiG-21s forcing Croatian police helicopters or civilian airliners to land, several aerial victories are credited to MiG-21s of the Yugoslav Air Force. On January 7, 1992, an AB-205 helicopter of the European Community was downed by a MiG-21bis of the 124th Fighter Aviation Squadron.

Yugoslav Air Force squadrons operating MiG-21 aircraft:

- 123rd Fighter Aviation Squadron
- 124th Fighter Aviation Squadron
- 125th Fighter Aviation Squadron
- 126th Fighter Aviation Squadron
- 127th Fighter Aviation Squadron
- 128th Fighter Aviation Squadron
- 129th Fighter Aviation Squadron
- 130th Fighter Aviation Squadron
- 352nd Reconnaissance Aviation Squadron
- 353rd Reconnaissance Aviation Squadron

==== FR Yugoslavia ====
The Air Force of the Federal Republic of Yugoslavia inherited its MiG-21s from the former Socialist Yugoslav Air Force. Some were damaged during the 1999 NATO war against Yugoslavia; survivors were passed on to Serbia. Very little MiG-21 activity is known of from the time of the NATO bombardment, though a MiG-21 is credited with the downing of a BGM-109 Tomahawk cruise missile on March 24, 1999. Further, Serbian and other sources claim that Yugoslav MiG-21s destroyed three Albanian J-7s, but none of these is believed to be a valid claim, as only 10 were in service at that time and none of them was flight capable.

- 204th Fighter Aviation Regiment
  - 126th Fighter Aviation Regiment
  - 352nd Reconnaissance Aviation Squadron
- 83rd Fighter Aviation Regiment
  - 123rd Fighter Aviation Regiment
  - 124th Fighter Aviation Regiment
  - 130th Fighter Aviation Regiment

=== Zambia ===
Zambian Air Force & Air Defence Command. The ZAFADC received at least 16 MiG-21bis fighters and two MiG-21UM trainers, starting in 1980. In 1997, 12 or 13 of them were sent to Israel, to be overhauled by Israel Aerospace Industries. However, due to a lack of finances, at least three of them were never returned to Zambia. The entire ZAFADC MiG-21 fleet was withdrawn in early 2009.

== Civil operators ==
Some aircraft are now owned and flown by private collectors as warbirds. There are even importers in the U.S. that purchase MiG-21s, MiG-15s and MiG-17s from Russia and other states and sell them to civilians for around $450,000.
