= Sirsa Air Force Station =

Sirsa Air Force Station Sirsa Vayu Sena Chhawni
- IATA: none; ICAO: VISX; GPS: VISX

Summary
- Airport type: Military
- Owner: Indian Air Force
- Operator: Western Air Command
- Location: Sirsa, Haryana
- Occupants: No. 21 Squadron IAF; No. 15 Squadron IAF
- Time zone: IST (UTC+05:30)
- Elevation AMSL: 198 m (650 ft)
- Coordinates: 29°33′42″N 75°00′21″E

Map
- Location of the airport in Haryana VISX (India)

Runways
Direction	Length		Surface
Direction	m	ft	Surface
05/23	2,730	8,956	Concrete / asphalt

Sirsa Air Force Station or Sirsa AFS (ICAO: VISX) is an Indian Air Force base under Western Air Command, located at Sirsa in the state of Haryana, India.

== History ==
In Indo-Pakistani War of 1971, Pakistan Air Force launched a pre-emptive raid on 12 airforce stations, including Sirsa station, Faridkot Stations, Halwara Air Force Station, a few railway stations, Indian armour concentrations and other targets. However, this failed to cause any significant damage except pothole damage to the runway which was quickly repaired. Dassault Mystère IV jets from Sirsa base pounded the Pakistan Army pitched against the Indian Army in the Battle of Sabuna Drain. Dassault Mystère also hit a train and destroyed 50 tanks on it between Okara and Sahiwal.

During the 2025 India-Pakistan conflict, the Pakistan Armed Forces claimed that they had targeted Sirsa airfield. Debris of a Pakistani Fatah-II missile that was intercepted over Sirsa were found near the airfield, and Indian officials have stated that no damage occurred at the base. The missile is reportedly a Fatah-II ballistic missile that was blown up in the air.

== Units ==
It has No. 21 Squadron IAF of 45 Wing. Wing is an active air force combat formation. No. 15 Squadron IAF operating Su-30MKI is also based here.

Originally the base was home to a squadron each of MiG-23s single-engine fighters and MiG-27s single-engine ground-attack aircraft, of No. 21 Squadron IAF.

== See also ==
- Airports Authority of India
- Ambala Air Force Station
- Gurugram Air Force Station
- Hisar Military Station
- List of Armed Forces Hospitals In India
- List of highways in Haryana
- List of Indian Air Force bases
- Railway in Haryana
- Raja Nahar Singh Faridabad Air Force Logistics Station
