= No. 15 Squadron IAF =

No. 15 Squadron Flying Lancers
- Insignia of The No. 15 Squadron IAF "Flying Lancers"
- Active: 2 August 1951 — February 1953; 26 November 1964 — July 2009; 2012 — Present
- Country: Republic of India
- Branch: Indian Air Force
- Role: CAS; Interdiction; Reconnaissance
- Garrison/HQ: Sirsa AFS
- Nickname: "Flying Lancers"
- Mottos: निहन्तव्याः शत्रवः Annihilate the Enemy

Aircraft flown
- Attack: Sukhoi Su-30MKI

No. 15 Squadron IAF nicknamed as Flying Lancers is a fighter squadron of the Indian Air Force. It was formed on 20 August 1951, and currently operates the Sukhoi Su-30MKI from Sirsa AFS.

No. 15 Squadron was raised in 1951 at Ambala as part of an emergency wartime expansion. Initially operating with just a handful of Spitfire XVIII taken out from a training role, it was among the four "teen squadrons" set up to bolster the IAF’s strength in anticipation of conflict.

The squadron participated in 2025 India-Pakistan Conflict striking airbases and terror targets.The squadron received 3 Vir Chakra for the conflict.

== Assignments ==
- Indo-Pakistani War of 1965
- Indo-Pakistani War of 1971
- 2025 India-Pakistan Conflict

== Aircraft ==
Aircraft types operated by the squadron

Aircraft type	From	To	Air base
Supermarine Spitfire VIII	2 August 1951	February 1953	AFS Ambala
Folland Gnat I	26 November 1964	1969	AFS Ambala
Folland Gnat I	1969	February 1975	AFS Bagdogra
MiG-21 bis	February 1975	1981	AFS Pune
MiG-21 bis	1981	July 2009	AFS Bhuj
Su-30 MKI	2012	Present	AFS Sirsa
