= No. 21 Squadron IAF =

Unit of the Indian Air Force

No. 21 Squadron
- Crest of No. 21 Squadron
- Active: 16 October 1965 – N/A
- Country: India
- Role: Air Defence; Ground attack
- Garrison/HQ: AFS Sirsa
- Nickname: "Ankush"
- Mottos: Siddhirvasti Sahase; Success lies in courage

Aircraft flown
- Fighter: MiG-21 bis

No. 21 Squadron IAF (Ankush), is an Air Defence and Ground Attack unit of the Indian Air Force, operating from Sirsa AFS, as part of 12 Wing of Western Air Command. The squadron was number plated on an unspecified date.

== History ==
The Squadron was formed on 16 October 1965, as an Air Defence unit, under Wing Commander E.R. Fernandes. It was to be equipped with Folland Gnats, but relied on Gnats borrowed from 2 Squadron, and 18 Squadron, until 14 May 1966, when it got its first batch of Gnats. In December 1968, the squadron was also allotted the role of Ground-Attack.

=== 1971 Operations ===
==== Task ====
During the Indo-Pakistan War of 1971, the task of Air Defence of the Barmer Sector was allotted to the squadron, for which the squadron operated from Uttarlai with eight Gnats, with three more Gnats and pilots at Amritsar. The squadron was commanded by Wing Commander S.S. Malik, who was also designated Air Defence Commander of the sector. The Station Commander at Uttarlai was Wing Commander V.K. Murthy.

The men of the squadron were initially housed in tents. Subsequently, they were housed in the underground ATC. As word spread that Pakistani Commandos were seen in the sand, the men had to take turns doing night patrols. Soldiers could only have a bath every alternate day, and had six hundred rounds of ammunition with which they had to hunt goose for food.

==== Operations ====
On 3 December, a Pakistani Canberra, dropped eight bombs on the runway, making it unsuitable for use. However using civilian labour, the squadron cleared out the parallel taxi track. Thereafter only the track was used for take-off and landing. During the war, the squadron flew a total of 109 sorties, most of which were Combat Air patrols.

The first bit of action it saw was on the morning of 10 December. Squadron Leader Kale, and Flying Officer P. Ajit were flying a CAP, when they spotted two F-104 Starfighters. they engaged the planes, but failed to do damage, and had their runway bombed. A little later, the base was given a P-12 Radar, causing the Pakistani Air Force to avoid Uttarlai.

On 13 December six of their aircraft were moved to Ahmedabad to defend Ankleshwar Oil Refinery, and later four of these aircraft were to be moved to Srinagar. However they were informed of the ceasefire when they reached Pathankot, and flew back to Gorkhapur.

=== Post-War Era ===
The squadron won a number of trophies in gunnery meets, and was visited by the then Air Chief Marshal Arjan Singh, and Air Vice Marshal H. Mulgavkar.

In 1975, the squadron moved to Bakshi ka Talab, and operated there till 1 December 1976, when it was relocated to AFS Pune, and re-equipped with MiG 21 BIS. During this time three officers were awarded the Vayu Sena Medal.

The squadron was tasked with helping other squadrons with the conversion to MiG 21 BIS, Within the first year, 46 pilots had been converted. On 24 September 1977, Air Chief Marshal Mulgavkar visited the squadron. In June 1978, the first accident with a MiG 21 in the IAF took place. The nose of an aircraft sheared off on landing during a night sortie.

By June 1979, they had converted 11 more pilots. On 18 October, Wing Commander S.A.B. Naidu took over command of the squadron from Wing Commander D.N. Rathore (VrC, VM). Naidu was awarded Central Air Command Commendation on 26 January 1980. During this period the squadron took part in several exercises, Exercise Ranbheru, Exercise Agnivarsha, and the CAC Weapons Meet, alongside 4 Forward Base Support Unit, Exercise Ajinkya at 5 Wing, and Exercise Hamla conducted by South Western Air Command. In February 1980, the Squadron won the team event and R/P event for CAC.

From 1981 to 1982, the squadron strived to achieve higher standards, and participated in several air-to-air missile and gun-firing exercises, such as Exercise Vajraghat-III, Exercise Chaukanna-III and IV. By 19 May 1982, the squadron had achieved 100% serviceability, and all the aircraft were flown that day.

The squadron was number plated on an unspecified date. Currently, only 4 MiG-21 Bison squadron remains in service.

== Aircraft ==
Aircraft types operated by the squadron

Aircraft type	From	To	Air base
Folland Gnat I	16 October 1965	1966	AFS Halwara
Folland Gnat I	1966	1971	AFS Gokrahpur
Folland Gnat I	1971	January 1977	AFS Lucknow
Mig-21 bis	January 1977	1987	AFS Pune
Mig-21 bis	1 January 1987	N/A	AFS Sirsa
