= 2025 India–Pakistan conflict =

Armed conflict in South Asia

- Part of Indo-Pakistani wars and conflicts, 2025 India–Pakistan crisis, Insurgency in Jammu and Kashmir and Kashmir conflict
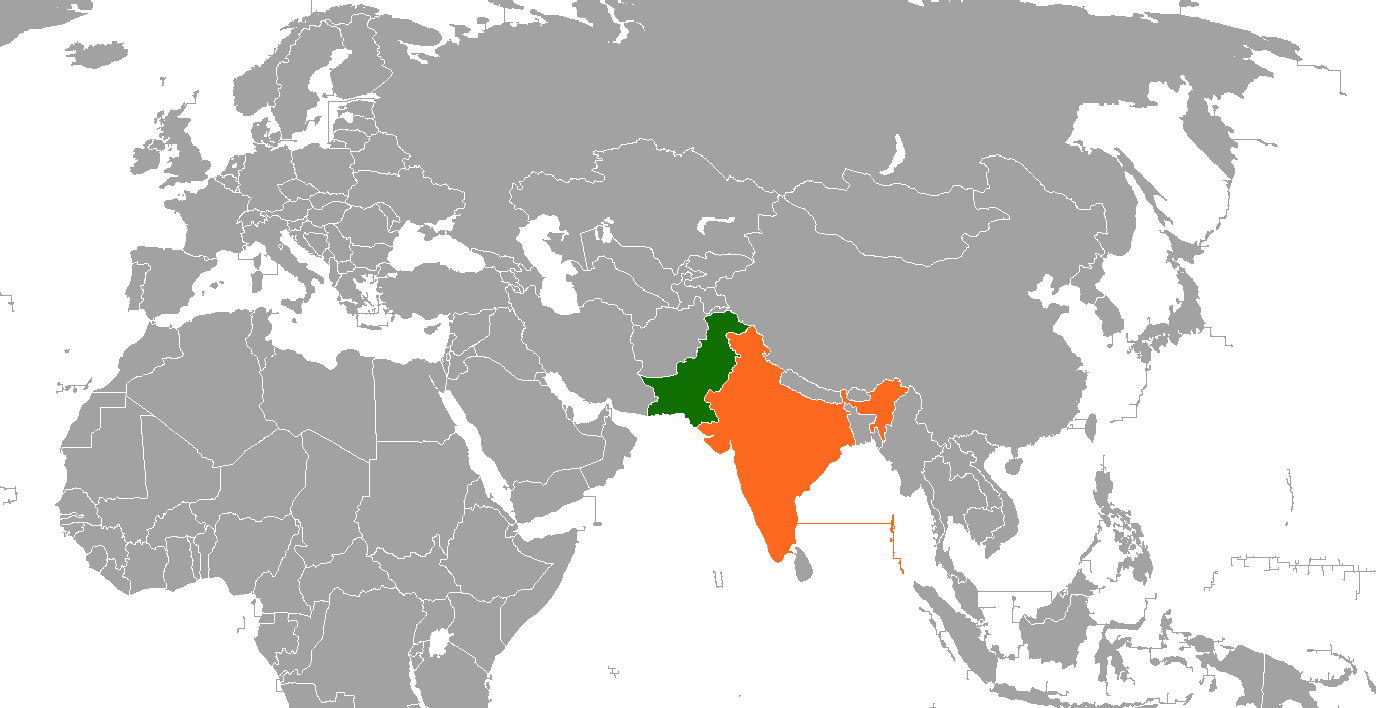
- Location of India (orange) and Pakistan (green)
Date	7–10 May 2025 (4 days)
Location	India; Pakistan
Result	Ceasefire

Belligerents
India	Pakistan

Commanders and leaders
Narendra Modi; Anil Chauhan; Amar Preet Singh	Shehbaz Sharif; Asim Munir; Zaheer Ahmed Babar

Casualties and losses
- See casualties

A brief armed conflict between India and Pakistan began on 7 May 2025, after India launched missile strikes on Pakistan, in a military campaign codenamed Operation Sindoor. (Note: Sindoor is a reddish pigment used by Hindu women on their foreheads to indicate their married status. This was due to Hindu men being selectively targeted in the earlier Pahalgam attack, leaving their wives widowed.) India said that the operation was in response to the Pahalgam attack in Indian-administered Jammu and Kashmir on 22 April 2025 in which 26 civilians were killed. India accused Pakistan of supporting cross-border terrorism, which Pakistan denied.

On 7 May, India launched Operation Sindoor with missile strikes on terrorism-related infrastructure facilities of Pakistan-based militant groups Jaish-e-Mohammed and Lashkar-e-Taiba in Pakistan and Pakistan-administered Azad Kashmir, and said that no Pakistani military or civilian facilities were targeted. According to Pakistan, the Indian strikes hit civilian areas, including mosques and residential areas, and resulted in civilian casualties. Following these strikes, there were border skirmishes and drone strikes between the two countries. Pakistan's army retaliated on 7 May, by launching a blitz of mortar shells on Jammu, particularly Poonch, which killed civilians, and damaged homes and religious sites. This conflict marked the first drone battle between the two nuclear-armed nations.

In the early hours of 10 May, India accused Pakistan of launching missile attacks on Indian air bases including the Sirsa air base while Pakistan accused India of launching attacks on several Pakistan air bases, including Nur Khan air base, Rafiqi air base, and Murid air base. As conflict escalated on 10 May, Pakistan launched its Operation Bunyan-un-Marsoos, (Note: Bunyan-un-Marsoos is an Arabic term meaning "Unbreakable Wall". The operation's name is derived from a verse in the Quran, etched in the mihrab of the attacked mosque in Muzaffarabad. It states: "Surely Allah loves those who fight in His cause in ˹solid˺ ranks as if they were one concrete structure."- Quran 61:4 The entire 2025 India–Pakistan crisis was termed "Marka-i-Haq" ("The Battle of Truth") by the Pakistan military.) in which it said it had targeted several Indian military bases, including Udhampur air base, Pathankot air base and Adampur air base.

After the four-day military conflict, both India and Pakistan announced that a ceasefire had been agreed after a hotline communication between their DGMOs (Directors General of Military Operations) on 10 May 2025. US vice president JD Vance and Secretary of State Marco Rubio held extensive correspondence with both Indian and Pakistani officials during the negotiations. The ceasefire has been holding, with resumed commercial flights and normalcy reported from both countries. Flight restrictions by both countries on each others aircraft has continued for over a year.

== Background ==
The Kashmir conflict, ongoing since 1947, has fuelled multiple wars and skirmishes between India and Pakistan over the disputed region.

On 22 April 2025, a terrorist attack by five armed terrorists near Pahalgam in Indian-administered Jammu and Kashmir killed 26 civilians, mostly Hindu tourists. The Resistance Front, a militant faction of the Pakistan-based, UN-designated terrorist group Lashkar-e-Taiba, operating in Indian-administered Kashmir, initially claimed responsibility for the attack, but later denied responsibility, saying that the earlier claim was the result of a coordinated hacking, and attributed the breach to Indian authorities. Pakistan alleged that the Pahalgam attack was a "false flag operation" orchestrated by India.

India announced a series of retaliatory measures against Pakistan, including the suspension of the Indus Waters Treaty, prompting responsive measures and leading to a diplomatic crisis and border skirmishes. According to military aviation magazine AirForces Monthly, on 29 April, four Indian Air Force (IAF) Rafale aircraft departed from Ambala Air Force Station on a mission to bomb terrorist targets in the north but aborted and diverted to Srinagar Air Force Station due to an electronic warfare jamming claimed by PAF. As described by the magazine, following this failed attack, and before 6 May, the IAF redeployed up to 20 Rafale aircraft from Hasimara Air Force Station (home of No. 101 Squadron IAF in the Eastern Command) to Gwalior, Ambala, Srinagar, and Nal Air Force Station in Rajasthan. Several S-400 missile system surface-to-air missile batteries were also repositioned to Adampur, Bhuj, and Bikaner. During late April and early May, the IAF mobilised around 400 aircraft, with its transport fleet conducting more than 500 sorties. On 30 April, Pakistan said that a military strike by India was imminent.

In response to India's actions, Pakistan closed its airspace to all Indian carriers (eg. Air India, Indigo, etc.) and suspended trade, considering their suspension of the Indus water treaty as an "act of war".

== Timeline ==
=== 7 May ===
India announced that it had launched missile and air strikes, codenamed Operation Sindoor, targeting nine sites across Pakistani-administered Azad Kashmir and Pakistan's Punjab province. Indian military spokespeople said that the missile strikes targeted infrastructure linked to the terrorist groups Lashkar-e-Taiba (LeT), Jaish-e-Mohammed (JeM) and Hizbul Mujahideen (HuM), and that no Pakistani military facilities were targeted, with the locations selected to avoid damage to civilian infrastructure. The Indian government described the strikes as "focused, measured, and non-escalatory".

The Indian air strikes triggered an aerial battle in which more than 114 aircraft, 72 from the IAF and 42 from the PAF, were involved in what was described as the largest beyond visual range engagement on the India–Pakistan border. Neither Pakistani nor Indian aircraft crossed the border, engaging instead in a "stand-off" conflict at a distance of more than 100 km at times. According to a senior PAF officer, the engagement lasted approximately 52 minutes. Pakistan claimed that three Dassault Rafales, one MiG-29, one Su-30MKI fighter jet, and one Israeli-manufactured IAI Heron UAV belonging to the Indian Air Force were shot down.

The Pakistani government condemned the Indian strikes as an "act of war" that resulted in civilian casualties. Shehbaz Sharif convened a meeting of the National Security Council to coordinate retaliatory strikes. The NSC declared that Pakistan "reserves the right to respond, in self-defence, at a time, place, and manner of its choosing." Sharif gave the Pakistani army, under Asim Munir, the right to respond in any way needed. On 7 May 2025, Pakistan closed its airspace to all air carriers including its own Pakistan International Airlines. Many international carriers like British Airways and Air France had their flights to and from South Asia and Australia planned to avoid Pakistani airspace. Pakistan re-opened their airspace to non-Indian air carriers on 8 May, the day after it had been closed.

According to India, Pakistani cross-border artillery shelling and small arms firing increased following the Indian attacks, including in the regions of Poonch, Rajouri, Kupwara, Baramulla, Uri and Akhnoor, located in Indian-administered Jammu and Kashmir. Pakistani shelling of Poonch town and its vicinity killed at least 11 people and damaged an Islamic school along with numerous homes. According to The News Minute, the casualties included a Sikh ragi. Pakistan said that the Neelum–Jhelum Hydropower Plant had been damaged by Indian shelling following the initial Indian strikes.

=== 8 May ===
On 8 May, India said that Pakistan had launched drone and missile strikes on several Indian cities, including Amritsar, and that India negated these strikes by the S-400 missile system at Adampur Air Force Station, marking India's first combat use of the missile system. Pakistan denied launching drone and missile strikes on India. Pakistani Foreign Minister Ishaq Dar claimed that the Indian Army had intentionally carried out a false flag attack on the Indian city of Amritsar, blaming it on Pakistan in order to generate domestic support. The Pakistani military spokesperson also claimed that Indian drones headed towards Nankana Sahib were brought down. The claim was denied by India and described as false by Indian media. Indian foreign secretary Vikram Misri dismissed these as a "deranged fantasy" and an attempt by Pakistan to hide its own actions.

The Indian Armed Forces said that in response to the Pakistani attack, they had carried out SEAD/DEAD operations, neutralizing Pakistani air defence systems in Lahore. Pakistani authorities said that several Indian drones intruded in Pakistani airspace, and 12 Indian drones were shot down. As per Pakistan, these drones were sent into nine different locations including the cities of Karachi and Lahore, and one of the drones struck a Pakistani military facility near Lahore. The Pakistani military later claimed to have shot down 25 Israeli-made Harop loitering munitions in its territory. India admitted to one being taken down. A drone also landed near the Rawalpindi Cricket Stadium complex before the start of a Pakistan Super League match, prompting the Pakistan Cricket Board to postpone the game.

Later that day, India said that Pakistan had launched airstrikes directed in and around Jammu district including the airport and the university. All of the eight Pakistani missiles were claimed to have been intercepted by the S-400 missile system. Reportedly, multiple explosions were heard in Jammu along with an explosion in Jaisalmer, where drones and fighter jets were also reported. India later said that, these attacks involved 300–400 Turkish-Asisguard Songar drones targeting 36 sites, including civilian and military infrastructure. India also reported cross border firing by heavy calibre artillery guns along the Line of Control (LoC).

Reports termed this conflict as the "first drone war" between the "nuclear-armed neighbours" of South Asia.

=== 9 May ===
The Pakistan Army claimed to have neutralised 77 Indian drones since 6 May.

Exchanges of fire had stopped in the early morning. However, clashes restarted after "13 hours of relative calm". Exchanges of artillery fire began in Kashmir, including in, Kupwara, Poonch, Uri, and Samba along the LoC. According to the Indian Army, drones were reportedly sighted in 26 locations across a wide area from Baramulla in the north to Bhuj in the south, with at least one armed drone in Punjab; however, Pakistani officials dismissed the Indian accusations as "baseless and misleading", denying any offensive actions. India claimed that a Pakistani army post along the LoC was destroyed.

During a press briefing, Pakistan once again denied carrying out missile and drone strikes on Indian military installations and proposed a neutral third-party investigation into the 2025 Pahalgam attack, which it claimed was ignored by India. On 9 May, reports indicated that India had repositioned its Western Fleet, including an aircraft carrier, destroyers, frigates and anti-submarine warfare ships, in the northern Arabian Sea. The Indian government claimed that Pakistan let civilian aircraft through Pakistan as a distraction to let in 300-400 drones into Northern India. According to an Indian defence source cited by The Daily Telegraph, the fleet was brought within operational range of Karachi, Pakistan's largest port city and the headquarters of the Pakistan Navy.

=== 10 May ===
On 10 May, India accused Pakistan of launching missile attacks on air bases in Punjab in the early hours, including the Pathankot military airfield. According to The Indian Express, a Fatah-II long-range missile was intercepted near the Sirsa Air Force Station shortly after midnight.

At 2:09 am, Pakistan's Nur Khan airbase in Rawalpindi was struck by Indian missiles. India said the next morning that it had launched attacks on Pakistan's air bases in response to the drone and missile attacks along India's western border. It described them as precision attacks on identified military targets. It said Pakistan Air Force bases at Rafiqui, Murid, Chaklala, and Rahim Yar Khan Airport as having been targeted. The strikes also targeted military sites in Sukkur and Chunian, a radar installation in Pasrur, the Sialkot aviation base, and other air bases at Skardu, Sargodha, Jacobabad, and Bholari.

Around 3:20 am, Pakistan denied initiating hostilities, instead alleging that India had first fired air-to-surface missiles from fighter jets at the military bases of Nur Khan, Rafiqui, and Murid, and added that India had also targeted Afghanistan with missile and drone strikes.

Shortly after the Indian missile strikes, Pakistan launched a retaliatory operation, codenamed Operation Bunyan-um-Marsoos. It claimed to have struck and caused major damage to 26 military targets, including 15 air bases of Suratgarh, Sirsa, Naliya, Adampur, Bhatinda, Barnala, Halwara, Awantipur, Srinagar, Jammu, Udhampur, Mamoon, Ambala and Pathankot. It further said that the BrahMos storage facilities at Beas and Nagrota were destroyed, and that two S-400 systems at Adampur and Bhuj were neutralised by the Pakistan Air Force. Pakistan said that military logistics and support sites such as the Field Supply Depot in Uri and Radar Station in Poonch were targeted, and command headquarters such as 10 Brigade and 80 Brigade at KG Top and Nowshera, as well as proxy training and intelligence fusion facilities in Rajouri and Nowshera, were destroyed. Pakistan further said that Indian military elements across the LoC, including headquarters, logistic bases, artillery positions, and posts, were heavily damaged. It said that its drones flew over major Indian cities and sensitive political and military sites, including New Delhi.

Pakistan's military said it launched a cyberattack as part of Operation Bunyun Marsoos, targeting Indian military satellites, government websites, and critical digital infrastructure. Indian authorities recorded over 1.5 million attempted cyber intrusions. According to reports by Pakistani media, affected entities included the official website of India's ruling party, the Bharatiya Janata Party (BJP), the Crime Research Investigation Agency, Mahanagar Telephone Nigam Limited, Bharat Earth Movers Limited, and the All India Naval Technical Supervisory Staff Association. Those reports said that large volumes of data were erased from these websites, and sensitive information was leaked from key institutions such as Hindustan Aeronautics Limited, the Border Security Force, and the Unique Identification Authority of India. The cyberattack was also reported in Pakistani media to have compromised databases belonging to the Indian Air Force, the Maharashtra Election Commission, and the takeover of more than 2,500 surveillance cameras across India.

India denied Pakistan's claims that its BrahMos missile base, airfields in Sirsa, Jammu, Pathankot, Bhatinda, Nalia and Bhuj, and ammunition depots in Chandigarh and Beas had been damaged. It also rejected Pakistan's claims that the S-400 defence system and airfield at Suratgarh had been destroyed, calling these allegations part of a "malicious misinformation campaign". Indian officials acknowledged limited damage at four of its air bases — Udhampur, Pathankot, Adampur, and Bhuj — and the family of one Indian soldier confirmed his death at Udhampur.

The Prime Minister of Pakistan Shehbaz Sharif later said in his speech on the Independence Day of Azerbaijan that the operation had already been initially planned for 4:30 am but India attacked before that time. In an earlier speech, he had said that the Army Chief called him at 2:30 am to inform him about the Indian airstrikes and sought permission to strike back. The Army Chief is said to have called back later in the night informing him about "befitting response" and adding, "we are being requested for a ceasefire". PM Sharif said he told him to go ahead and accept the offer.

Intense firing and shelling were reported along the Line of Control, including in Sialkot and Rajouri. Local officials in India reported that at least five people were killed in Pakistani shelling in Rajouri, Poonch, and Jammu districts. Analyst Michael Kugelman posited that the two countries were now "effectively at war".

State media PTV News reported that Prime Minister Shehbaz Sharif had convened a meeting of the National Command Authority, the body responsible for Pakistan's nuclear weapons programme, although Defence Minister Khawaja Asif said that no such meeting had taken place.

A ceasefire began at 17:00 (IST)/16:30 (PKT). It was first announced by US President Donald Trump on social media, and the Indian and Pakistani foreign ministers subsequently confirmed the agreement. Both sides claimed victory after the ceasefire. Pakistani prime minister Shehbaz Sharif designated 16 May to be celebrated as Youm-e-Tashakur ('Day of Gratitude') in honour of its armed forces.

== Ceasefire ==
A fragile ceasefire was achieved around midday on Saturday, 10 May, with the intervention of the United States. The US administration grew concerned with the possibility of nuclear weapon involvement, and the Secretary of State Marco Rubio started making calls from 4:00 PKT. He spoke to Pakistan's Army chief Asim Munir, National Security Advisor Asim Malik and prime minister Shehbaz Sharif. United States Vice President JD Vance was in touch with the Indian authorities, including prime minister Narendra Modi. Interventions were also made by Saudi Arabia, Iran, the UAE and the UK. The Indian and Pakistani heads of military operations spoke on phone at 2:30 pm for the first time since the conflict broke out.

=== Agreement ===
Foreign Secretary of India Vikram Misri and the Pakistani Foreign Minister Ishaq Dar stated that both militaries agreed to a full ceasefire and that hostilities would end as of 5:00 p.m. IST/4:30 pm PKT (11:30 GMT).

Dar stated that 36 countries helped broker the truce. However, an Indian official told Agence France Presse that the ceasefire was negotiated bilaterally in the sense that "stoppage of firing and military action between India and Pakistan was worked out directly between the two countries". United States Secretary of State Marco Rubio declared that both nations would discuss "a broad set of issues at a neutral site" and that he and Vice President JD Vance had extensively corresponded with senior officials on both sides. Hours later, following ceasefire violations, Indian officials had not yet voiced readiness for talks. US president Donald Trump made a post on social media about the ceasefire soon after it came into effect, prior to the official announcements by the Indian and Pakistani foreign ministers. Pakistani Prime Minister Sharif stated that Trump had played a "pivotal and paramount role" in facilitating the truce along with representatives of Saudi Arabia, Turkey, Qatar, the UK, UN, and China, while India's foreign secretary later said that ceasefire talks were held "directly between India and Pakistan under the existing channels established between both militaries." Thanking the heads of India and Pakistan, President Trump vowed to enhance trade "substantially" with both nations. On 29 July, Indian Defence Minister Rajnath Singh rejected Trump's claim that he had ended the conflict, describing it as "baseless".

Following the agreement, Pakistan reopened its airspace to commercial flights. Military hotlines between the two states were activated.

=== Accusations of violations ===
10 May: Minutes after the ceasefire announcement, loud explosions were heard and projectiles were seen in the sky over the cities of Srinagar and Jammu in Indian-administered Jammu and Kashmir. Late on 10 May, Misri stated that there had been violations of the ceasefire agreement, citing cross-border firing and sightings of Pakistani drones over Srinagar and Punjab, and called on Pakistani authorities to "address [the] violations". Jammu and Kashmir Chief Minister Omar Abdullah also reported explosions in Srinagar, expressing concern over the apparent collapse of the ceasefire. Pakistani Information Minister Atta Tarar denied Indian claims that Pakistan had violated the ceasefire, calling reports by the Indian media as "baseless". Pakistan later also accused India of committing ceasefire violations in Pakistan-administered Kashmir. By 11 May, reports suggested that "serious violations" of the truce had ceased, and that the situation had stabilized in many cities on the Indian side of the LoC. Businesses reopened in Srinagar as calm returned. In India, Gujarat Minister of State Harsh Sanghavi announced that a blackout would be implemented in the Kutch district after drones were spotted in the sky. In Pakistan, civilians in Peshawar heard anti-aircraft gunfire after drones were spotted in the sky.

12 May: Indian media claimed that "suspected Pakistani drones" were detected and engaged in the Samba district of Indian-administered Jammu and Kashmir. Blackouts were imposed in several border towns including Amritsar as a precautionary measure. After midnight, the Indian Army said, "no drone activity has been detected recently, and the ceasefire situation prevails."

== Aerial strikes and skirmishes ==
=== Operation Sindoor ===
==== Initial strikes ====
On 7 May 2025, India launched missile and air strikes on nine alleged "militant camps" in both Pakistan and Pakistan-administered Kashmir. The strikes, lasted just 25 minutes between 01:05 and 01:30 India time (19:35 and 20:00 GMT on Tuesday). Seven targets, including some in Pakistan-administered Kashmir, were struck by the Indian Army's artillery regiment using precision long-range M982 Excalibur rounds and loitering munitions, while air defence was jointly provided by the Army and the Indian Air Force. The Israeli press mentioned Indo-Israeli SkyStriker loitering munitions. The attacks on targets in Pakistani Punjab were carried out by the Indian Air Force. According to sources cited by India Today, Rafale jets were employed, equipped with SCALP missiles and AASM Hammer bombs. In press releases by Press Information Bureau, the Indian government claimed that during the first strikes on terror camps the Indian Air Force had "bypassed and jammed Pakistan's Chinese-supplied air defence systems" and the operation was conducted without the loss of any Indian asset.

The missile strikes targeted locations including Subhan Allah Mosque in Bahawalpur (near Ahmedpur East) and Markaz-e-Taiba in Muridke, part of the headquarters of JeM and the headquarters of LeT respectively and alleged by India to be their terrorist training camps. (Note: Sources mentioning headquarters:) Other sites claimed to have been targeted by India included Abbas Mosque (associated with the JeM) in Kotli District, Shawai Nala camp (associated with the LeT) and Syedna Bilal Mosque (associated with the JeM) in Muzaffarabad, a site in Gulpur, Kotli District (alleged by the Indian government to be a LeT and HuM camp); Markaz Ahl-e-Hadith in Barnala, Bhimber District (alleged by the Indian government to be associated with the LeT); a site in Mehmona Joya, Kotli Loharan West, Sialkot District (alleged by the Indian government to be a HuM camp); and a site in Tera Katlan in Sarjal, Shakargarh Tehsil, Sialkot District (alleged by the Indian government to be a JeM camp). Satellite images released after launching the strikes showed the extent of damage in Pakistan. According to CNN, Indian jets have previously bombed Pakistani territory following militant attacks on its soil but "Wednesday's operation is the deepest India has struck inside its neighbor since the Indo-Pakistan war of 1971, the biggest of several wars between the two countries."

Pakistan confirmed strikes on six of the sites targeted by India, denying the strikes at Barnala and Gulpur in Pakistan-administered Azad Kashmir, but said these were civilian areas including mosques and residential areas and were not terrorist facilities.

==== Aerial skirmishes ====
The Indian air strikes triggered an aerial battle in which more than 114 aircraft, 72 from the IAF and 42 from the PAF, were involved in what was described as the largest beyond visual range engagement on the India–Pakistan border, with the engagement described as one of the largest air battles since the end of World War II. According to independent assessments, at least four Indian fighter aircraft were downed, though Pakistan claimed five, including three Rafales, one MiG-29, one SU-30MKI and a Heron unmanned aerial vehicle. If true, it would be first time that a French-origin Dassault Rafale has been lost in combat, reportedly having been shot down by the Chinese-origin Chengdu J-10. Pakistan's response also included the use of Chinese-produced PL-15 long-range air-to-air missiles fired from Chengdu J-10 fighter jets, marking the first combat use of the missile. The presence of air-launched PL-15 debris at multiple sites within India was indicative that some of the downings were caused by the PAF.

Chief of Staff of the French Air and Space Force Général d'armée aérienne Jérôme Bellanger stated that he had "seen evidence" of three aircraft being downed including a Rafale, a Mirage 2000 and a Russian Sukhoi. Reuters reported that unnamed Indian government sources said that three fighter jets had crashed in India due to unknown causes. On 8 May, an unnamed US official told Reuters that he assessed with "high confidence" that Pakistani J-10 aircraft had shot down at least two Indian fighter jets; a second official assessed one of the downed jets to be a Dassault Rafale. The Washington Post later said that it had identified 3 crash sites in India from 7 May, identifying two of them as belonging to an Indian Dassault Rafale and Dassault Mirage 2000 at Akalia Kalan in Bathinda and Wuyan in Pampore respectively and another site at Akhnoor (likely an Indian MiG-29). The Rafale crash in Bathinda also reportedly killed two bystanders. On 9 May, local government sources in Indian-administered Jammu and Kashmir told Reuters that three fighter jets crashed in India on 7 May with three pilots being hospitalized.

On 11 May, the Indian Air Force said that "losses are a part of combat" but declined to provide further details, adding that all pilots were back home. According to France 24, India's refusal to confirm or deny the loss of the jets gave further credence to the downing claims. Defence analyst Michael Clarke told Al Jazeera that if India had lost a Rafale jet, "that would certainly be embarrassing." He added that if the aircraft had come down within Indian territory, India would likely try to keep it as an unconfirmed rumour for as long as possible, and that its general statement on "inevitable losses" might be the closest it comes to confirmation.

On 15 May, Pakistani prime minister Shehbaz Sharif claimed that Pakistan shot down six Indian fighter jets, the sixth being a Mirage 2000. On 28 May, he again said that six Indian fighter jets were downed but said that four of these were Rafale, one MiG-29 and one "another plane". The PAF provided the tail numbers BS001, BS021, BS022, and BS027 of four Rafale aircraft it claimed to have shot down to Dassault so the manufacturer could confirm whether the aircraft were still operational. One of the Rafale aircraft, identified by the callsign Godzilla 4, was destroyed over Akalia Kalan, a village in Bathinda in Punjab, India, approximately 70 km from the India–Pakistan border, while returning to Ambala Air Force Station, home to a major wing of the IAF's Western Air Command. The downed jet was identified as Rafale EH BS001. On 6 June, the PAF said that No. 15 Squadron, also known as the Cobras, was responsible for shooting down IAF fighter jets. The unit operated out of PAF Base Minhas in Kamra with J-10C multirole fighters equipped with PL-15 beyond-visual-range missiles. According to Dawn, the Cobras deployed 18 out of the 20 aircraft assigned to the squadron for the intercept operation on 7 May. On 31 May 2025, India's Chief of Defence Staff General Anil Chauhan admitted that India lost jets, but dismissed Pakistan's claim of downing six fighter jets. On 18 July 2025, President of the United States Donald Trump said that he believed five aircraft had been shot down during the conflict. According to The Washington Quarterly, India confirmed the loss of at least three aircraft during the conflict, although the types were not specified. It is likely that India lost at least four aircraft, possibly a fifth, including at least one Rafale and a MiG-29; and that Pakistan also likely lost aircraft.

==== Indian strikes on Pakistani air bases ====
On 8 May 2025, in response to a series of drone incursions and missile attacks, which India attributed to Pakistan despite its denials of involvement, India carried out strikes and claimed to have damaged air defence radars and systems at multiple locations in Pakistan. Pakistan reported drone incursions or intercepts at 11 sites that morning, and officially acknowledged that four soldiers were injured and military equipment was partially damaged. The strikes destroyed an air defence radar in Lahore.

Local media in India reported a barrage of drone and missile strikes on the night of 9 May. Hours later, on the night of 9 and 10 May, the Indian Armed Forces conducted multiple airstrike operations targeting Pakistani military installations. As per Indian media reports, the air strikes were planned by India's Chief of the Air Staff Amar Preet Singh while National Security Advisor Ajit Doval granted the final clearance. A wave of one-way loitering munitions, including Israeli-made IAI Harop and Polish Warmate 5.0 drones, was deployed. These drones served dual purposes, probing and assessing the reaction parameters of HQ-9BE short-range SAM systems and neutralising or degrading the target acquisition and illumination radars of HQ-16FE medium-range SAM systems. This preparatory tactic weakened the defensive envelope of the targeted sites, thereby facilitating the success of the subsequent cruise missile strikes. According to Pakistan, the PAF intercepted and destroyed 84 Israeli-made Harop drones sent by India.

The drone strikes were followed by Su-30MKI aircraft of the IAF launching between fifteen and eighteen supersonic BrahMos missiles, typically one per aircraft, caused considerable damage. Simultaneously, Rafale EH aircraft from No. 17 Squadron employed at least ten SCALP-EG missiles. These precision strikes were focused on degrading Pakistan's air defense capabilities and operational infrastructure. The targets included four early warning radar installations, seven PAF air bases, and one forward operating base. PAF Base Nur Khan came under both missile and drone attacks. A missile strike hit the operations room of the 35 Composite Transport Wing, destroying two fuel trucks, with collateral damage to at least one C-130 Hercules medium-lift tactical transport aircraft.The barrage took out two roofs and hit the hangar of a refueling plane, according to one of the officials, who visited the base the next day. According to William Goodhind, a geospatial analyst at Contested Ground, two mobile control centers at the Nur Khan airbase were damaged. An apparent missile strike created a 60 ft (18 m)-wide hole in an aircraft hangar at PAF Base Bholari. Debris was scattered across the pavement around the hangar, and the wall appeared to have collapsed onto a nearby building. This strike damaged a Saab 2000 Erieye AEW&CS, which the PAF said was later repaired. PAF Base Shahbaz was also attacked, resulting in a 100 ft (30 m)-wide hole in an aircraft hangar as well as damage to its air traffic control tower. At PAF Base Mushaf, the Indian military claimed to have used precision weapons to strike two sections of the runway. Later satellite imagery showed a crater on the runway. The runway was made operational within a few hours. At PAF Base Murid and PAF Base Rafiqui, BrahMos missiles targeted an Unmanned aerial vehicle (UAV) command shelter and the operations room of the 34 Tactical Air Wing, respectively. At PAF Base Sukkur, a hangar and an electronic warfare (EW) radar installation were destroyed by missile strikes.

Satellite imagery taken after the Indian strike showed a crater on the Rahim Yar Khan Airport runway that was not present in earlier images. The airport's Royal Lounge was damaged in the attack and a 10 ft (3.0 m)-wide crater was created in the apron area. The air strikes were also executed against early warning radar installations of the Pakistan Army Air Defence Corps (PAADC), including one located in Gujranwala.

Pakistan Army spokesman said that India fired ballistic missiles from Adampur that fell into its own territory, and added that India had targeted Afghanistan with missile and drone strikes. PAF spokesperson displayed radar signatures of the BrahMos on screen and said the missiles had missed their targets and flown into Afghanistan. India denied the allegations, calling the claims "ludicrous" and "frivolous". The Taliban government of Afghanistan also denied Pakistani claims of Indian attacks on Afghanistan. It was termed a "bizarre and unsubstantiated claim" by Christopher Clary.

Pakistan said that all Pakistan Air Force (PAF) assets at targeted bases remained safe. Pakistani media reported that Sheikh Zayed International Airport in Rahim Yar Khan was targeted and suffered structural damage. The airport was named after Sheikh Zayed bin Sultan Al Nahyan and is regarded as a symbol of Pak-UAE friendship. Although commercial flights have been suspended since 2023, the airport was occasionally used by members of the House of Nahyan via the Royal Lounge, which was among the facilities destroyed in the attack. The Pakistan military later confirmed that six of its airmen were killed during the Indian air strikes including 5 deaths at Bholari and one at Sargodha; Chief Minister of Sindh, Murad Ali Shah, also later said that nine personnel were injured in Indian attacks.

=== Operation Bunyan-um-Marsoos ===
In retaliation for Indian strikes, the PAF carried out a coordinated retaliatory air campaign. The primary objective of the operation was to disrupt IAF infrastructure and operational readiness, particularly by targeting airbases and logistical nodes near the Indo-Pakistani border. JF-17 multirole fighter aircraft launched stand-off munitions, including air-launched cruise missiles, against several Indian military installations, including Udhampur, Adampur, and Pathankot air force stations, as well as weapon storage facilities in Uri, Nagrota, and Beas. The PAF struck and destroyed the Integrated Air Command and Control System (IACCS) at Barnala, effectively stopping communications between the IAF leadership and its fighters.

JF-17C Thunder Block 3 aircraft from No. 14 Squadron, and operating from PAF Base Rafiqui, conducted a Destruction of Enemy Air Defence (DEAD) mission to destroy the S-400 system at Adampur. The aircraft employed electronic countermeasures, decoys, and evasive manoeuvres to approach the S-400 system and fired CM-400AKG missiles at low-altitude and early-warning radar installations. Pakistan said that a mobile 91N6E (NATO name "Big Bird") acquisition radar was destroyed by a CM-400AKG, and that a 96L6E (NATO name "Cheese Board") 3D early-warning and acquisition radar was also successfully targeted. According to AirForces Monthly, independent analysis of low-resolution satellite images revealed evidence of burn marks and disturbed ground at the suspected S-400 site, suggesting that key components of the battery may have been struck or degraded. In another report, AirForces Monthly said that one thing is certain that without on-site photographs, authenticated radar recordings, and parametric analysis, what truly occurred between these two systems remains, for the time being, a matter of speculation and personal interpretation.

PAF also deployed domestically developed unmanned aerial vehicles (UAVs), described as "killer drones" over multiple locations in India. The drones flew over airbases carrying up to 20 kg of explosives. Over several hours, the PAF struck 34 targets across different Indian bases, with approximately half targeted by manned aircraft and the remainder by UAVs. India said that its air defence systems successfully intercepted and shot down hundreds of drones and loitering munitions launched by Pakistan. The Indian Army released images of what it said were debris of Pakistani YIHA-III kamikaze drones destroyed by air defence units. It said multiple armed drones were spotted flying over Khasa Cantonment in Amritsar at approximately 5 am and that the attempt had endangered residential areas.

According to The New York Times, satellite images of the sites Pakistan claimed to have struck, did not clearly show damage caused by Pakistani strikes, even at bases where there was corroborating evidence of some military action. According to The Washington Quarterly, Pakistan was largely unable to suppress Indian air defences or cause significant physical damage specifically with just its drone attacks.

=== Nuclear concerns ===
The New York Times reported that explosions at the Nur Khan air base heightened U.S. concern that the conflict could "quickly go nuclear." The base lies close to the headquarters of Pakistan's Strategic Plans Division, which oversees the country's nuclear arsenal. On 14 May, Reuters reported that Indian strikes on Nur Khan air base had caused concern among U.S. officials, who became seriously worried that the conflict could spiral out of control. Christopher Clary, an associate professor at the University at Albany, said: "So, an attack on the facility may have been perceived as more dangerous than India intended — and the two sides should not conclude that it is possible to have a conflict without it going nuclear."

According to The New York Times, local media in Pakistan reported that Prime Minister Shehbaz Sharif had summoned a meeting of the National Command Authority (NCA), the body responsible for decisions regarding the use of nuclear weapons, although Pakistan's defence minister denied that any such meeting took place. Clary, citing CNN's chronology, said that U.S. fears of escalation had already intensified before reports of the NCA meeting.

Both India's Chief of Defence Staff, General Anil Chauhan, and Pakistan's Chairman Joint Chiefs of Staff Committee, General Sahir Shamshad Mirza, confirmed that at no time during the conflict any of the nations had considered the use of nuclear weapons.

== Casualties ==
=== India ===
India said that 21 civilians and 8 military and paramilitary personnel had died in the conflict primarily due to cross border shelling. The majority of the deaths and injuries were from mortar shelling by Pakistan in the Jammu region of Indian-administered Jammu and Kashmir particularly its Poonch district, where Indian media sources said that a gurudwara, a school and several houses were damaged in the attacks, leaving 14 civilians and 2 Indian soldiers dead. Pakistani shelling hit in and near the Christ School compound, a Carmelites of Mary Immaculate congregation Catholic school in Poonch, killing two students and damaging the nearby convent of the Congregation of Mother of Carmel. A Pakistani loitering munition resulted in the death of a civilian in the Firozpur district of Punjab, the only Indian death outside Indian-administered Jammu and Kashmir. An Indian Air Force soldier was killed following Pakistan's airstrike on Udhampur Air Force Station, and a deputy commissioner was killed during Pakistani shelling in Rajouri. Pakistan claimed that around 25–50 Indian soldiers were killed.

=== Pakistan ===
Pakistan said that 40 civilians and 13 military personnel were killed during the conflict from Indian air strikes and cross-border shelling (the latter in Pakistan-administered Azad Kashmir). Pakistan said that the initial Indian airstrikes on 7 May killed at least 21 civilians and denied presence of militants at any of the targeted locations. Indian loitering munitions killed a civilian near the Rawalpindi Cricket Stadium, two others in Daharki and Jabbi Kasran and a Pakistan Army soldier in Lahore. The Pakistan military confirmed that six of its airmen were killed during Indian air strikes on 10 May, including 5 deaths at PAF Base Bholari and one at PAF Base Mushaf. India claimed that at least 100 militants had been killed in the missile strikes, and that Pakistan lost 35 to 40 personnel in the conflict.

Masjid Syedna Bilal in Muzaffarabad and Masjid-e-Abbas in Kotli (identified by India as Markaz Abbas) both in Pakistan-administered Azad Kashmir were damaged in the Indian strikes and killed 5 civilians according to Pakistan. The Markaz-e-Taiba, a complex which includes a school, a college and a medical clinic, was hit in Muridke. It was established by Lashkar-e-Taiba's co-founder Hafiz Saeed and serves as its headquarters, and that of its front organisation the Jamaat-ud-Dawa. Al-Jazeera noted this site as the most significant among the others hit by India. Dawn reported that that at least 3 civilians were killed in the Indian strike.

Bahawalpur's Jamia Masjid Subhan Allah, the headquarters of Jaish-e-Mohammed, was also one of the targets in the Indian strikes. Indian media reports claimed that Jaish leader Abdul Rauf Azhar was killed in the strike, though this remains unconfirmed and his brother Masood did not name him among the deceased family members.

== Analysis ==
According to The New York Times, India's role was "assertive" and "aggressive", and possibly established a new level of deterrence with Pakistan. The Times noted that in its initial strikes, India struck targets deeper inside enemy territory than it had struck in previous decades and had hit close enough to locations affiliated with "terrorist activities" that India could claim victory against these groups. At the end of the conflict, it published high-resolution before and after satellite images, which showed India's edge in targeting of Pakistan's military facilities and airfields. It reported that India felt frustrated after Donald Trump's public claims of mediating a cease-fire, presenting both countries as equals and downplaying the terrorist attack that triggered the conflict, and that India had hoped any US involvement would remain discreet, and Trump's portrayal of both countries on equal terms was seen by Indian officials as politically sensitive and diplomatically frustrating. According to the paper, the result of the conflict was "little more than a draw". Noting that despite India damaging sensitive Pakistani airbases, hangars and runways, it lost aircraft in aerial duels. It opined that the conflict had been a strategic setback for India, which found itself equated with Pakistan, a smaller, weaker country that Indian officials call a rogue sponsor of terrorism. It added that diplomatically, India appeared powerless to resolve the conflict and that the spectre of nuclear war limited what India could achieve militarily.

According to The Washington Post, Pakistan's celebration that "ceasefire with India reestablished deterrence", "may be clouding a clearheaded assessment" and the "regional status quo had been upended" with more aggressive strikes by India, including a strike at Pakistan's military headquarters. The Post said that, according to analysts, the alleged losses of Indian aircraft would constitute a humiliation of the Indian military.

According to the French newspaper Le Monde, this military operation against Pakistan revealed weaknesses in the Indian Air Force, and that the success of the Pakistan Air Force had to do with the superior training and combat experience of most of the pilots as they had been fighting continuous counterterrorism air campaigns in the Federally Administered Tribal Areas, whereas India had largely remained at peace. It said that the major military confrontation "produced no winners."

According to Al Jazeera, analysts contend that neither side emerged with a definite upper hand, and both nations made certain strategic gains even as they each also suffered losses. Al Jazeera further reported that analysts noted that Pakistan's gains included internationalising the Kashmir issue and the downing of aircraft, while India's gains involved highlighting alleged Pakistan-based terrorism and demonstrating further military reach across the border.

The Financial Times, noting that both India and Pakistan claimed victory, said the ceasefire gave Islamabad the "diplomatic upper hand", as US intervention bracketed India, the "fifth-biggest economy", with what it sees as a "terrorism-backing rogue state".

According to Manal Fatima of the Atlantic Council, the war appeared to unify fractured Pakistani political forces domestically and resulted in Pakistan having a diplomatic advantage over India regarding Trump's involvement in ceasefire talks. According to Srujan Palkar—global fellow at the Council—Operation Sindoor "exposed an imbalance in US policy toward South Asia". The expert noted that if the United States was to continue building trust with India, it must put "the onus on the Pakistani establishment to play its part in counterterrorism" as well as consider revoking Pakistan's Major Non-NATO Ally (MNNA) status.

According to the Swiss newspaper Neue Zürcher Zeitung, the reported downing of an Indian Rafale jet (made in France) by a Pakistani air-defense system (made in China) raises concerns for Western military technologies. It mentioned that Operation Sindoor by India appeared to have turned into a disaster. It failed to take out the targets quickly and without detection. The Indian pilots encountered strong resistance, with the operation resulting in heavy losses.

According to The Diplomat magazine's Pakistan correspondent Umair Jamal, Pakistan came out "emboldened" after clashes with India. He said that the conflict unified the country, that the Pakistani military has emerged more popular than earlier, and that the political leadership now see the need to strengthen the armed forces. He believed that Pakistan scored a diplomatic win by acting with "restraint" and found the US intervention to have favoured Pakistan more than India.

Christopher Clary, a University at Albany professor and expert on India–Pakistan relations, stated to The Washington Post that satellite evidence supports the claim that the Indian military inflicted significant, though not devastating, damage on Pakistan's air force at several eastern bases.

According to John Spencer and Vincent Viola, writing in the Small Wars Journal, Operation Sindoor was more than just a rapid military reaction — it marked a significant strategic turning point. In just four days, India carried out accurate strikes on fortified positions across the border using only domestically developed or assembled systems such as BrahMos missiles, Akashteer air defense units, and loitering munitions, without relying on US platforms or foreign logistics. India didn't just achieve victory — it demonstrated a clear military advantage over a Chinese-supported opponent. The operation highlighted a shift in national defense doctrine toward self-reliance and indigenous capability. As the journal notes, Pakistan, aligned with China in arms and strategy, was unable to counter India's precision offensive, with its Chinese-made air defenses proving ineffective.

American geopolitical analyst Brandon Weichert writing for The National Interest described the aerial duel between both countries as an unambiguous victory for Pakistan, insofar as western observers had not expected Chinese-made equipment to be able to shoot down the Rafales.

In a June 2025 report, AirForces Monthly described Operation Sindoor as a strategic success for the Indian Armed Forces in their counter-terrorism campaign against Pakistan-based militant groups, despite the loss of three combat aircraft during the operation. In an October 2025 report, the magazine described India's August 2025 claim, made three months after the conflict had concluded, that it had shot down five Pakistani fighter aircraft and an AEW&C Erieye using S-400 surface-to-air missiles at a range of 300 kilometres, "prompted ripples of disbelief," as the claim made by the air chief lacked supporting evidence and appeared to be an attempt to placate the Modi government, which was under pressure over the extent of the IAF's losses.

According to a 2025 U.S.-China Economic and Security Review Commission report, both countries struck targets deeper into each other's territories than at any time in fifty years. The report stated that Pakistan's forces achieved military success over India, marking the first active combat use of China's modern weapons systems, including the HQ-9, PL-15 and Chengdu J-10 platforms. It added that Pakistan's use of these systems to shoot down Indian aircraft became a selling point in China's post-conflict defence diplomacy.

== Impact ==
Pakistani airspace was closed for 48 hours and all flights were cancelled. In Pakistani Punjab, schools and colleges were closed, and CIE examinations were cancelled in most of Pakistan. In India, at least 25 airports in the north and west were shut down until 10 May. The Indian Air Force took control of Srinagar Airport and civil operations were stopped for an indefinite period.

The 2025 Indian Premier League transferred a match between Punjab Kings and the Mumbai Indians scheduled at Dharamsala on 11 May to Ahmedabad, citing the closure of Kangra Airport and other logistical issues caused by the ongoing tensions. Similarly, during the 2025 Pakistan Super League, a match between Karachi Kings and Peshawar Zalmi could not be played. On 9 May, both the tournaments were postponed because of worsening of the situation.

More than 8,000 Twitter accounts were blocked in India. The Indian government also blocked several Pakistani YouTube channels along with YouTube accounts of six Bangladeshi channels under the Section 69(A) of the Information Technology Act, 2000 citing a "threat to the national security or public discipline". This measure received protests from Bangladeshi government. X accounts of Chinese state-run media Xinhua News Agency and Global Times, and Turkish public broadcaster TRT World were also blocked in India. The Pakistan Telecommunication Authority blocked 79 Indian YouTube channels and websites citing "anti-Pakistan propaganda" which undermined "national unity".

Stock markets in India and Pakistan experienced significant volatility through the week due to escalating geopolitical tensions, but rebounded sharply on 12 May following the ceasefire agreement. Reports that a Rafale had been downed were followed by a dip in the share price of Dassault Aviation, the manufacturer of the aircraft. Indonesia, which had placed outstanding orders for Rafales, announced that it was reconsidering its procurement plans and was evaluating China's J-10C fighter as an alternative.

In China, a viral parody video mocking India over the reported downing of Rafale jets by Pakistani J-10C aircraft attracted significant attention, amassing millions of likes on Douyin and being reposted by Pakistan's Defence Ministry. The video was widely criticized as "racist and nationalistic", with commentators linking its popularity to rising Chinese nationalist sentiment. While the Chinese public embraced the incident as a win for domestic military tech, the Chinese government maintained diplomatic caution, urging both sides to exercise restraint amid regional tensions.

The Indian strikes on 7 May sparked protests against it in Pakistan. Protests and rallies took place in Peshawar and Islamabad, while political rallies were taken out in Karachi, Lahore (by the Pakistan Markazi Muslim League, a front of the Lashkar-e-Taiba), Muzaffarabad (by the Pasban-e-Hurriyat Jammu and Kashmir), and Mirpur. British Pakistani protestors demonstrated outside the Indian Embassy in London on 7 and 8 May.

Members of the Indian diaspora in France gathered in front of the Eiffel Tower to hold a protest against Pakistan after the strikes. Calls for a boycott of Turkey and Azerbaijan were raised on India social media due to their public support for Pakistan during the conflict. In Hyderabad, India, the protestors demanded to change the name of the Karachi Bakery, while in Hyderabad, Pakistan, the Bombay Bakery (named after Bombay, now Mumbai) was celebrated.

Ali Khan Mahmudabad, a professor from Ashoka University in India was arrested on 11 May on charges under laws concerning incitement of communal disharmony, subversive activity, and religious insult, following social media posts about India's Operation Sindoor. In his posts, he questioned the use of Muslim women officer Sofiya Qureshi for optics and highlighted issues like mob lynching on Muslims in India during the conflict. The incident sparked condemnation from over 1,200 academics and civil society members, who called it a crackdown on free speech and academic freedom. He was later granted interim bail by the Supreme Court of India. The legal case reached India's highest court, which granted Ali bail but restrained him from further commenting on the 2025 Pahalgam attack as well as Operation Sindoor. A three-member Special Investigation Team (SIT) has also been setup to look at the charges against him.

The National Cyber Crimes Investigation Agency of Pakistan arrested a senior National Database and Registration Authority official for allegedly sharing anti-army remarks on a WhatsApp work group.

=== Misinformation ===
There were a number of misinformation campaigns in both countries during the conflict, particularly on social media platform X. A rise in online hate speech on social media described as misogynistic, sexist, and promoting gender-related violence against women also saw a surge in both countries during the conflict.

Sumitra Badrinathan, an assistant political science professor at the American University, stated that misinformation about the rivalry between India and Pakistan often originated from anonymous online accounts, but during the ongoing conflict, misinformations at least on the Indian side had been put out by "previously credible journalists and major media outlets." South Asia analyst Michael Kugelman also noted a "very high volume of particularly egregious fake news" in Indian media outlets aligned with the government. Several Indian broadcast outlets reported unverified claims, including supposed strikes on a Pakistani nuclear base, downing two Pakistani fighter jets based on AI generated deepfakes, the Indian Army crossing the international border, Pakistan's Prime Minister Shehbaz Sharif fleeing to a bunker, Pakistan's Army Chief Asim Munir being deposed in a coup and arrested, capture of Pakistani capital Islamabad, and had also circulated stories such as the Indian Navy attacking Karachi Port, all of which were discredited.

According to the UK Defence Journal and the Washington Examiner, footage from a video game Arma 3 was shared by the official X (Twitter) handle of the Government of Pakistan, with Information Minister Attaullah Tarar praising the military's "timely and nerve-wracking response", as the video showing a jet being targeted went viral on social media during the conflict. A Daily Telegraph frontpage showing Pakistani aerial victory in the conflict, shared by Deputy Prime Minister Ishaq Dar in the Senate and by Ikhtiar Wali Khan online, was found to have been AI-generated by fact checkers. A CNN infographic purportedly verifying Pakistan's official claims of gains and losses in the conflict was similarly found to have been fabricated. False reports of Pakistan capturing Indian pilot Shivangi Singh were also widely circulated on Pakistani social media and were later deemed false by the Pakistan Army's media wing, the ISPR.

Deutsche Welle fact-checked several false claims on social media during the conflict. A video with over 5 million views, allegedly showing Indian missile strikes, was in fact footage of Iranian missiles hitting Israel published by DD India in October 2024. Another claim by a pro-Pakistan user that a French-made Rafale fighter, used by the Indian Air Force, was shot down in Pakistan, near Bahawalpur. The picture, in fact, was not a Rafale but a Pakistani Mirage 5 that crashed on a training mission in southeastern Pakistan three weeks before the conflict. Another viral video from a June 2024 crash of a Sukhoi Su-30MKI of the Indian Air Force in Nashik, Maharashtra was falsely shared as that of a Rafale jet shot down by Pakistan near the Line of Control.

Following social media rumours, India denied that it had struck the Kirana Hills Site (part of PAF Base Mushaf). The International Atomic Energy Agency also affirmed after investigations that there had been no radiation leak or release from any nuclear facility in Pakistan. False reports of a radiation leak notice by the Indian Atomic Energy Regulatory Board, after Pakistan claimed to have destroyed BrahMos storage facilities at Beas, were also shared on social media.

=== Airspace closures ===
Many Indian air carriers like Air India and IndiGo have been drastically affected on their international routes. IndiGo has had flight time to Central Asian destinations increase by 3 hours or more. Air India has had to divert most North America-bound flights to Vienna or Copenhagen in order to refuel their aircraft so that they can continue their flight.

Air India expects to face about $600 million in additional costs if a ban from Pakistan’s airspace lasts for a year and has asked the Indian government to compensate it for the hit.

On 24 June 2025, Pakistan extended its airspace closure for Indian aircraft and airlines until 24 July 2025, issuing a fresh Notice to Airmen (NOTAM) through its Civil Aviation Authority.

The Pakistan Airports Authority extended its airspace ban on Indian aircraft until 23 January 2026, as per a newly issued NOTAM. The restriction applies to all Indian commercial, military, and leased aircraft. Later, the Pakistan Airports Authority further extended the ban on Indian aircraft until 23 March 2026.

== Legal status ==
The Human Rights Commission of Pakistan (HRCP) stated that the casualties of the Indian air strikes were "a grave violation of international human rights law and could constitute crimes against humanity".

In The Hindu, legal journalist Aaratrika Bhaumik argued that for military self-defence to be legal under Article 51 of the Charter of the United Nations, military actions have to "immediately" be reported to the UN Security Council (UNSC). Bhaumik interpreted the Indian foreign minister's 8 May briefing of 13 of the 15 UNSC member states to be "apparent adherence" to the Article 51 requirement and stated that the International Court of Justice (ICJ) interpreted Article 51 to only be valid in the case of defence against attacks by non-state actors if a state were responsible for the attacks. O. P. Jindal Global University legal scholar Prabhash Ranjan interpreted the foreign minister to have avoided references to international law and to have attributed the attack to Pakistan as a state. He viewed the foreign minister's legal argument to be based on a contested Indian view of the right to defence against non-state actors presented at a February 2021 Arria formula meeting. Ranjan viewed the Indian military strikes of 7 May 2025 to have satisfied the principles of military necessity and proportionality.

== Reactions ==
=== India ===
The Indian government claimed that the operation was a necessary response to terrorism and the Pahalgam attack. Left parties in India urged Pakistan to dismantle terror networks operating from its soil. Addressing the nation on 11 May, Prime Minister Narendra Modi claimed another military victory over Pakistan and warned that further terrorist attacks would elicit a military response. Opposition leader Rahul Gandhi criticised Modi's acceptance of the ceasefire, alleging that it amounted to a surrender under pressure from Trump. On 9 June, Director General Military Operations (DGMO), Lieutenant General Rajiv Ghai was promoted to the additional post of Deputy Chief of Army Staff (Strategy), following his role in the operation.

=== Pakistan ===
Prime Minister Shehbaz Sharif called the Indian strikes a "cowardly" attack that killed innocent civilians, Pakistan termed them an "act of war", and the military vowed to respond at a time, place, and by means of its choosing. On 12 May, the National Assembly of Pakistan celebrated what was regarded as a Pakistani victory. The government of Pakistan promoted Chief of Army Staff Asim Munir to the rank of Field Marshal on 20 May 2025 for his leadership during the conflict. The tenure of Air Chief Marshal Zaheer Ahmad Babar was also extended. On 21 June, Pakistan announced it would nominate Donald Trump for the Nobel Peace Prize, citing his role in brokering the ceasefire.

== See also ==
- 2016 Indian Line of Control strike – Part of the continuing Indo–Pakistani conflict in Kashmir
- 2019 India–Pakistan border skirmishes – Series of armed skirmishes between India and Pakistan in Kashmir
  - 2019 Balakot airstrike – Airstrike conducted by the Indian Air Force
  - 2019 Jammu and Kashmir airstrikes – Airstrikes by Pakistan in Indian-administered Jammu and Kashmir
- Indus Waters Treaty – Water-distribution treaty between India and Pakistan
- 2025 Afghanistan–Pakistan conflict

== Bibliography ==
- Chesterton, Hannah; Bacon, Tricia (8 July 2025). "How We Assess Violent Non-State Actor Risk: Power Versus Threat". Studies in Conflict & Terrorism. Taylor & Francis Online. doi:10.1080/1057610X.2025.2528321. ISSN 1521-0731.
- Koren, Ore; Ganguly, Sumit; Khanna, Aashna (16 June 2021). "Fragile States, Technological Capacity, and Increased Terrorist Activity". Studies in Conflict & Terrorism. 46 (10). Taylor & Francis Online: 2066–2092. doi:10.1080/1057610X.2021.1937818. ISSN 1521-0731.
