= History of the Pakistan Air Force =

The history of the Pakistan Air Force (PAF) began when it was established in 1947 following the independence of Pakistan.

== British era ==
In 1933, the British colonial government established the first Air Force station in the British Raj near Drigh Road, now called PAF Base Faisal in Karachi. In 1934, this element of the Royal Indian Air Force (RIAF) was extended to the north for operations in North-West Frontier Province. The RIAF had also contributed to the defeat of Japanese invasion during World War II.

== 1947–1950: formative years ==
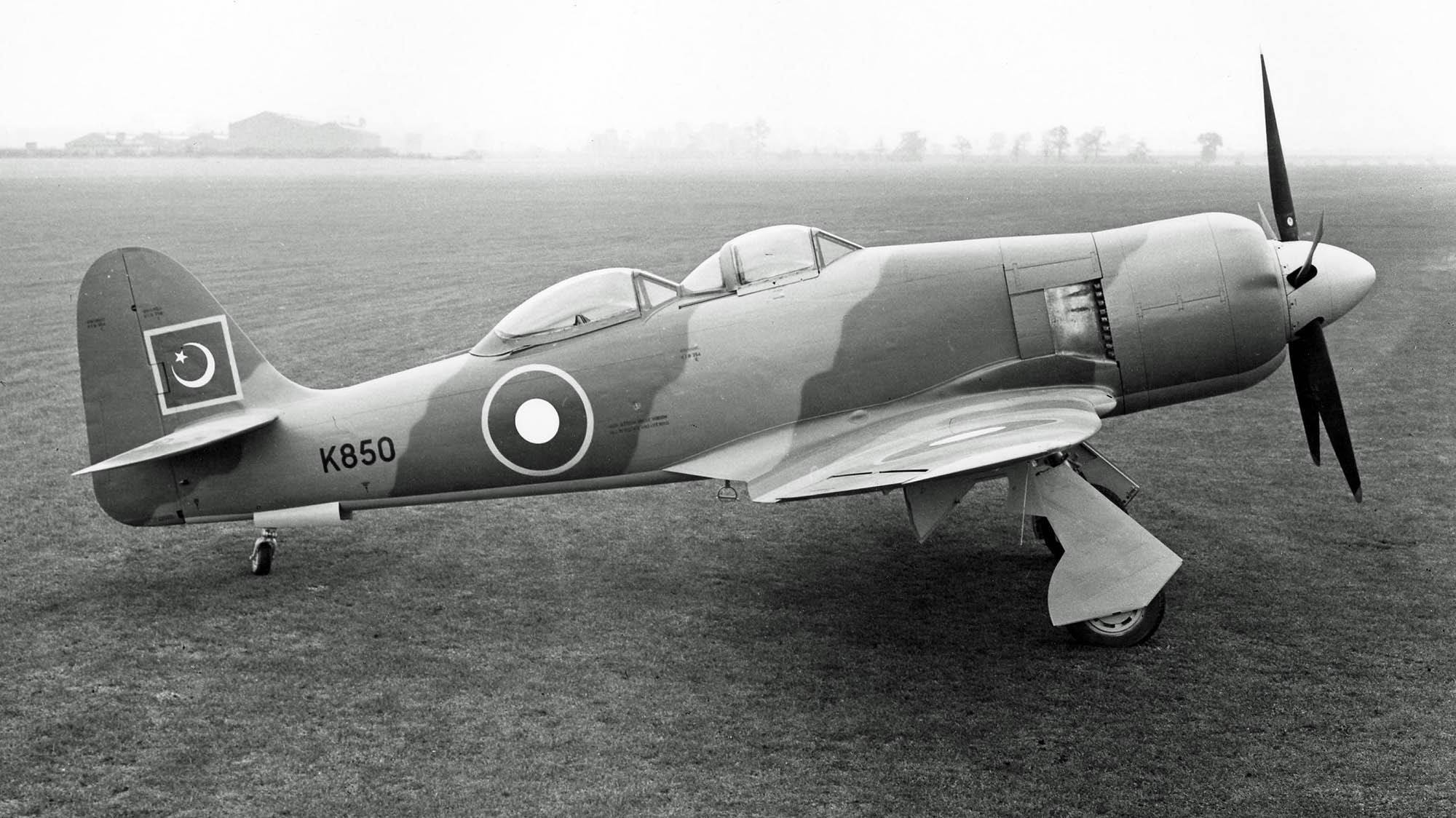
PAF Hawker Sea Fury two-seat trainer.

The Royal Pakistan Air Force (RPAF) was established on 15 August 1947 with the independence of Pakistan from British India. The RPAF began with a paper share allotment of 2,332 personnel, a fleet of 24 Hawker Tempest II fighter-bombers, 16 Supermarine Spitfire Mk VIII fighters, two Handley Page H.P.57 Halifax B.VIbombers, two Taylorcraft Auster J5F aircraft, twelve North American T-6G Harvard IV trainers and ten de Havilland DH.82A Tiger Moth biplanes. Very few were available to the RPAF on the ground as they were scattered throughout the British India to be given and collected later on. Of these very few were in flyable condition so that they could be used. Subsequently, it also got eight Douglas C-47B Dakota cargo planes which it used to transport supplies to soldiers fighting in the 1947 War in Kashmir against India. First two H.P.57 Halifax bombers were delivered in 1948 and were used during 1947 War for night-time supply drop missions at Skardu and other northern areas of Pakistan. All received against allotted at the time of independence of Pakistan from British India. It started with seven airbases scattered all over the provinces.

Operating these inherited aircraft was far from ideal because of their battered condition as most of them were not in a flyable condition especially in Pakistan's diverse terrains, deserts and mountains; frequent attrition and injuries did not make the situation any better.

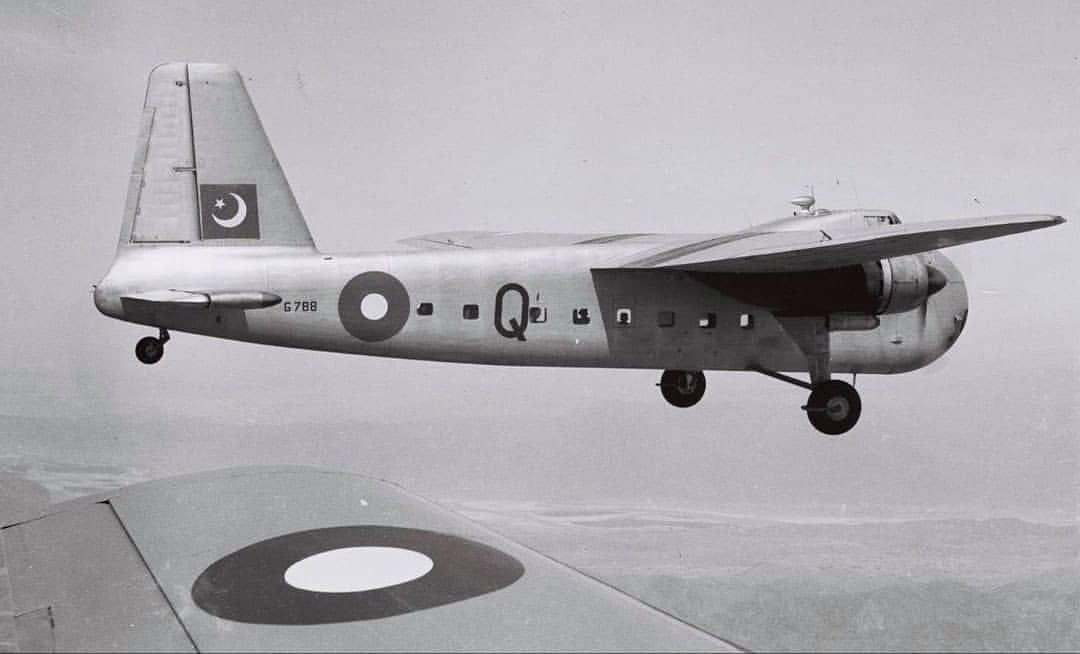
Pakistan Air Force Bristol Freighter

However, by 1948 the air force acquired better aircraft such as the Hawker Sea Fury FB.60 fighter-bomber and the Bristol Freighter Mk21E. These new aircraft gave a much-needed boost to the morale and combat capability of the Royal Pakistan Air Force; 93 Hawker Fury and roughly 40 Bristol Freighter aircraft were inducted into the RPAF by 1950. In 1949, Pakistan Air Force bombed the Afghan sponsored militant camps in border areas including an Afghan village to curb an unrest led by Ipi Faqir propagating independent Pashtunistan. Border clashes with Afghanistan were reported in 1949–50 for the first time. Later in 1953–54, the Pakistan Air Force led an operation from Miramshah airbase and heavily bombarded Faqir Ipi's headquarter in Gurwek.

== 1950–1958: the jet age ==
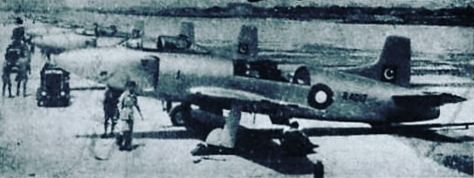
PAF Attackers from the No.11 Squadron (late 1950's)

Although the Royal Pakistan Air Force had limited funds to use and markets to choose from, it entered the jet age quite early. Initially it had planned to acquire US-built F-94Cs, F-86Fs, or F-84Gs and produce its order in Pakistan. However, lack of funds and strong British pressure persuaded the PAF to acquire the British Supermarine Attacker FB.50. The first squadron equipped with these aircraft was the No. 11 "Arrows".

In May 1954, Pakistan entered a Mutual Defence Assistance Agreement with the United States (USA), securing substantial economic and military aid in exchange for access to PAF bases for launching reconnaissance flights into the Soviet Union.

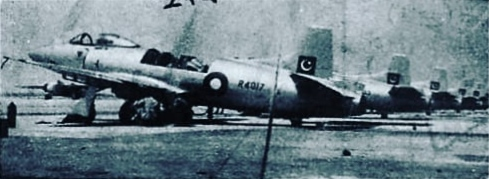
Pakistani Supermarine Attackers

The Supermarine Attacker had a rather unsatisfactory service in the Royal Pakistan Air Force with frequent attrition and maintenance problems. The prefix Royal was removed when Pakistan became a republic on 23 March 1956. It has since simply been called the Pakistan Air Force (PAF).

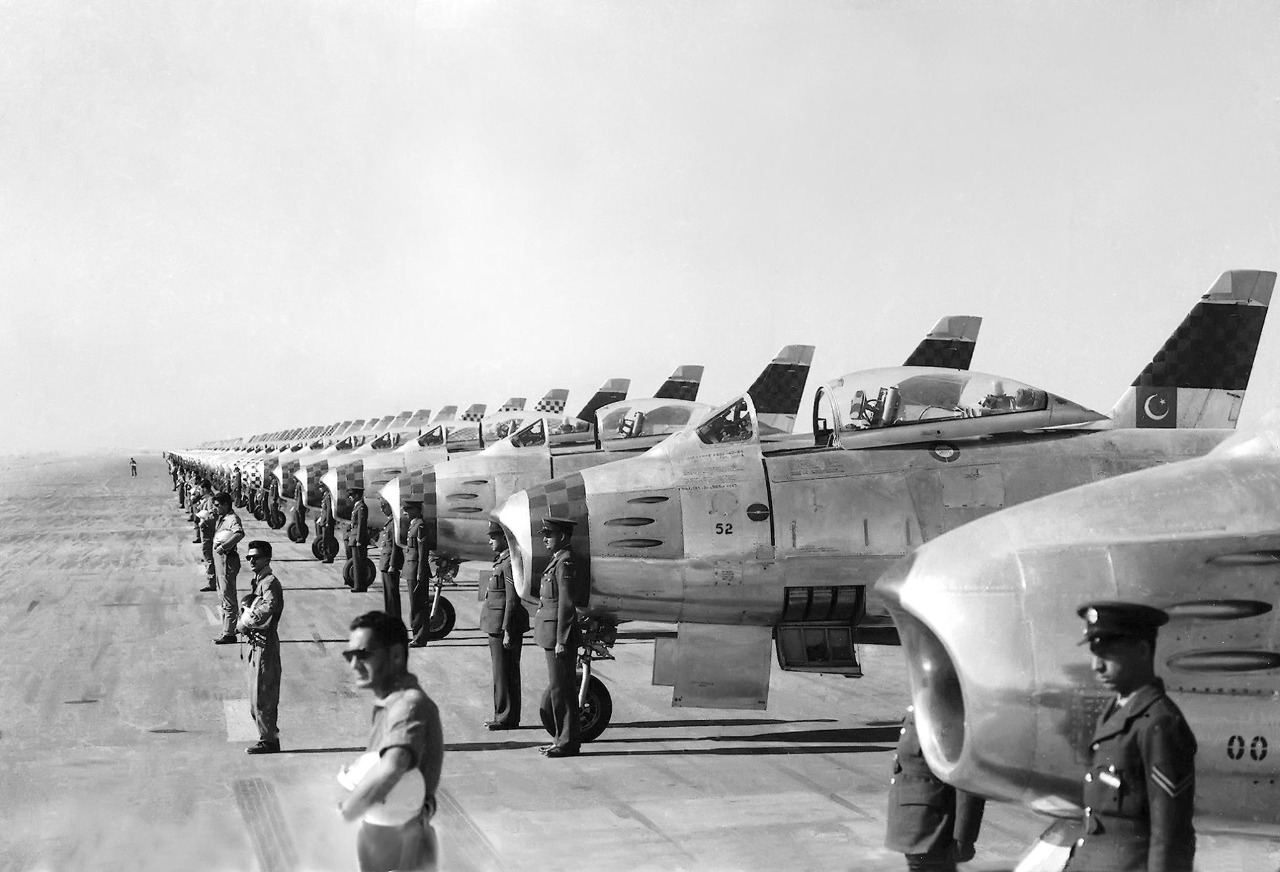
Pakistani F-86 Sabres lined up at Masroor Base during a ceremony.

In 1957 the Pakistan Air Force received 100 American-built F-86F-30NA Sabre and later F-86F-40-NA under the U.S. aid programme. Squadron after squadron in the PAF retired its Hawker Furys and Supermarine Attackers, and replaced them with F-86 jet fighters. In 1957 thirty-six-year-old Air Marshal Asghar Khan became the Pakistan Air Force's first native commander-in-chief.

== 1965 Indo-Pakistan War ==
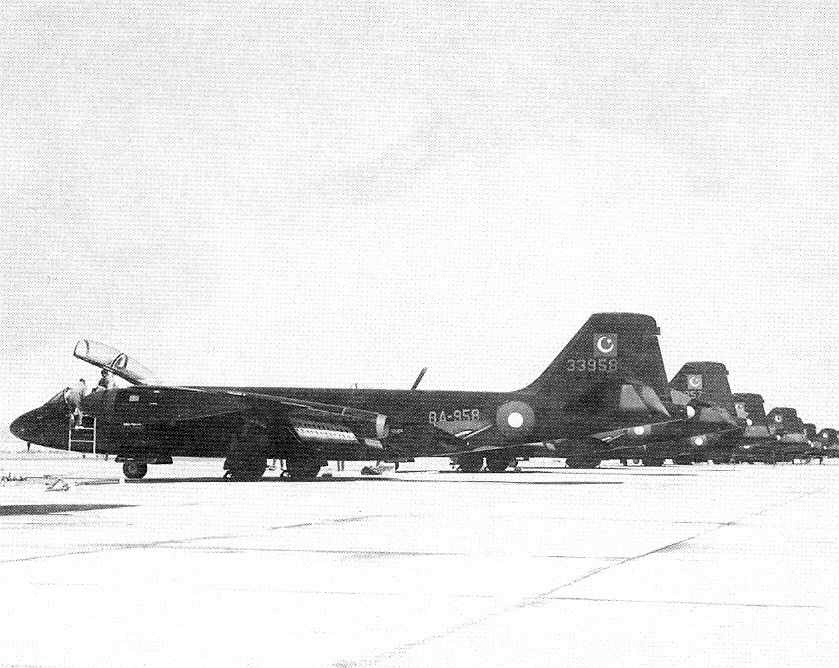
PAF B-57 Canberra bombers lined up at an airbase.

In the 1965 War the PAF fleet consisted of twelve F-104 Starfighters, some 120 F-86F Sabres and CL-13B Sabre Mk.6, 21 T-33A T-Bird Trainer and 28 B-57B Canberra bombers. The PAF claimed to have had complete air superiority over the battle area from the second day of operations. While Air Chief Marshal Arjan Singh of the Indian Air Force claimed, despite being qualitatively inferior, that the IAF achieved air superiority within three days.

Many publications have credited the PAF's successes to U.S. equipment, claiming it to be superior to the aircraft operated by the IAF and giving the PAF a "qualitative advantage". However some people refute this argument. As per them, the IAF's Mikoyan-Gurevich MiG-21FL, Hawker Hunter FGA.56A and Folland Fo.141 Gnat F.1 aircraft had better performance than the PAF's F-86F fighters. According to Air Cdre (retired) Sajad Haider, the F-86F Sabre was inferior in both power and speed to the IAF's Hawker Hunter FGA.56A.

According to Sajad Haider who flew with No. 19 Squadron, the F-104A Starfighter did not deserve its reputation as "the pride of the PAF" because it "was unsuited to the tactical environment of the region. It was a high-level interceptor designed to neutralize Soviet strategic bombers in altitudes above 40,000 feet." According to Indian sources, the F-86F performed reasonably well against the IAF Hawker Hunter FGA.56A but not as well against the Folland Fo.141 Gnat F.1, which was nicknamed Sabre Slayer by the IAF.

According to Indian sources most aircraft losses of IAF were on ground while PAF lost most in aerial combat. Even though the IAF flew a larger offensive air campaign by devoting 40% of its air effort to offensive air support alone, according to Indian sources the majority of its losses came from aircraft destroyed on the ground through PAF air strikes. The PAF without doubt, had achieved far more in terms of enemy aircraft destroyed on the ground but the IAF had achieved much more in the close support role.

The two countries have made contradictory claims of combat losses during the war and few neutral sources have verified the claims of either country. The PAF claimed it shot down 104 IAF planes and lost 19 of its own, while the IAF claimed it shot down 73 PAF planes and lost 59. Despite the intense fighting, the conflict was effectively a stalemate.

=== Post-war sanctions and acquisitions ===
After the 1965 war the U.S. placed an arms embargo on Pakistan and the PAF was badly affected. Its entire fleet was of U.S. origin and spare parts could not be sourced from the United States. In 1967, the U.S. did allow for the sale of spare parts for previously provided equipment.

The PAF began searching for new combat aircraft. China was approached and agreed to supply an initial 72 Shenyang F-6C fighter. These entered into service on 30 December 1965. China also supplied a squadron of Harbin B-5 bombers, but the PAF was not satisfied with them due to their lack of a modern bomb aiming system. These were later returned to China in exchange for more F-6C fighter jets.

In 1968, the PAF's No. 5 Squadron started the procurement of the Dassault Mirage IIIEP due to the limited range of the F-6C. The Mirage III thus became the PAF's main offensive aircraft. Even still, the Mirage was not equipped with modern munitions such as anti-runway bombs for attacking airbases, cluster bombs for attacking armoured formations or anti-ship weapons because such weapons could not be sourced from the U.S. or Europe. The Mirage was also restricted by the lack of equipment such as bomb pylons and missile launchers, which meant the Mirage III fleet was limited in terms of weapon configurations.

== 1971 Bangladesh Liberation War and Indo-Pakistan War ==
By late 1971, the intensification of the independence movement in erstwhile East Pakistan led to the Bangladesh Liberation War between India and Pakistan. On 22 November 1971, ten days before the start of a full-scale war, four PAF F-86 Sabre jets attacked Indian and Mukti Bahini positions at Garibpur, near the international border. Two of the four PAF Sabres were shot down and one damaged by the IAF's Folland Gnats. On 3 December, India formally declared war against Pakistan following massive preemptive strikes by the PAF against Indian Air Force installations in Srinagar, Ambala, Sirsa, Halwara and Jodhpur. However, the IAF did not suffer significantly because the leadership had anticipated such a move and precautions were taken. The Indian Air Force was quick to respond to Pakistani air strikes, following which the PAF carried out mostly defensive sorties.

Within the first two weeks, the IAF had carried out almost 12,000 sorties over East Pakistan and also provided close air support to the advancing Indian Army. IAF also assisted the Indian Navy in its operations against the Pakistani Navy in the Bay of Bengal and Arabian Sea. On the western front, the IAF destroyed more than 20 Pakistani tanks, 4 APCs and a supply train during the Battle of Longewala. The IAF undertook strategic bombing of West Pakistan by carrying out raids on oil installations in Karachi, the Mangla Dam and a gas plant in Sindh. Similar strategy was also deployed in East Pakistan and as the IAF achieved complete air superiority on the eastern front, the ordnance factories, runways, and other vital areas of East Pakistan were severely damaged. The IAF was able to conduct a wide range of missions – troop support; air combat; deep penetration strikes; para-dropping behind enemy lines; feints to draw enemy fighters away from the actual target; bombing; and reconnaissance. Hostilities officially ended at 14:30 GMT on 17 December, after the fall of Dacca on 15 December. Despite strategic loss of Pakistan on eastern front, PAF maintained its qualitative edge and dominated the sky during the war and according to declassified CIA document about 71 IAF aircraft were lost while, Pakistan lost 43 aircraft during war. But the imbalance in air losses was explained by the IAF's considerably higher sortie rate, and its emphasis on ground-attack missions. On the ground Pakistan suffered the most, with 9,000 killed and 25,000 wounded while India lost 3,000 dead and 12,000 wounded. The loss of armoured vehicles was similarly imbalanced. This represented a major defeat for Pakistan. Towards the end of the war, IAF's transport planes dropped leaflets over Dhaka urging the Pakistani forces to surrender, demoralising Pakistani troops in East Pakistan. According to some spectators 1971 war was more of a political defeat for Pakistan rather military.

== 1972–1979 ==
In 1979, the PAF's Chief of Air Staff, Air Chief Marshal Anwar Shamim, was told by then President, and Chief of Army Staff General Zia ul Haq that Pakistan had reliable information of Indian plans to attack and destroy the Pakistani nuclear research facilities at Kahuta. ACM Shamim told General Zia that Indian aircraft could reach the area in 3 minutes whereas the PAF would take 8 minutes, allowing the Indians to attack the facility and return before the PAF could defend it. Because Kahuta was too close to the Indian border to be effectively defended it was decided that the best way to deter an Indian attack would be to procure new advanced fighters and weaponry. These would be used to mount a retaliatory attack on India's nuclear research facilities at Trombay in the event of an Indian attack on Kahuta. It was decided the most suitable aircraft would be the F-16, which the United States eventually agreed to supply after the PAF refused to buy the F-5E and F-5G. In 1983, when the first batch of F-16s reached Pakistan, ACM Shamim informed Zia of the PAF's capability to respond to an attack on the nuclear research facilities at Kahuta.

== 1979–1988: Soviet–Afghan War ==
The Soviet invasion of Afghanistan in 1979 in support of the pro-Soviet government in Kabul, which was being hard-pressed by Mujahadeen rebel forces, marked the start of a decade-long occupation. Mujahadeen rebels continued to harass the occupying Soviet military force as well as the forces of the Afghan regime that it was supporting. The war soon spilled over into neighbouring Pakistan, with a horde of refugees fleeing to camps across the border in an attempt to escape the conflict. In addition, many of the rebels used Pakistan as a sanctuary from which to carry out forays into Afghanistan, and a steady flow of US-supplied arms was carried into Afghanistan from staging areas in Pakistan near the border. This inevitably resulted in border violations by Soviet and Afghan aircraft attempting to interdict these operations.

The PAF is believed to have evaluated the Dassault Mirage 2000E in early 1981 and was planning to evaluate the General Dynamics F-16 Fighting Falcon afterwards.

A letter of agreement for up to 28 F-16A and 12 F-16B was signed December 1981. The contracts, Peace Gate I and Peace Gate II, were for 6 and 34 Block 15 models respectively which would be powered by the F100-PW-200 engine. The first Peace Gate I aircraft was accepted at Fort Worth in October 1982. Two F-16A and four F-16B were delivered to Pakistan in 1983, the first F-16 arriving at PAF Base Sargodha (now known as PAF Base Mushaf) on 15 January 1983 flown by Squadron Leader Shahid Javed. The 34 remaining Peace Gate II aircraft were delivered between 1983 and 1987. Six F-16A and four F-16B Block 15 OCU models were ordered as attrition replacements in December 1988 under the Peace Gate III contract. Another 60 F-16A/B were ordered in September 1989 under Peace Gate IV. These were later embargoed.

Between May 1986 and November 1988, PAF F-16s have shot down at least eight intruders from Afghanistan. The first three of these (one Su-22M4, one probable Su-22M4, and one An-26B) were shot down by two pilots from No. 9 Squadron. Pilots of No. 14 Squadron destroyed the remaining five intruders (two Su-22s, two MiG-23s, and one Su-25). Most of these kills were by the AIM-9 Sidewinder, but at least one (a Su-22) was destroyed by cannon fire. Flight Lieutenant Khalid Mahmood is credited with three of these kills. One F-16 was lost in these battles during an encounter between two F-16s and six Afghan Air Force aircraft on 29 April 1987, stated by the PAF to have been an "own-goal" because it was hit by an AIM-9L Sidewinder fired from the other F-16. The pilot, Flight Lieutenant Shahid Sikandar Khan, ejected safely. Most of these air kills were achieved within Pakistani borders. No.9 Sqn was credited with 3 kills, where as No.14 Sqn was credited with 5 kills. One of the PAF's kills included Alexander Rutskoy who was shot down on 8 August on Su-25 Frogfoot.

Project Sabre II was initiated by the PAF in 1987 and was aimed at developing a replacement for the ageing Shenyang F-6C and MiG-19S fleet. After a design study by Grumman Aerospace determined it would be financially risky, it was abandoned by PAF and the Chengdu F-7P was introduced in 1988 to replace the F-6C.

== 1989–2001: sanctions and the 'lost decade' ==
The Pressler Amendment passed by the US Congress, in 1985, prevented the sale of arms equipment to Pakistan unless it could be verified that the goods would not be used to build or deliver nuclear weapons. Subsequently, the US also placed a broader embargo on Pakistan on 6 October 1990, due to the country's continued nuclear weapons programme.

As a stop-gap measure, it was decided to augment the PAF fleet with second-hand Mirage IIIE fighters. In April 1990, Pakistan signed a contract to purchase fifty used Mirage IIIO interceptors, which had recently been retired by the Royal Australian Air Force. While the initial asking price was more than A$100 million, the figure settled on and paid, including spare airframes and many other parts, was reportedly A$27 million. In November 1990 the partly-disassembled Mirages and spares were shipped by sea to Karachi and then transported on trailers to PAF Base Masroor. After some further dismantling they were flown by C-130E Hercules to the Aeronautical Complex at Kamra, where they were to undergo a full rebuild process. However, it was discovered that the ex-RAAF Mirages were generally in better condition than expected and some did not require a complete overhaul. Other variants of the Mirage III (mostly IIIE) and/or Mirage 5 were bought from Belgium, Spain, Lebanon and Libya. Parts and auxiliary equipment for the Mirages were acquired from countries including France and South Africa. From 1995, many of the Mirages were upgraded and standardised by the PAF under Project ROSE.

As a result of the Pressler Amendment, eleven Peace Gate III F-16s, along with seven F-16A and ten F-16B of the sixty Peace Gate IV aircraft, which had been built by the end of 1994 were embargoed and put into storage in the United States.

Desperate for a new high-tech combat aircraft, between late 1990 and 1993 the PAF evaluated the European Panavia PA-200 Tornado IDS GR.4 MRCA (multi-role combat aircraft) and rejected it. The Mirage 2000E and an offer from Poland for the supply of MiG-29A and Su-27P were also considered but nothing materialised. In 1992 the PAF again looked at the Mirage 2000, reviving a proposal from the early 1980s to procure around 20–40 aircraft, but again a sale did not occur because France did not want to sell a fully capable version due to political reasons. In August 1994 the PAF was offered the Saab JAS-39 Gripen by Sweden, but again the sale did not occur because 20% of the Gripen's components were from the U.S. and Pakistan was still under U.S. sanctions.

In mid-1992 Pakistan was close to signing a contract for the supply of forty Dassault Mirage 2000, equipped with Thomson-CSF RDM/7 radars, from France but the deal was never signed. In mid-1994 it was reported that the Russian manufacturers Sukhoi and Mikoyan were offering the Su-27 and MiG-29. But Pakistan was later reported to be negotiating for supply of the Dassault Mirage 2000-5. French and Russian teams visited Pakistan on 27 November 1994 and it was speculated that interest in the Russian aircraft was to pressure France into reducing the price of the Mirage 2000. Stated requirement was for up to 40 aircraft.

In 1996 it was reported that Pakistan was negotiating a $160 million contract for missiles with South Africa, believed to be for the Kentron (now Denel) U-Darter imaging-infra-red short range air-to-air missile.

=== 1999 Kargil Conflict ===
The Pakistan Air Force (PAF) did not see active combat during the low-intensity Kargil Conflict between India and Pakistan during the summer of 1999 but remained on high air defence alert (ADA) and performed F-16 and F-7MP combat air patrols (CAPs) near the eastern border with India. The PAF closely monitored and tracked the IAF's movements near the Line of Control in Kashmir as well as the India-Pakistan international border.

== 2019 India–Pakistan border skirmishes ==
=== Operation Swift Retort ===
In 2019, during rising tensions, Indian warplanes conducted a bombing raid on a alleged terrorist camp in Balakot. Open source satellites imagery had revealed that no targets of consequence were hit. In response Pakistan Air Force launched "Operation Swift Retort" and conducted six airstrikes at non-military targets in Indian-administered Jammu and Kashmir.

=== Aerial engagements ===
On 27 February 2019, a PAF F-16 shot down an Indian MiG-21 which was chasing a PAF strike package returning from its mission. The pilot of the Mig-21, WC Abhinandan Varthaman ejected and was captured by Pakistan Army. ISPR, Maj Gen. Asif Ghafoor stated that two Indian aircraft, a Su-30MKI and a MiG-21 (above mentioned) were shot down by the Pakistan Air Force, according to ISPR, the Su-30MKI crashed inside Indian territory. Indian officials acknowledged the loss of the MiG-21, but rejected the loss of the Su-30MKI. They further stated that a PAF F-16 was shot down, however Pakistani officials rejected this claim.

== 2025 India–Pakistan conflict ==
=== Aerial engagements ===
On 7 May 2025, India launched missile and air strikes on nine alleged "militant camps" in both Pakistan and Pakistan-administered Kashmir. These Indian air strikes triggered an aerial battle in which more than 114 aircraft, 72 from the IAF and 42 from the PAF, were involved in what was described as the largest beyond visual range engagement on the India–Pakistan border, the engagement was also described as one of the largest air battles since the end of World War II.

According to independent assessments, Pakistan Air Force Chengdu J-10Cs shot down at least five to six Indian fighter aircraft, including three Rafales, one MiG-29, one SU-30MKI and a Heron unmanned aerial vehicle. This would mark the first aerial kills achieved by the J-10s and by doing so with the PL-15 BVRM, marking the first combat use of the missile.

=== Operation Bunyan-um-Marsoos ===
Shortly after the Indian missile strikes, Pakistan launched a retaliatory operation, codenamed "Operation Bunyan-um-Marsoos". PAF claimed that it has struck and caused major damage to 26 military targets in India, including 15 air bases of Suratgarh, Sirsa, Naliya, Adampur, Bhatinda, Barnala, Halwara, Awantipur, Srinagar, Jammu, Udhampur, Mamoon, Ambala and Pathankot. It was further stated that the BrahMos storage facilities at Beas and Nagrota were destroyed, and that two S-400 systems at Adampur and Bhuj were successfully neutralized by the Pakistan Air Force. Ukrainian Intelligence also confirmed the neutralization of a cheeseboard radar from S-400 systems. Indian Prime Minister Narendra Modi visited Adampur air base and appeared in front of one of the S-400 air defense system’s launchers. In doing so, he arguably confirmed the damage to components of the system more than he denied it. This is because Pakistan had struck a radar, not a launcher, of which there can be up to 12 units in a single regiment.

=== Counter-insurgency operations ===
The Pakistan Army faced several problems during its 2009 offensive against the Taliban in north-west Pakistan. Hundreds of thousands of Pakistanis fled the area when the offensive was announced and, eventually, over 2 million had to be accommodated in refugee camps. The offensive was to be completed as quickly as possible to allow the refugees to return to their homes but the army's fleet attack helicopters were not sufficient to provide adequate support to the infantry. The PAF was sent into action against the Taliban to make up for the lack of helicopter gunships. Because the PAF was trained and equipped to fight a conventional war, a new "counter-terrorist doctrine" had to be improvised.

The PAF's Saffron Bandit 2009/2010 exercise focused on extensive training of combat personnel to undertake COIN operations. New equipment was inducted to improve the PAF's joint intelligence, surveillance and reconnaissance (ISR) capabilities. A C-130 transport aircraft was indigenously modified for day/night ISR operations.

The PAF had been forced to use Google Earth for reconnaissance imagery until high resolution infra-red sensors were provided by the U.S. prior to the army's 2009 campaign in the Swat valley. These were installed on around 10 of the PAF's F-16 fighters and used to gather detailed reconnaissance imagery of the entire valley. Use of laser-guided bombs was increased to 80% of munitions used, as compared to 40% in the previous 2008 Bajaur campaign. A small corps of ground spotters were trained and used by the PAF, in addition to PA spotters, to identify high-value targets.

Prior to the PA's offensive into South Waziristan the PAF attacked militant infrastructure with 500 lb and 2000 lb bombs.

After the Mumbai attacks and threats made by India PAF was put on high alert. Pakistani press reported an outstanding order to launch a counterattack in case of an air attack from India after Indian Foreign Minister Pranab Mukharjee threatened Pakistani President in rough tone. On the morning of 14 December Indian aircraft started moving towards Pakistan, PAF moved swiftly and intercepted them before they entered international borders. Two of the aircraft did cross the border but Indian aircraft managed to turn back. PAF was ordered to carry on the defensive combat patrols but avoid hostile action unless further hostile action was to take place.

A number of civilian deaths occurred during PAF air strikes on 10 April 2010 in the Khyber tribal region. According to a Pakistani military source, the first bombing was targeted at a gathering of militants in a compound. Local people, who had quickly moved onto the scene to recover the dead and wounded, were then killed during a second air strike. There was no confirmed death toll but at least 30 civilian deaths had occurred according to the military source, whereas a local official stated at least 73 locals, including women and children, were killed. A six-member committee of tribal elders from the area, tasked with finding the exact number of civilian casualties, reported that 61 civilians were killed and 21 wounded. This was not confirmed by military or political leaders but Pakistan's Chief of Army Staff, General Ashfaq Kayani, gave a public apology on 17 April. It is reported that BBC News and several other media correspondences were not allowed to take interviews from injured which makes the whole episode more mysterious.

On 22 May 2011 it was reported that the PAF had retaliated against attacks by Afghan mortar and machine gun positions on the Pakistani posts at Miskinai and Sangpura in the Bajaur area. It was stated that since 19 May, around 1000 Afghan Askaris had entered the Bajaur area at Sahi as well as Miskinai and Sankpura. The Afghan forces had been firing at the posts during night and, after reconnaissance sorties, PAF aircraft destroyed the Afghan positions.

On 4 November 2023, nine militants from the Tehreek-e-Jihad Pakistan attacked the Mianwali Training Air base in Punjab Province, damaging three aircraft on the ground before being killed by PAF personnel.

=== Modernisation and acquisitions ===
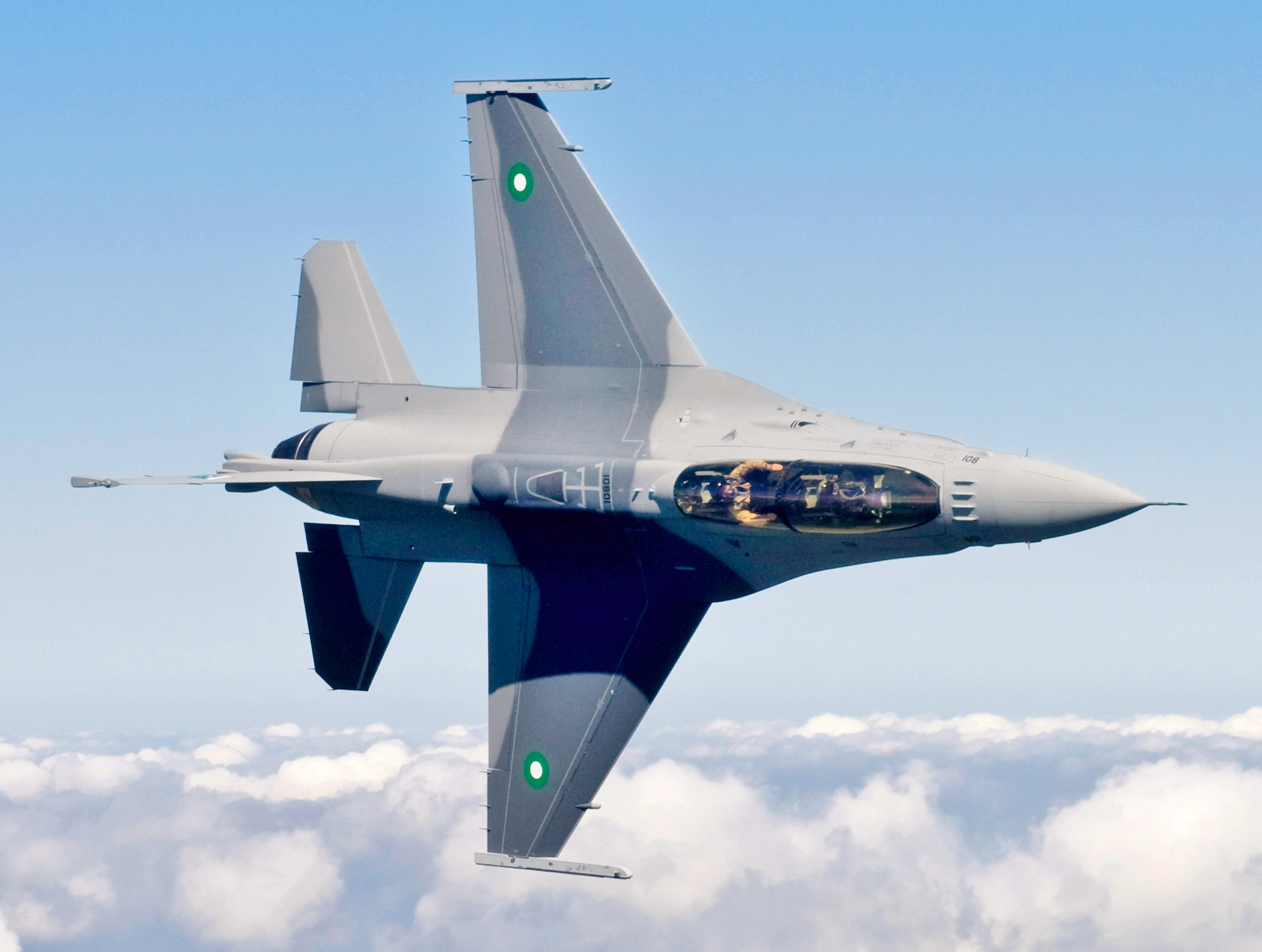
The first of the PAF's new F-16D Block 52+ fighters, rolled out on 13 October 2009, undergoing flight testing in the U.S. prior to delivery.

In light of Pakistan's significant contribution to the war on terror, the United States and Western European countries, namely Germany and France, lifted their defense related sanctions on Pakistan; enabling the country to once again seek advanced Western military hardware. Since the lifting of sanctions, the Pakistan Air Force (PAF) became heavily active in evaluating potential military hardware such as new fighter aircraft, radars and land based air-defense systems. However the urgent relief needed in Kashmir after the 2005 Kashmir earthquake forced the Pakistani military to stall its modernisation programme so it could divert its resources for fuel and operations during the rescue efforts.

The modernisation stall would end in April 2006 when the Pakistani cabinet approved the PAF's proposals to procure new aircraft and systems from several sources, including modern combat aircraft from the U.S. and China. The AFFDP 2019 (Armed Forces Development Programme 2019) would oversee the modernisation of the Pakistan Air Force from 2006 to 2019.

The Bush administration on 24 July 2008 informed the US Congress it plans to shift nearly $230 million of $300 million in aid from counterterrorism programs to upgrading Pakistan's aging F-16s. The Bush administration previously announced on 27 June 2008 it was proposing to sell Pakistan ITT Corporation's electronic warfare gear valued at up to $75 million to enhance Islamabad's existing F-16s. Pakistan has asked about buying as many as 21 AN/ALQ-211(V)9 Advanced Integrated Defensive Electronic Warfare Suite pods, or AIDEWS, and related equipment. The proposed sale will ensure that the existing fleet is "compatible" with new F-16 Block 50/52 fighters being purchased by Islamabad.

After the September 11 attacks in 2001, the U.S. and Pakistan began discussing the release of the embargoed F-16s and a purchase of new aircraft. Of the 28 F-16A/B built under the Peace Gate III/IV contracts and embargoed in 1990, 14 delivered as EDA (Excess Defense Articles) from 2005 to 2008, two of which were delivered on 10 July 2007.

Between 2005 and 2008, 14 F-16A/B Block 15 OCU fighters were delivered to the PAF under renewed post-9/11 ties between the U.S. and Pakistan. These had originally been built for Pakistan under the Peace Gate III/IV contracts but were never delivered due to the U.S. arms embargo imposed in 1990.

To upgrade the F-16A/B fleet, 32 Falcon STAR kits were purchased for the original Peace Gate I aircraft and 35 Mid-Life Update (MLU) kits were ordered, with an option for 11 more MLU kits. Four F-16A/B were upgraded in the U.S. to F-16AM/BM, with delivery expected in December 2011. F-16A/B in PAF service were to be upgraded, starting October 2010, by Turkish Aerospace Industries, 1 per month.

The Peace Drive I contract for twelve F-16C and six F-16D Block 52+ (Advanced Block 52) aircraft, powered by F100-PW-229 engines was signed on 30 September 2006. The first F-16 to be completed, an F-16D, was rolled out on 13 October 2009 and began flight testing. The first batch of F-16C/D Block 52+, two F-16D and one F-16C, landed at PAF Base Shahbaz, Jacobabad, on 26 June 2010 and one more F-16C was received by 5 July 2010.

On 19 May 2006 the PAF inaugurated a refurbished Sector Operations Centre at PAF Base Mushaf (Sargodha) which had been installed with a Pakistani-developed air defence automation system for command and control. An old air defence system installed in the 1980s was replaced.

External videos
- A speech by then Chief of Air Staff, ACM Tanvir Mehmood Ahmad, at the TPS-77 radar induction ceremony in April 2008.

The TPS-77 radar was introduced into service in April 2008.

During talks with a delegation from the French Senate on Monday 28 September 2009, Prime Minister Yousuf Raza Gilani stated that the PAF had used most of its stockpile of laser-guided munitions against militants in the Malakand and FATA regions and that replacements for such types of equipment were urgently required.

In December 2009 the PAF's first Saab 2000 Erieye AEW&C was delivered from Sweden and Il-78MP Midas aerial refuelling tanker/military transport aircraft from Ukraine.

The PAF is reported to be considering purchasing the Hongdu L-15 advanced jet trainer to train pilots for high-tech fighters such as the J-10. Extensive evaluations of the aircraft took place in Pakistan during December 2009.

On 26 June 2010 the first batch of 3 F-16C/D Block 52+ fighters were delivered to PAF Base Shahbaz, Jacobabad. According to Air Chief Marshal Rao Qamar Suleman the new fighters would eliminate the PAF's limitations in precision night-time strike operations, the existing capability being based on around 34 Dassault Mirage 5 fighters upgraded with new avionics for night-time precision strike missions under the Retrofit of Strike Element (ROSE) programme during 1999–2004.

It was reported in 2010 that the R-Darter, an active radar homing beyond visual range air-to-air missile, is being operated by the Pakistan Air Force.

In January 2024, Pakistan Air Force (PAF) chief Zaheer Sidhu announced Pakistan's intention to buy Shenyang J-35 aircraft, and preparations were made for the acquisition. In December 2024, Pakistani media reported that the PAF approved the purchase of 40 aircraft.

On 6 June 2025, Pakistan's government officially announced the country's plan to acquire the KJ-500 for the Pakistan Air Force.

=== Introduction of female engineers and pilots ===
Previously, women had been employed by Pakistan's armed forces in non-combat roles only, such as the medical corps, and the PAF had remained all-male throughout its history. However, in 2003 women were allowed to enroll in the aerospace engineering and other programs of PAF Academy Risalpur, including fighter pilot training programmes. It was stated that standards would not be compromised for women and those who did not achieve the same performance as their male counterparts would be dropped from the course. A level of segregation between the genders is maintained. For example, early-morning parades are performed together but some parts of training, mainly physical exercises, are done with males and females separated. According to Squadron Leader Shazia Ahmed, the officer in charge of the first female cadets and a psychologist, this also improves confidence of the women.

In 2005 it was reported that two batches in the Air Force Academy's flying wing contained 10 women, with many more in the engineering and aerospace wings. Cadet Saba Khan, from Quetta in Balochistan, applied after reading a newspaper advertisement seeking female cadets. She was one of the first four women to pass the first stages of flying training on propeller-driven light aircraft and move onto faster jet-powered training aircraft.

In March 2006, the PAF inducted a batch of 34 fighter pilots which included the organisation's first four female fighter pilots. Three years of training had been completed by the pilots at PAF Academy Risalpur before they graduated and were awarded their Flying Badges during the ceremony. Certificates of honour were handed to the successful cadets by a "delighted" General Ahsan Saleem Hayat, vice chief of the Pakistan Army, who acknowledged that the PAF was the first of the Pakistani armed forces to introduce women to its combat units. One of the women, Flying Officer Nadia Gul, was awarded a trophy for best academic achievement. The other female graduates were Mariam Khalil, Saira Batool and the above-mentioned Saba Khan. A second batch of pilots, including three female pilots, graduated from the 117th GD (P) course at PAF Academy Risalpur in September 2006. The Sword of Honour for best all-round performance was awarded to Aviation Cadet Saira Amin, the first female pilot to win the award. Aviation Cadet Saira Amin won the Asghar Hussain Trophy for best performance in academics.

External videos
- A news report on the PAF's first operationally qualified female fighter pilots.
- An interview with Ambreen Gul. (in Urdu)

In September 2009 it was reported that seven women had qualified as operational fighter pilots on the Chengdu F-7, the first female combat pilots in the PAF's history, one of them being Ambreen Gull. Commanding Officer Tanvir Piracha emphasised that if the female pilots "are not good enough as per their male counterparts, we don't let them fly." It was noted that some of the female pilots wear the hijab while others do not.

=== Exercises ===
In September 2004 a PAF contingent of six F-16A/B arrived in Turkey to take part in the international Anatolian Eagle 2004 exercise. As well as the Turkish Air Force, the air forces of Germany, the Netherlands, Italy and the United States also participated.

After around a year of planning, in 2005 the PAF launched the High Mark 2005 exercise which lasted for one month and also involved the Pakistan Army and Pakistan Navy. In the scenario, two opposing forces, Blueland and Foxland, engaged in simulated combat involving both offensive and defensive operations. All of the PAF's resources, including aircraft, avionics, weapons systems and ground-based radars were involved. It was stated that the exercise would have three stages and PAF aircraft would fly 8200 sorties. The exercise would take place right across Pakistan, from the northern areas of Skardu and Gilgit to the central and southern areas including the Arabian Sea. The exercise was designed to validate the PAF's operational concepts and would be used to further improve the PAF's training regimes and future force employment concepts. The PAF's F-16 fighters would fly in offensive and defensive air superiority roles, with F-7P/PG providing air defence. The Mirage 3/5 was to be used in the strike role and the A-5C would provide air support to the army units involved. Involvement of army and navy units was aimed at providing more realistic operational scenarios. High Mark 2005 followed the Tempest-1 exercise which was focused purely on air power but differed in terms of duration, intensity and complexity of air operations.

A PAF contingent of six F-16A/B fighters was sent to the international Anatolian Eagle 2006 exercise, which also involved the U.S. and Israeli as well as the Turkish air forces. Operation Indus Viper 2008, a joint exercise involving PAF and the Turkish Air Force, began on 21 April 2008 at PAF Base Mushaf (Sargodha) and was scheduled to last 10 days. Five Turkish F-16C/D fighters and 50 personnel of 191 Kobras Filo (191 Cobras Squadron) attended.

In the summer of 2005 a PAF team of 20 airmen, including pilots, navigators, engineers, maintenance technicians and a C-130E was sent to the U.S. to take part in the AMC (Air Mobility Command) Rodeo. The team, led by Wing Commander Akbar Shoaib, was expected to score well in the paratrooping, spot landing and short-field landing events. The PAF later took part in the July 2007 AMC Rodeo.

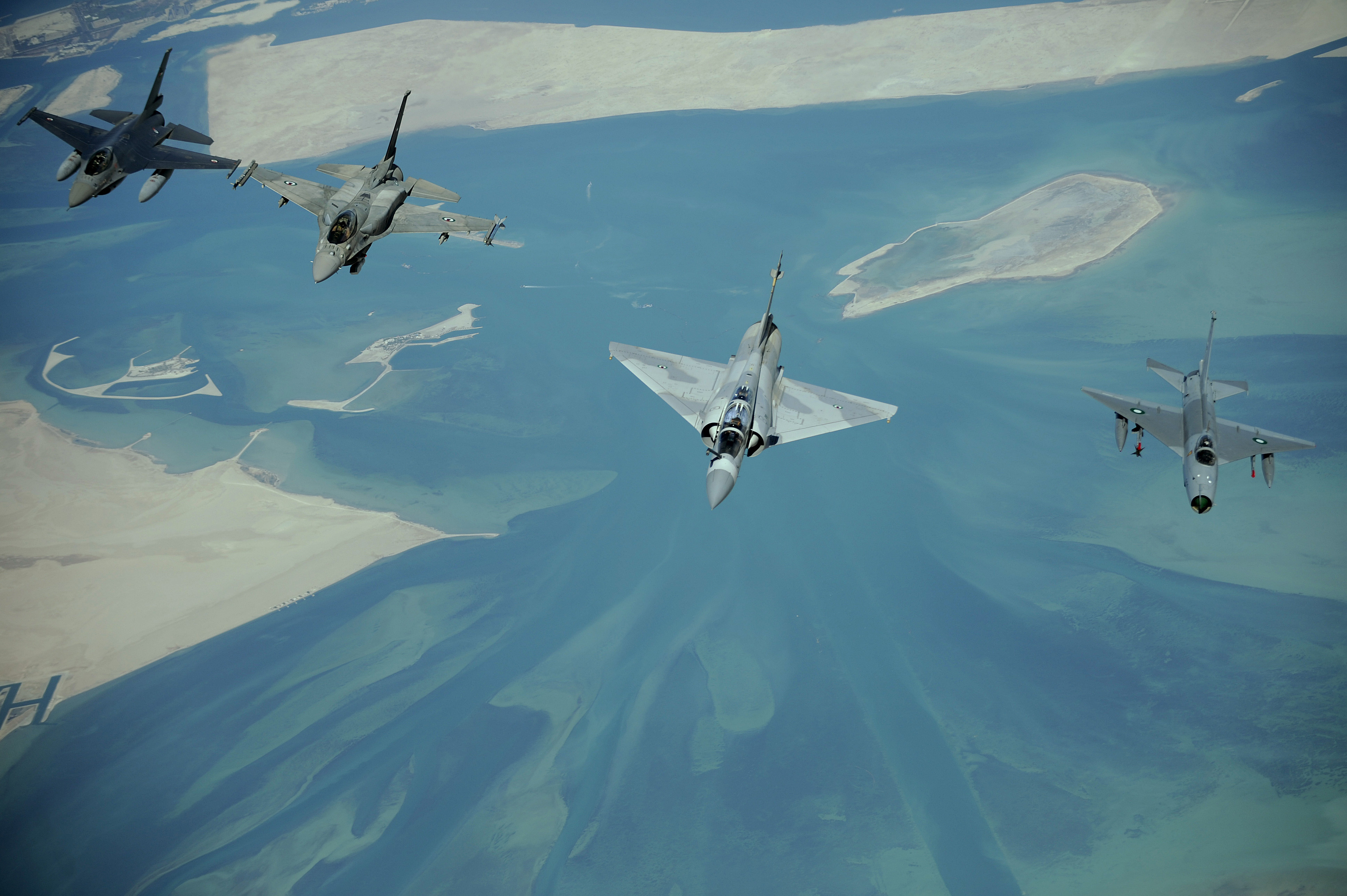
A PAF F-7PG flies alongside a Mirage 2000-9 and F-16E/F Block 60 fighters of the UAEAF during ATLC 2009.

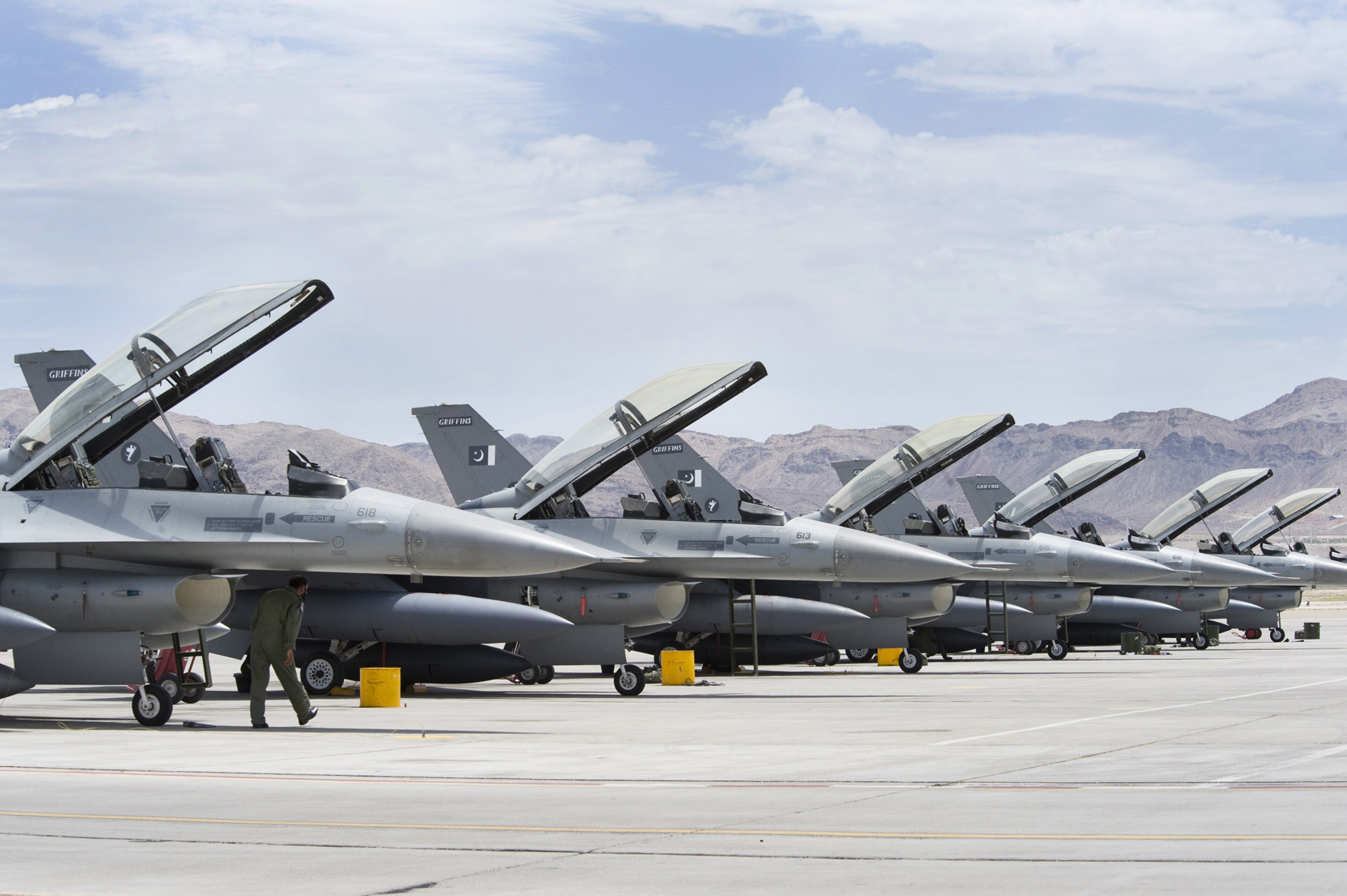
PAF F-16s arrive at Red Flag 2010 in Nevada.

A PAF Mirage III of No. 7 Bandits Squadron alongside a US Navy F-18 and F-16s of the USAF and RJAF.

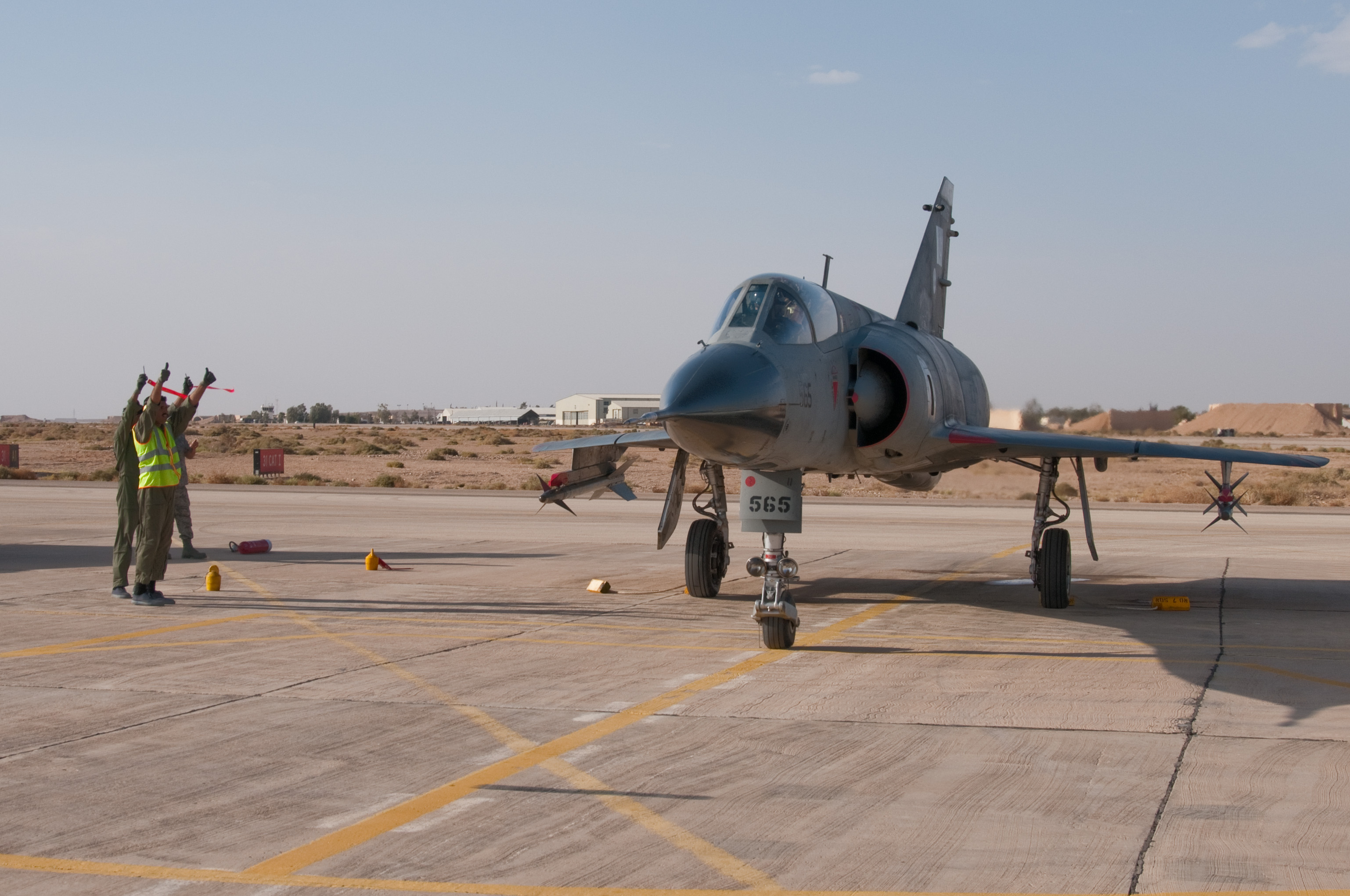
A PAF Mirage III competes in the Alert Scramble Competition during Falcon Air Meet 2010 in Jordan.

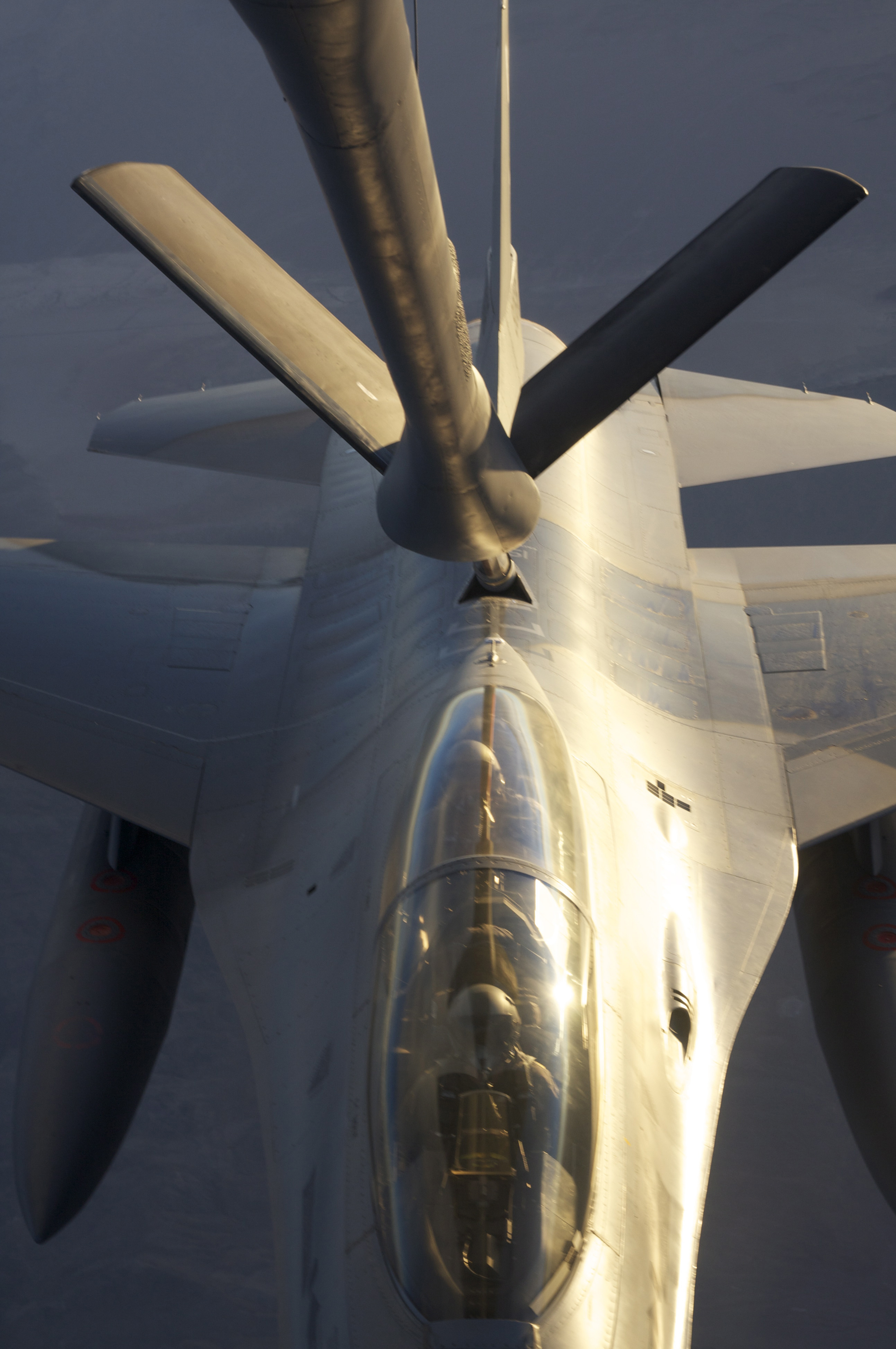
A PAF F-16 is refuelled in-flight by a USAF KC-135 tanker during Red Flag 2010.

External videos
- Mirage III ROSE fighters of the PAF's No. 7 Bandits Squadron take part in the Falcon Air Meet 2010 exercise.

In 2009, while undertaking combat operations against militants in FATA and Swat, the PAF initiated the Saffron Bandit exercise with the aim of training the PAF's entire combat force to undertake such anti-terrorist operations.

In December 2009 the PAF sent six Chengdu F-7PG fighters, of No. 31 Wing based at PAF Base Samungli, to the United Arab Emirates to take part in the Air Tactics Leadership Course (ATLC) at Al Dhafra Air Base. Al Dhafra Air Base hosts Dassault Mirage 2000-9 and F-16E/F Block 60 fighters of the UAEAF. Also participating were six F-16s of the Jordanian No. 1 Squadron, six Dassault Rafales of the AdlA, six Eurofighter Typhoons of the Royal Air Force No. 3 Squadron and six F-16CJ Block 52 fighters of the USAF 169th Fighter Wing. Six F-22A fighters of the USAF 1st Fighter Wing also flew training sorties with some of the air forces at Al Dhafra but did not take part in the main exercise. The U.S. units called the exercise Operation Iron Falcon. Most of the participants took turns flying as Red Air and were described by a USAF F-16 pilot as being "very competent" and posing "significant tactical problems to solve."

The PAF's High Mark 2010 exercise was launched on 15 March 2010, the first time a High Mark exercise had been conducted since 2005, after all PAF received their Air Tasking Orders (ATO). The country-wide exercise involved units based all over Pakistan, from Skardu to the Arabian Sea, at all Main Operating Bases and Forward Operating Bases. Joint operations involving the Pakistan Army and Pakistan Navy were also conducted, aiming to test and improve integration and cooperation between the three arms. Operations emphasised a near-realistic simulation of the war-time environment, exposure of PAF aircrews to contemporary concepts of air combat, new employment concepts and joint operations between air force, army and navy. New inductions such as the JF-17 Thunder fighter, Saab 2000 Erieye AEW&C and Il-78 Multi-Role Tanker Transports also took part.

On 6 April 2010 the end of the first phase of exercise High Mark 2010 was celebrated with a firepower demonstration at the PAF's firing range facility in the deserts of Thal. The 90-minute demo began with a sonic boom from a Mirage fighter flying past at supersonic speed, followed by various PAF combat aircraft attacking targets with a wide range of live weaponry. The newly inducted JF-17 Thunder was shown hitting targets with bombs and the new Saab 2000 Erieye AEW&C and Il-78 MRTT were also displayed to the public for the first time during the demo. The Il-78 performed an in-flight refuelling operation with two Mirage fighters. The H-2 SOW (Stand-Off Weapon) was also shown to the public for the first time, being launched from around 60 km away before hitting its target. The demo also involved a mock counter-insurgency operation with troops raiding a compound, a search-and-relief operation, an air-drop of heavy equipment by transport planes and the use of unmanned aerial vehicles. The demo heralded the beginning of High Mark 2010s second phase where the PAF would practice joint operations with the Pakistan Army during the army's exercise Azm-e-Nau-3 (New Resolve 3).

During High Mark 2010 a Chengdu F-7 and Mirage 5 fighter (flown by Squadron Leader Nadeem Iqbal and Wing Commander Syed Ata ur Rehman respectively) practised landing, refuelling and take-off operations from a Pakistani motorway. It was reported that the PAF is in negotiations with the Ministry of Communications to set up all required facilities for Air Force operations on the motorways and highways of Pakistan.

In July 2010 the PAF sent six F-16B fighters of No. 9 Griffins Squadron and 100 PAF personnel to Nellis Air Force Base in the U.S. to participate in the international Red Flag exercise for the first time. During the exercise the PAF pilots practised in-flight refuelling of their F-16s with the Boeing KC-135 Stratotanker.

In October 2010 the PAF's No. 7 Bandits Squadron sent a team of its Dassault Mirage III ROSE fighters to Jordan to participate in the Falcon Air Meet 2010 exercise. The event took place at Azraq Royal Jordanian Air Base and involved teams from the U.S. Air Force, U.S. Navy and the United Arab Emirates as well as the Royal Jordanian Air Force.

In January 2011 a PAF contingent of F-16A/B and Dassault Mirage fighters took part in the Al-Saqoor II exercise in Saudi Arabia with the Royal Saudi Air Force. The exercise lasted from 6 to 19 January 2011 and the PAF Chief of Air Staff, ACM Rao Qamar Suleman, also flew during the exercise.

In March 2011 a joint Sino-Pakistani exercise, Shaheen 1, was conducted involving a contingent of Chinese aircraft and personnel from the PLAAF. Information on which aircraft were used by each side in the exercise was not released, but photos of Pakistani pilots inspecting what appeared to be Chinese Shenyang J-11B fighters were released on the internet. The exercise lasted for around 4 weeks and was the first time the PLAAF had deployed to and conducted "operational" aerial maneuvers in Pakistan with the PAF.

== See also ==
- List of aircraft of the Pakistan Air Force
- List of Pakistan Air Force Squadrons
- List of Pakistan Air Force Bases
