= BHJ =

BHJ may refer to:

In optoelectronics:

- Bulk Heterojunctions, a type of junction in organic solar cell

Facilities that share a runway and IATA code:

- Bhuj Airport, domestic airport
- Bhuj Rudra Mata Air Force Base, Indian Air Force base
