= PAF Base Qadri =

Pakistan Air Force base

PAF Base Qadri
- قادری ایئربیس
- Skardu, Baltistan in Pakistan

Site information
- Type: Forward operating base
- Owner: Ministry of Defence
- Operator: Pakistan Air Force
- Controlled by: Northern Air Command
- Open to the public: Yes
- Condition: Operational

Location
- Shown within Gilgit Baltistan PAF Base Qadri (Pakistan)
- Coordinates: 35°20′30″N 75°31′21″E

Site history
- Built: 1949
- Built by: Pakistan Air Force
- In use: 1949 - present
- Battles/wars: Kargil War; 2001–2002 India–Pakistan standoff; 2016–2018 India–Pakistan border skirmishes; 2019 Jammu and Kashmir airstrikes; 2025 India–Pakistan conflict

Garrison information
- Current commander: Air Commodore Jamal Khan
- Garrison: Skardu
- Occupants: 488 Mission Control Center; 909 MRR Squadron

Airfield information
- Identifiers: IATA: KDU, ICAO: OPSD
- Elevation: 2,230 metres (7,316 ft) AMSL
Runways
Direction	Length and surface
14L/32R	3,641 metres (11,946 ft) Asphalt
14R/32L	3,641 metres (11,946 ft) Asphalt

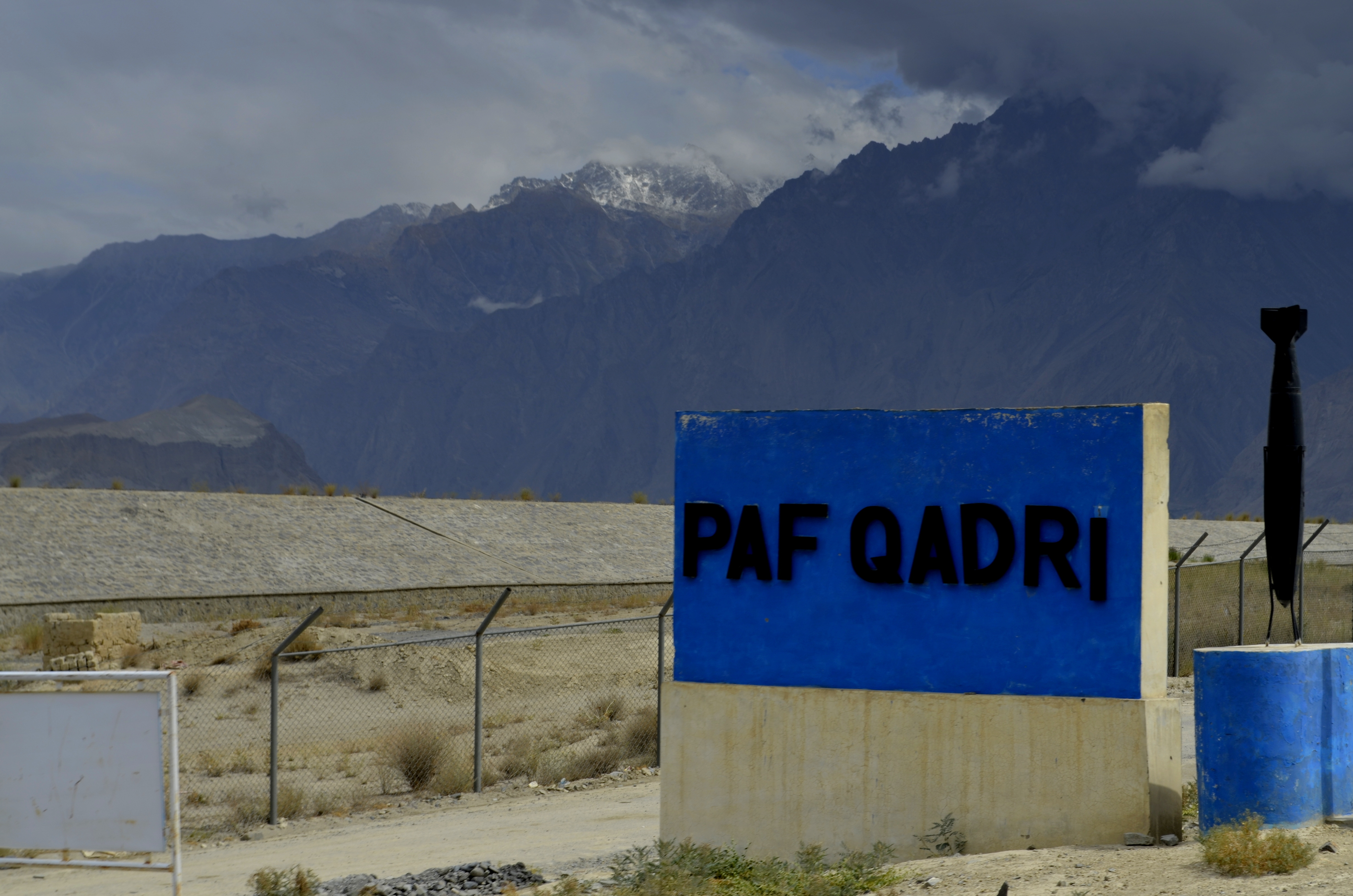
A board bearing the base's name.

Pakistan Air Force Base Qadri or more simply PAF Base Qadri, (Urdu: پی اے ایف بیس قادری) is a main operating base of the Pakistan Air Force's Northern Air Command located near the city of Skardu in the Baltistan region of Pakistan. The airbase is named in honor of the late Air Commodore Abdul Hameed Qadri, a veteran of Soviet Afghan war and recipient of the Sitara-e-Basalat.

== History ==
It was originally built in 1949 as an emergency airstrip together by the Pakistan Air Force and the Balti locals in the area to establish a logistic supply line to Pakistani troops engaged with Indian military in post war skirmishes. It continued to function as PAF Skardu, a satellite of PAF Base Minhas. As time passed, the PAF felt the need for a base in Northern Pakistan as it could only employ F-16s from PAF Base Sargodha and PAF Base Minhas to carry out effective aerial operations over the northern parts of the country.

In 2002, the base commander of Minhas airbase was killed after his Chengdu F-7P Skybolt crashed. PAF Skardu was renamed PAF Qadri in his honor in 2003. By this time, it was hosting Exercise Mountain Camp annually.

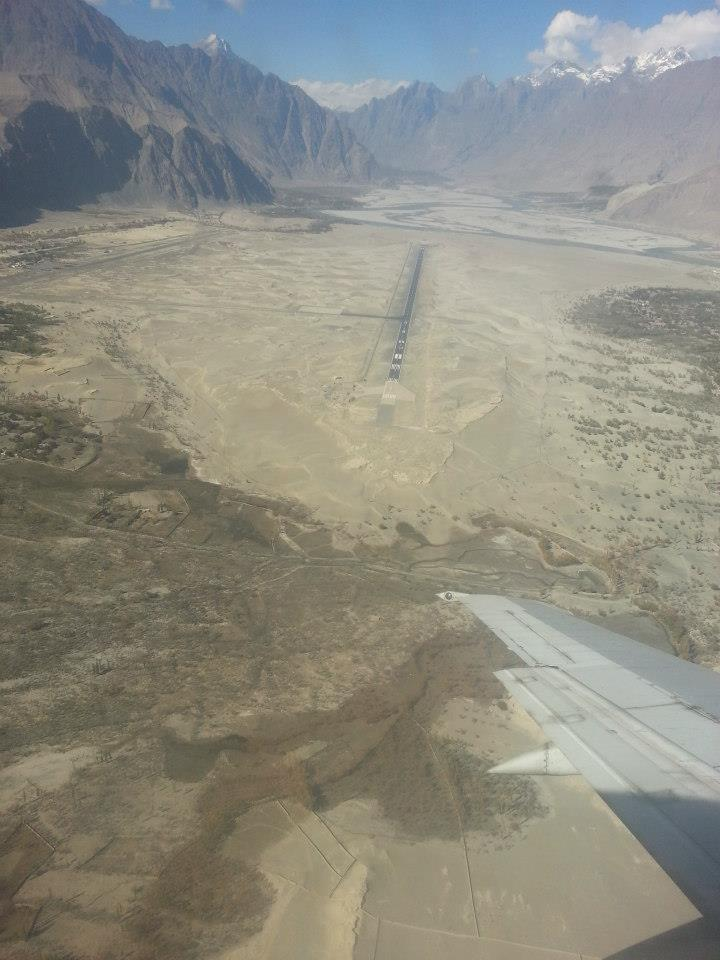
Bird eye view of the runway used jointly by Qadri airbase and Skardu Airport.

In the late 2010s, the camp received major infrastructure upgrades and its status was changed to an FOB+ with its role and task revised accordingly. TPS-77 and SPADA-2000 squadrons were also deployed there for air defense.

During the 2025 India–Pakistan conflict, India launched air and missile strikes on various Pakistani airbases on 10 May 2025 in which it claimed to have damaged PAF Base Qadri. However, local journalists from the area refuted the claims.

== See also ==
- List of Pakistan Air Force bases
