= Michael Kugelman =

American Political Analyst

Michael Kugelman is an American foreign policy author and expert specializing in South Asia. He is the director of the South Asia Institute at the Woodrow Wilson International Center for Scholars. He is a columnist for the Foreign Policy Magazine. His work covers Afghanistan, India, and Pakistan.

== Early life ==
Kugelman completed his bachelor's at the American University School of International Service. He did his masters in law and diplomacy at the Fletcher School at Tufts University.

== Career ==
Kugelman joined the Woodrow Wilson International Center for Scholars in 2007 as head of the South Asia portfolio. He had edited or co-edited 11 books.

Kugelman writes the weekly South Asia Brief of the Foreign Policy. He has written for Al Jazeera, East Asia Forum, Foreign Affairs, Lowy Institute, The Diplomat, The Washington Times, Time, National Interest, New York Times, and War on the Rocks. He has written for Bangladeshi newspapers, such as The Business Standard, and The Daily Star.

== Bibliography ==
- Empty Bellies, Broken Dreams: Food Insecurity and the Future of Pakistan (Vanguard Press, 2011)
- Land Grab? The Race for the World’s Farmland (Wilson Center, 2009)
