= Pathankot Airport =

Airport of Punjab, India

- IATA: IXP; ICAO: VIPK

Summary
- Airport type: Civil
- Owner: Government of India
- Operator: Airports Authority of India
- Serves: Pathankot
- Location: Pathankot, Punjab, India
- Opened: 21 November 2006
- Elevation AMSL: 310 m (1,020 ft)
- Coordinates: 32°14′01″N 075°38′04″E
- Website: https://www.aai.aero/en/airports/pathankot

Map
- Location of airport in India IXP (India)

Runways
Direction	Length		Surface
Direction	m	ft	Surface
01/19	2,734	8,970	Asphalt

Pathankot Airport (IATA: IXP, ICAO: VIPK) is a regional airport, 3 km from the nearest city Pathankot and 7 km from Pathankot Railway Station, located on the Pathankot – Majra Road. Pathankot airport serves domestic flights only. The airport, spread over an area of approximately 75 acres and is connected by road to Pathankot.

Pathankot Airport was inaugurated by Mr. Praful Patel, the then Aviation Minister of India, on 21 November 2006. The facility was made possible by the efforts of Gurdaspur Member of Parliament and Bollywood actor Vinod Khanna, who had planned to make Pathankot a tourist destination and industrial hub.

Commercial flights were resumed on April 5, 2018, after a hiatus of nearly seven years. by Alliance Air, the regional subsidiary of Air India under the Regional Connectivity Scheme.

During the night of 10 May 2025, the Pathankot Air Force Station which shares the main airport's runway was claimed to be targeted by the Pakistan Armed Forces during the 2025 India-Pakistan conflict. However, satellite images clearly show intact runway and buildings at the IAF base.

== Airlines and destinations ==
Airlines	Destinations
Alliance Air	Delhi, Jaipur
