= Jabbi Kasran =

- Union Council
- Location within Pakistan
- Coordinates: 33°39′15″N 72°31′33.4″E
- Country: Pakistan
- Province: Punjab
- District: Attock

Population (2018)
  - Total: 5,000 (village); 8,676 (Union Council)
- Time zone: UTC+5 (PST)

Jabbi Kasran is a village and union council in Attock District of Punjab Province in Pakistan. It is 23 km (14 mi) from Attock District and 17 km (11 mi) from Fateh Jang Tehsil. It is close to Kala Chitta Range and Nandna stream flows across it.

Jabbi Kasran Union Council in Attock District has different villages, including Pind Niazi, Kot Salabat, Batthu, Dordad, Moqam.
