= Bombay Bakery =

Bakery in Hyderabad, Sindh, Pakistan

- Interactive map of Bombay Bakery

Restaurant information
- Established: 1911
- Owner: Aqdas Channa
- Food type: Bakery
- Location: Hyderabad, Sindh, Sindh, Pakistan
- Coordinates: 25°23′16.47″N 68°21′44.88″E

Bombay Bakery is an old bakery located in Hyderabad, Sindh, Pakistan. It was named after an Indian city, Bombay.

== History ==
Bombay Bakery was founded by Pahlajrai Gangaram Thadani in 1911. Thadani, a Sindhi Hindu, was from Dadu, Sindh.

In 1948, Pahlajrai Gangaram Thadani died and his son Kishinchand Thadani became the owner. He expanded the business and wrote a number of recipes.

In 1960, his son, Kumar Thadani took over the business. He remained unmarried throughout his life, adopted a son, Salman Shaikh, who was converted to Islam after his death in 2010.

In 2014, a previously secret recipe was made public by a former baker.

== See also ==
- Karachi Bakery, a similar bakery in Hyderabad, India, named after Karachi, Sindh.
