= Karachi Bakery =

Indian bakery retail company

- Type: Private
- Industry: Retail
- Genre: Bakery
- Founded: 1953
- Founder: Khanchand Ramnani
- Headquarters: Banjara Hills, Hyderabad, India
- Area served: India
- Products: Biscuits, cakes, snacks
- Owners: Rajesh Ramnani; Harish Ramnani
- Website: karachibakery.com

Karachi Bakery is a chain of Indian retail bakeries. It was established in Hyderabad in 1953 by a Sindhi Hindu family that migrated to India during the partition. It is known for its fruit biscuits, Osmania biscuits and dil kush.

Apart from Hyderabad, Karachi Bakery also has outlets in Bengaluru, Chennai and Delhi. The chain also exports a selection of its products to other countries, including Europe, United States, Canada, Australia, New Zealand, Africa and the Middle East.

== History ==
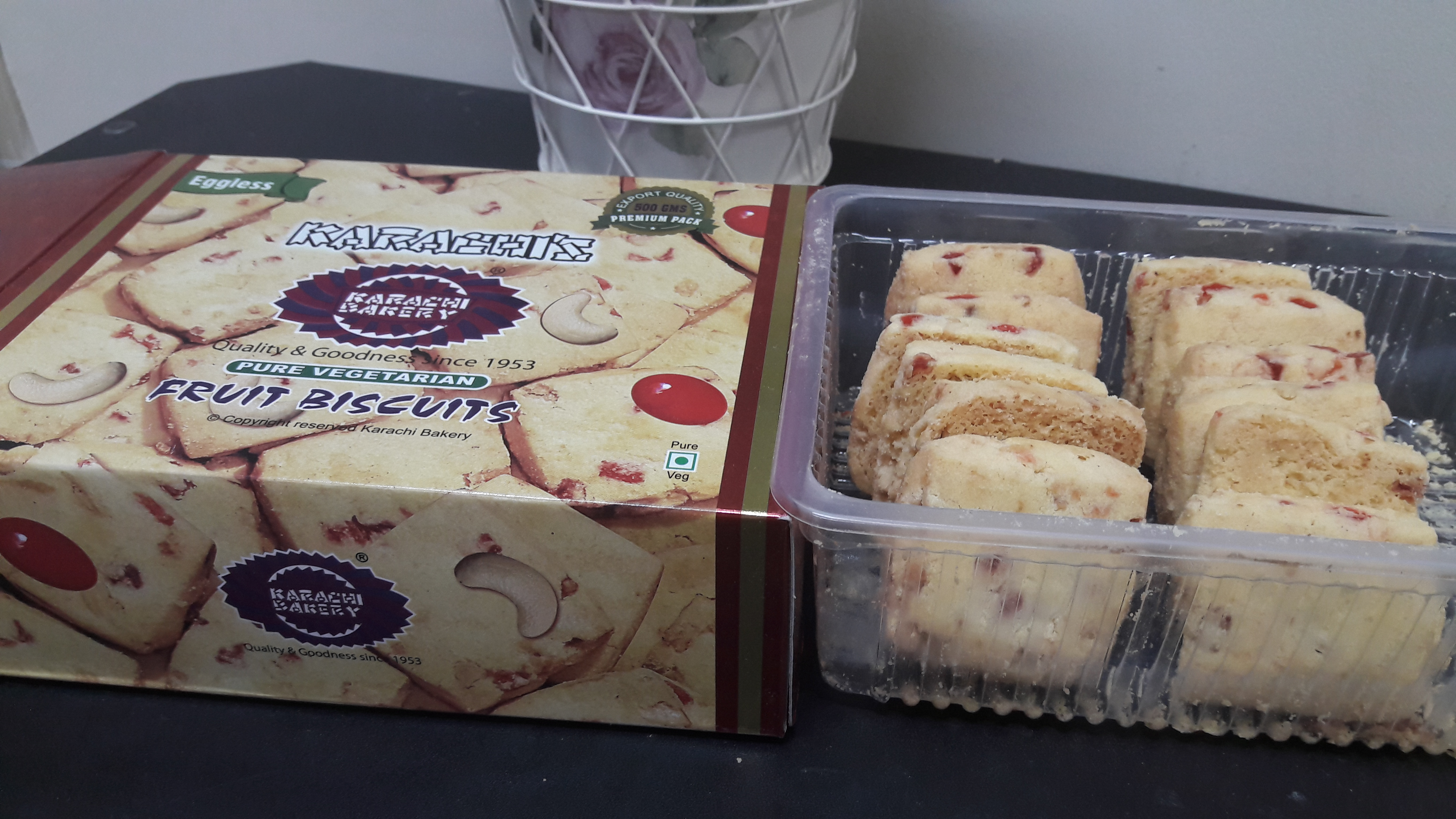
Fruit biscuits from Karachi Bakery

Karachi Bakery was founded in 1953 by Khanchand Ramnani, a Sindhi Hindu migrant who moved to Hyderabad from Karachi during the partition of India in 1947. The bakery was named after Ramnani's original hometown Karachi, which is in present-day Pakistan. Ramnani opened the first Karachi Bakery outlet in Moazzam Jahi Market, Hyderabad.

Karachi Bakery's Mumbai outlet ceased operations during the COVID-19 pandemic due to mounting losses. In 2023, 15 of its employees in Hyderabad suffered injuries due to a fire accident.

== Reception ==
In 2016, Karachi Bakery faced calls for a boycott from some Muslim groups in Hyderabad for selling Israeli dates, after which the company began sourcing dates from Iran.

Owing to its name, Karachi Bakery outlets witnessed incidents of vandalism and protests in 2019 and 2025, in the aftermath of terror attacks in India and amidst India-Pakistan skirmishes, with owners Rajesh and Harish Ramnani clarifying that they have no links to Pakistan.

The bakery has been subject to fines and regulatory action for flouting food safety norms including selling expired food, fungus infested food, improper labeling.

== See also ==
- Sindhis in India
- Bombay Bakery, a Pakistani bakery chain named after an Indian city
- Bombay Sweets, a Bangladeshi food processing company named after an Indian city
