= UK Defence Journal =

Industry news website

- Website type: Online Journalism
- Available in: English
- Owner: Independent
- Editor: George Allison
- Website: ukdefencejournal.org.uk
- Commercial: No
- Registration: No
- Launched: January 2014
- Current status: Active

The UK Defence Journal is a website covering defence industry news in the United Kingdom. In addition to news content, the site also offers commentary and analysis of military topics ranging from national security policy to procurement decisions. The website previously published a monthly magazine of the same name containing news and analysis about the British Armed Forces.

== Reporting ==
In 2016, the website published photos of all of the Royal Navy's Type 45 destroyer fleet in port at the same time, which prompted Sky News to investigate Britain's naval preparedness.

In July 2021, the website reported that a user leaked classified documents relating to the Challenger 2 main battle tank in service with the British Army when challenging the representation of the vehicle in the video game War Thunder.

In August 2022, the website was the first to break the news about the breakdown of the British aircraft carrier HMS Prince of Wales, on the first day of the ship's deployment to the United States.

In June 2025, the UK Defence Journal was the first outlet to report that a number of anonymous X accounts promoting Scottish independence had ceased posting during a widespread internet outage in Iran following Israeli air strikes. The UK Defence Journal article noted that the timing of the inactivity aligned with patterns previously associated with coordinated online influence activity, referencing earlier research by the disinformation analysis firm Cyabra. The reporting was subsequently cited by national media outlets, contributing to wider coverage of alleged Iranian-linked online activity connected to Scottish independence discourse. The coverage also prompted calls from politicians for investigations into potential foreign interference in UK politics.
