= No. 501 Signal Unit, IAF =

No. 501 Signal Unit
- Active: 5 October 1964 – present
- Country: Republic of India
- Branch: Indian Air Force
- Garrison/HQ: Barnala AFS

No. 501 Signal Unit is an Indian Air Force Signal Unit based at Barnala Air Force Station in Barnala, Punjab State, India.

== History ==
The unit was raised on 5 October 1964 at 9 Wing of the Indian Air Force. In May 1965, it was shifted to Barnala and started operating the Star Sapphire radar. The unit converted to the THD radar in January 1981.

In September 1982, it was renamed to 42 Signal Unit and was nicknamed Madbees (Master of Air Defence Barnala). In September 1991, it reverted to its original name of 501 Signal Unit.

The unit was awarded the presidential standard on 10 November 2016.

=== Equipment ===
- Star Sapphire radar
- THD radar
