= Beas Airport =

Airport in Amritsar, Punjab, India

- IATA: none; ICAO: VIBS

Summary
- Airport type: Private
- Owner: Radha Soami Satsang Beas
- Serves: Amritsar
- Location: Beas
- Elevation AMSL: 820 ft / 250 m
- Coordinates: 31°33′38″N 75°20′28″E

Map
- Location of airport in India VIBS (India)

Runways
Direction	Length		Surface
Direction	ft	m	Surface
15/33	12,000	3,657.6	Asphalt

Beas Airport is a civil aerodrome located in Amritsar, Punjab in India. The airport is the main base of private jets of Radha Soami Satsang Beas and used exclusively for their personal travel. As of now, the airport does not serve any scheduled flight operations. The nearest airport to Beas Airport is Sri Guru Ram Dass Jee International Airport, the primary airport serving Amritsar.

== Area ==
The Airport is spread over an 497,214 m^{2} and perimeter length of 6043 metre.

== Future Plans ==
There are plans to start scheduled flight operations from the airport in future. Ministry of Civil Aviation has identified Beas airport under its UDAN-Regional Connectivity Scheme. The airlines would be permitted to run short flights of less than 1 hour on these routes and the fare has been capped at Rs. 2500, in order to promote regional connectivity scheme.

== Satellite Airport ==
Due to the fast pace of growing aviation industry in India, it is projected that over 31 cities will need 2nd airport by 2040. Beas Airport can act as a 'satellite airport' or 'second airport' serving Amritsar after SGRDJ-Amritsar International Airport.
