= Bhuj Rudra Mata Air Force Station =

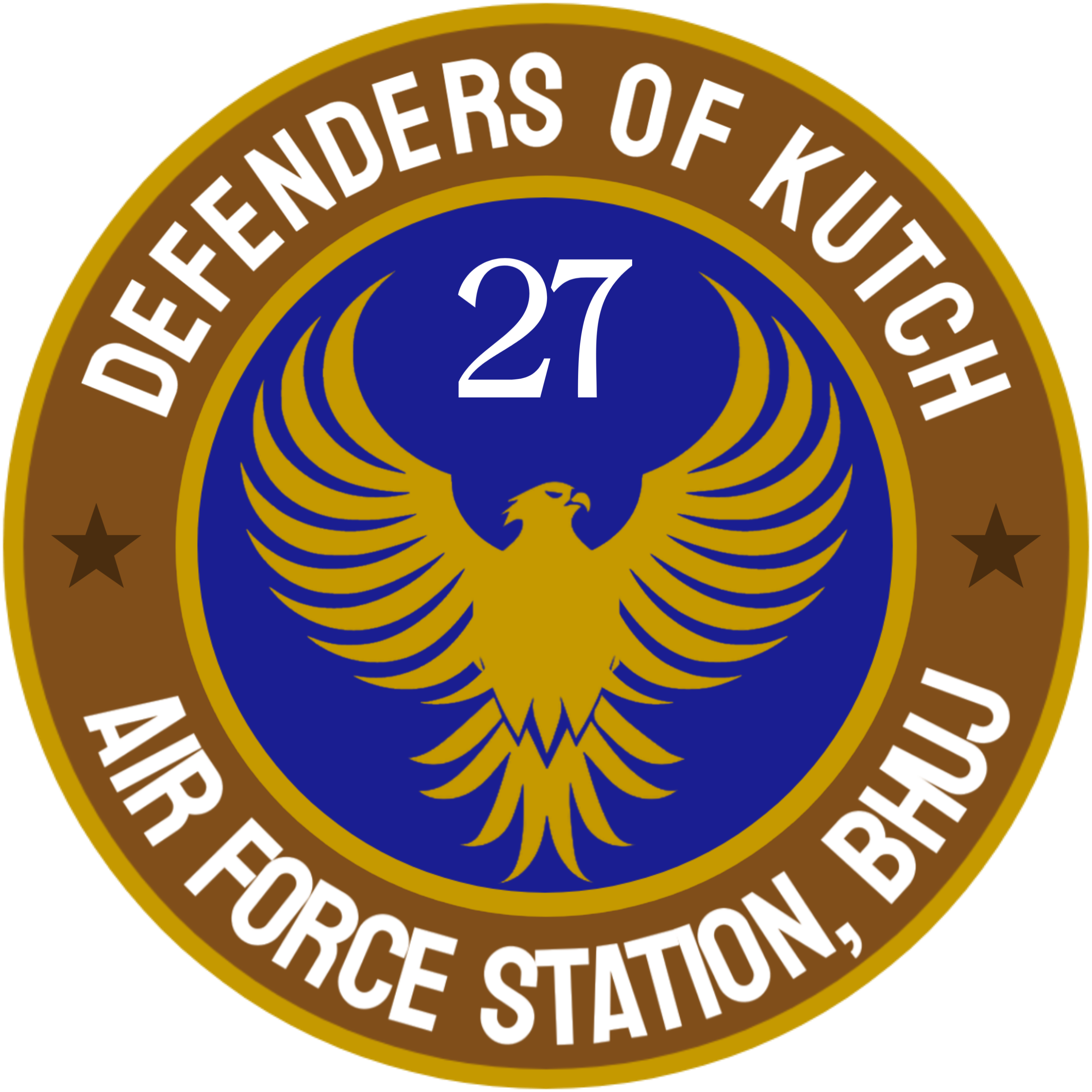
- Badge of the 27 Wing of IAF
- IATA: BHJ; ICAO: VABJ

Summary
- Airport type: Military/Public
- Operator: Indian Air Force; Airports Authority of India
- Location: Bhuj
- Elevation AMSL: 268 ft / 82 m
- Coordinates: 23°17′16″N 069°40′13″E
- Interactive map of Bhuj Rudra Mata Air Force Station

Runways
Direction	Length		Surface
Direction	ft	m	Surface
05/23	8,205	2,501	Asphalt

Bhuj Rudra Mata Air Force Station (IATA: BHJ, ICAO: VABJ) is an Indian Air Force Station, which shares its runway with Bhuj Airport at the town of Bhuj in Gujarat, India. It is part of South Western Air Command.

Bhuj Air Force Station houses the 27 Wing.
