= PNS Tughril (F261) =

Pakistani Frigate

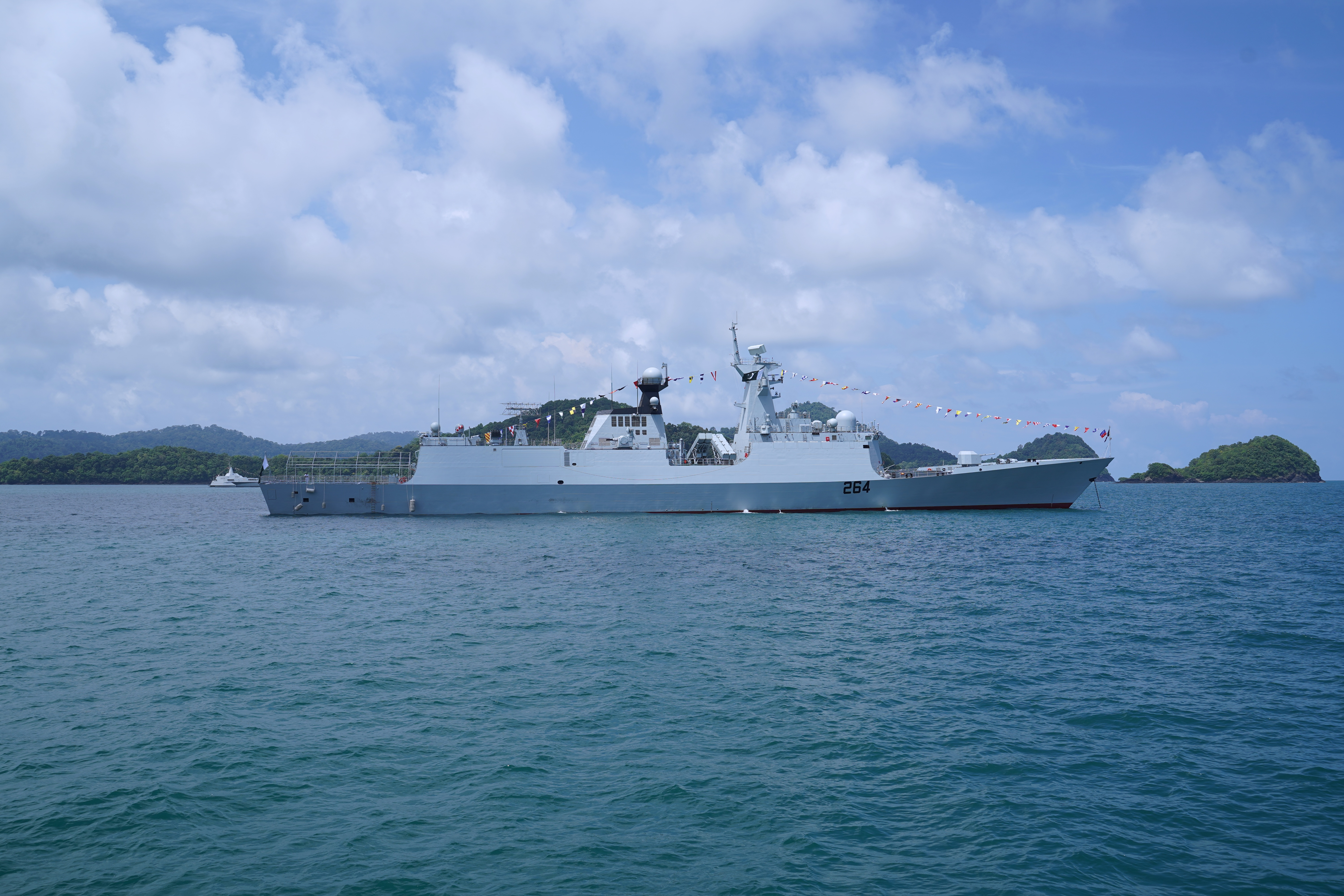
- Sister ship PNS Shah Jahan

History

Pakistan
- Name: PNS Tughril
- Namesake: Tughril
- Ordered: 2018
- Launched: 29 January 2021
- Acquired: 23 June 2022
- Commissioned: 23 June 2022
- Status: In active service

General characteristics
- Type: Guided-missile frigate
- Displacement: 4,200 t (4,100 long tons)
- Length: 134 m (439 ft 8 in)
- Beam: 16 m (52 ft 6 in)
- Propulsion: CODAD; 4 × Shaanxi Shaanxi 16 PA6 STC diesel engines (Each producing 5700 kW)
- Speed: 27 knots (50 km/h; 31 mph)
- Range: 8,025 nmi (14,862 km; 9,235 mi)
- Complement: 165
- Sensors & processing systems: Radar :-; SR2410C AESA radar.; Type 517 (SUR17B) VHF air-search radar.; Type 344 fire-control radar (for SSM); 4 × MR-90 Front Dome (for SAM); MR-36A surface-surveillance radar; Type 347G fire-control radar (for H/PJ-26 naval gun); 2 × Racal RM-1290 I Band navigation radar; Sonar :-; MGK-335 medium frequency active/passive sonar system; H/SJG-206 towed array sonar; Communications :-; ZKJ-5 combat data-system (developed from Thomson-CSF TAVITAC); HN-900 data link (Chinese equivalent of Link 11); SNTI-240 SATCOM; AKD5000S Ku-band SATCOM
- Electronic warfare & decoys: Type 922-1 radar warning receiver (RWR); HZ-100 ECM/ELINT system; Kashtan-3 missile jamming system
- Armament: Anti-air warfare :-; 1 × 32-cell VLS; LY-80N surface-to-air missiles; Anti-surface warfare :-; 1 × 1-cell P-282 SMASH anti-ship ballistic missile; 2 × 2-cell CM-302 anti-ship missiles; Anti-submarine warfare :-; 2 × Type 87 anti-submarine rocket launcher; 2 × Yu-7 anti-submarine torpedo launchers; Guns :-; 1 × 76mm H/PJ-26 naval gun; 2 × Type 1130 CIWS; Decoys :-; 2 × Type 726-4 decoy-launchers
- Aircraft carried: 1 × Harbin Z-9EC (equipped with CM-501GA land-attack missile)
- Aviation facilities: Flight deck and enclosed helicopter hangar capable of accommodating Harbin Z-9 (or) Kamov Ka-27.
- Notes: Pakistan-specific variant of Type 054A frigate.; Most technologically-sophisticated warships ever exported by China to date.

PNS Tughril ( F261) is the first of four Chinese built Type 054A/P (Tughril-class) frigates ordered by the Pakistan Navy. It was commissioned on 8 November 2021. The Type 054A/P carries HQ-16 medium-range air defense missiles which is an upgrade from the HQ-7 and anti-submarine missiles in a vertical launching system (VLS) system.The ship is named after Emperor Tughril, who was among the founders of the Seljuk Empire.

== Service ==
Tughril was formally commissioned into the Pakistan Navy on 24 January 2022, at the Karachi Naval Dockyard, with Pakistan's president - Arif Alvi and the chief of the Pakistan Navy - Amjad Khan Niazi, in attendance. The formal commissioning of Tughril coincided with the induction of ten second-hand WS-61 Sea King naval helicopters into the Pakistan Naval Air Arm.

== See Also ==
- PNS Tughril
- INS Nilgiri
