= PNS Tippu Sultan (F263) =

Pakistani Frigate

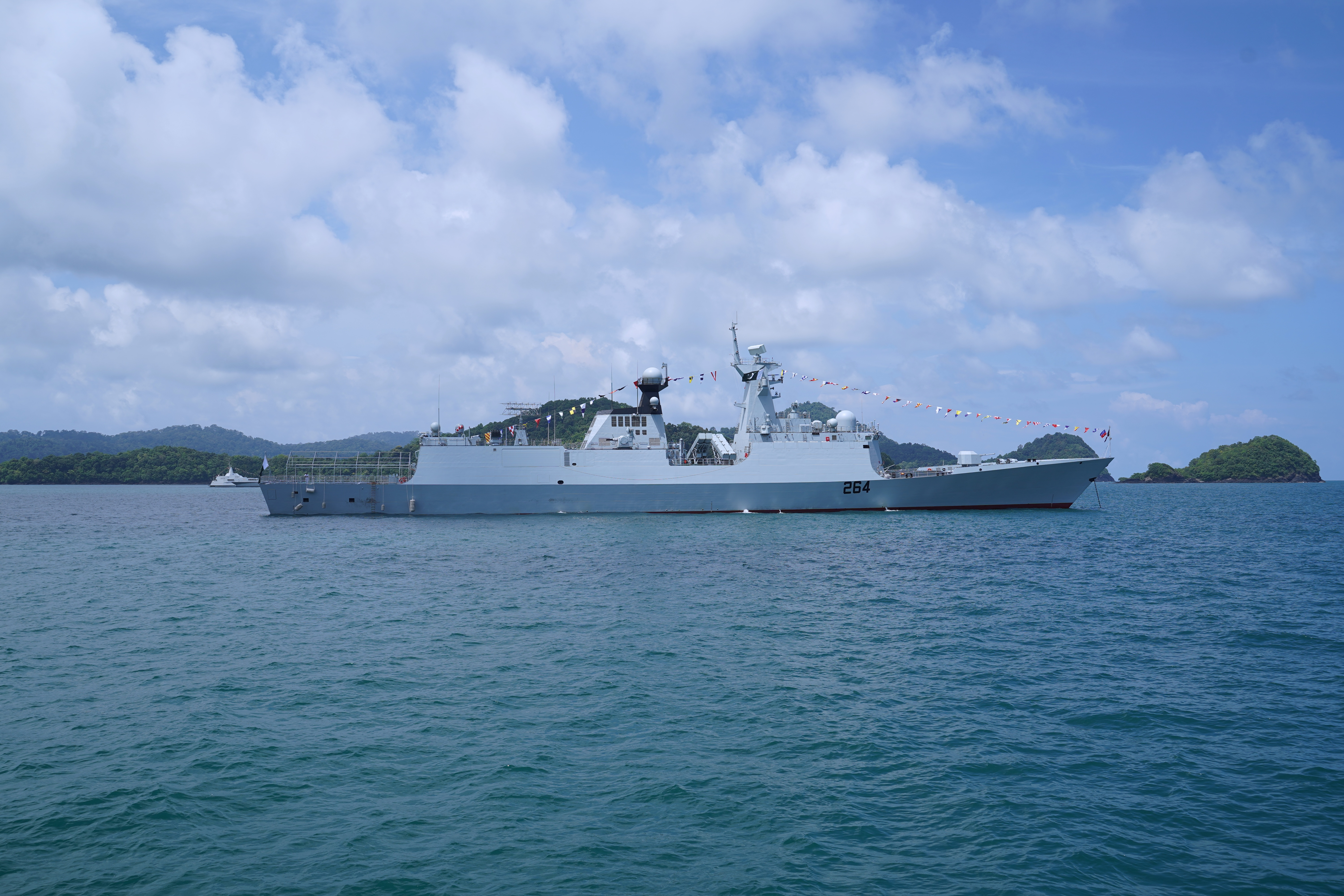
- Sister ship PNS Shah Jahan

History

Pakistan
- Name: PNS Tippu Sultan
- Namesake: Tippu Sultan
- Ordered: 2018
- Launched: 3 August 2021
- Acquired: 10 May 2023
- Commissioned: 10 May 2023
- Status: In active service

General characteristics
- Type: Guided-missile frigate
- Displacement: 4,200 t (4,100 long tons)
- Length: 134 m (439 ft 8 in)
- Beam: 16 m (52 ft 6 in)
- Propulsion: CODAD; 4 × Shaanxi Shaanxi 16 PA6 STC diesel engines (Each producing 5700 kW)
- Speed: 27 knots (50 km/h; 31 mph)
- Range: 8,025 nmi (14,862 km; 9,235 mi)
- Complement: 165
- Sensors & processing systems: Radar :-; SR2410C AESA radar.; Type 517 (SUR17B) VHF air-search radar.; Type 344 fire-control radar (for SSM); 4 × MR-90 Front Dome (for SAM); MR-36A surface-surveillance radar; Type 347G fire-control radar (for H/PJ-26 naval gun); 2 × Racal RM-1290 I Band navigation radar; Sonar :-; MGK-335 medium frequency active/passive sonar system; H/SJG-206 towed array sonar; Communications :-; ZKJ-5 combat data-system (developed from Thomson-CSF TAVITAC); HN-900 data link (Chinese equivalent of Link 11); SNTI-240 SATCOM; AKD5000S Ku-band SATCOM
- Electronic warfare & decoys: Type 922-1 radar warning receiver (RWR); HZ-100 ECM/ELINT system; Kashtan-3 missile jamming system
- Armament: Anti-air warfare :-; 1 × 32-cell VLS; LY-80N surface-to-air missiles; Anti-surface warfare :-; 1 × 1-cell P-282 SMASH anti-ship ballistic missile; 2 × 2-cell CM-302 anti-ship missiles; Anti-submarine warfare :-; 2 × Type 87 anti-submarine rocket launcher; 2 × Yu-7 anti-submarine torpedo launchers; Guns :-; 1 × 76mm H/PJ-26 naval gun; 2 × Type 1130 CIWS; Decoys :-; 2 × Type 726-4 decoy-launchers
- Aircraft carried: 1 × Harbin Z-9EC (equipped with CM-501GA land-attack missile)
- Aviation facilities: Flight deck and enclosed helicopter hangar capable of accommodating Harbin Z-9 (or) Kamov Ka-27.

PNS Tippu Sultan is the third of four Chinese built Type 054A/P (Tughril-class) frigates ordered by the Pakistan Navy. The Ship was launched on 3 August 2021. She was commissioned along with her sister ship PNS Shah Jahan (F264) on 10 May 2023 at the Hudong Zhonghua shipyard in Shanghai, China. She is a Pakistan-specific variant of Type 054A frigate and the most technologically sophisticated warships ever exported by China to date. She visited and conducted naval exercises with the Sri Lankan Navy in 2023, during her delivery voyage. PNS Tippu Sultan was used to test the SMASH missile in November 2025.

== See also ==
- PNS Tippu Sultan
