= Army Rocket Force Command =

Missile command of Pakistan Army

- Active: August 13, 2025; 15 months ago
- Country: Pakistan
- Branch: Pakistan Army
- Type: Conventional Missile Force
- Role: Strategic deterrence, Conventional missile deployment
- Size: Corps
- Headquarters: GHQ in Chaklala, Punjab, Pakistan
- Equipment: Fatah (MRL)

Commanders
- Commander: Lt Gen Muhammad Ishaq Khattak

The Army Rocket Force Command (ARFC) is a command of the Pakistan Army tasked with controlling and operating conventional rockets and missiles (including cruise missiles) as well as multi-rocket launchers in order to enhance non-nuclear high-precision deep-strike capabilities.

== History ==
=== Formation ===
On 13 August 2025, Prime Minister Shehbaz Sharif announced the formation of the Army Rocket Force Command during a ceremony at Jinnah Sports Stadium in Islamabad, held a day ahead of Pakistan's 78th Independence Day and three months after the 2025 India–Pakistan conflict.

The ARFC has been tasked with controlling and operating conventional rockets and missiles and will primarily control short-to-medium range conventional missiles. According to Prime Minister Shehbaz Sharif, the force will be equipped with modern technology and capable of targeting the enemy "from every direction." He described it as "another milestone" in strengthening Pakistan's conventional war capabilities. The new formation is tasked to unify, modernize, and supercharge the Pakistani missile and rocket forces.

The establishment of the Army Rocket Force Command consolidates conventional and rocket units from several formations and specialist detachments into a single operational command give Pakistan Army deep-strike capabilities without relying on nuclear capable missiles under Army Strategic Forces Command. The ARFC will be overseen by the army's General Headquarters (GHQ), expected to be led by a three-star general.

=== Missile tests ===
On 30 September 2025, the Pakistani military's Inter-Services Public Relations (ISPR) media wing announced that it conducted a successful test of the Fatah-IV surface-to-surface cruise missile, which has a range of 750 km. It was the first missile test carried out since the formation of the Army Rocket Force Command, and the ISPR said that the indigenously developed Fatah-IV would operate as part of ARFC.

On 28 April 2026, the Army Rocket Force Command carried out a successful "training launch" of the Fatah-II multiple launch rocket system (MLRS).

On 7 May 2026, Fatah-III supersonic cruise missile unveiled by Pakistan Military media wing ISPR during a press briefing on the first anniversary of Operation Bunyan al-Marsoos.

On 14 May 2026, the Army Rocket Force Command conducted the second successful test-fire of the indigenously developed Fatah-IV ground-launched cruise missile, which has a range of 750 km.

On 6 October 2026, the Army Rocket Force Command (ARFC) conducted a successful test launch of an extended-range variant of the Fatah-IV ground-launched cruise missile, designated as the Fatah-IV ER, defense analysts estimate the extended variant's operational range exceeds 1000 km.

On 13 October 2026, the Army Rocket Force Command (ARFC) conducted a successful test launch of an extended-range variant of the Fatah-II Extended Range hypersonic ballistic missile, designated as the Fatah-II ER, defense analysts estimate the extended variant's operational ranges between 700-1000 km.

On 18 November 2026, the Army Rocket Force Command conducted a successful test-launch of the indigenously developed Fatah-III supersonic cruise missile, equipped with advanced navigation and propulsion systems to engage targets at long ranges with high precision.

== Equipment ==
=== Primary Weapons ===
List of rockets & missiles currently operational with ARFC
Name	Image	Origin	Type	Speed	Operational Range	Variants	Warhead	Barrels	Notes
Fatah-I		Pakistan	Guided MLRS	Supersonic	140 km	Fatah-I	Conventional	8	—
Fatah-II		Pakistan	Quasi Ballistic Missile	Supersonic	290 km	Fatah-II E (Export)	Conventional	2	—
Fatah-II		Pakistan	Quasi Ballistic Missile	Supersonic	400 km	Fatah-II	Conventional	2	—
Fatah-II		Pakistan	Quasi Ballistic Missile	Hypersonic	700 – 1000 km (unofficial)	Fatah-II ER (Extended Range)	Conventional	2	—
Fatah-III		Pakistan	Cruise Missile	Supersonic	300 – 650 km (unofficial)	Fatah-III	Conventional	4	Based on Chinese HD-1.
Fatah-IV		Pakistan	Cruise Missile	Subsonic	750 km	Fatah-IV	Conventional	3	—
Fatah-IV		Pakistan	Cruise Missile	Subsonic	1,200 km	Fatah-IV ER	Conventional	3	—
Fatah-V		Pakistan	Unknown	Unknown	1,000 km (unofficial)	Fatah-V	Conventional	Unknown	

=== Secondary Weapons ===
List of rockets & missiles expected to likely be in service of the ARFC
Name	Image	Origin	Type	Speed	Operational Range	Warhead	Barrels	Notes
KRL-122 Ghazab		Russia	MLRS		40 km	Conventional	40	122 mm MLRS. Based on the Soviet BM-21 Grad. The system can launch POF built Yarmuk rocket and is locally designated as the "Ghazab".
Azar MLRS		China	MLRS		40 km	Conventional	40	122 mm MLRS. Based on the Chinese Type 81 variant of the BM-21 Grad. The system is built locally and designated as the "Azar".
A-100E		China	Semi-guided MLRS		100 km	Conventional	10	300 mm MLRS which is built locally on license. The system can launch CALT-built rocket having maximum range of 120 km.

== List of Commanders ==
List of Commanders of Army Rocket Force Command
#	Incumbent	Start of Tenure	End of Tenure
1.	Muhammad Ishaq Khattak	October 2026	Incumbent

== See also ==
- Pakistan Army
- Pakistan Army Artillery Regiment Corps
- Pakistan Army Air Defence Corps
- Army Air Defence Command (Pakistan)
- Air Defence Command (Pakistan)
- Strategic Plans Division Force
- India–Pakistan relations
- People's Liberation Army Rocket Force
- Integrated Rocket Force (India)
