= Model Colony railway station =

Railway station in Pakistan

General information
- Coordinates: 24.9007°N 67.1939°E
- Owner: Ministry of Railways

Other information
- Station code: MDCL

History
- Former names: Great Indian Peninsula Railway
Location

Model Colony railway station (Urdu: ماڈل کالونی ریلوے اسٹیشن) is located in Malir Cantonment, Karachi, Pakistan.

== See also ==
- List of railway stations in Pakistan
- Pakistan Railways
