= HQ-20 =

Chinese surface-to-air missile system

- Type: Surface to air missile Anti-Ballistic Missile
- Place of origin: China

Service history
- In service: 2025 - present
- Used by: People's Liberation Army Air Force

Production history
- Developed from: HQ-16

Specifications
- Operational range: 160 km (99 mi)
- Flight altitude: 25 km
- Launch platform: TAS5450 TEL

The HQ-20 (Chinese: 红旗-20; pinyin: Hóng Qí-20; lit. 'Red Banner-20') is a Chinese medium- to long-range surface-to-air missile (SAM) system, debuted at the 2025 China Victory Day Parade. The HQ-20 air defense system features an eight-axial transporter erector launcher capable of carrying at least eight smaller interceptors. Its design closely resembles the HQ-9 system, but with a higher quantity and thinner missile configuration. The missile is reportedly designed for mid-tier air defense coverage, sitting in between the short-range point defense systems and high-end long-range air defense systems. The missile could serve a role comparable to PAC-2 and PAC-3 air defense system.

== Design ==
The HQ-20 air defense system is mounted on the 8x8 Taian TA5450 truck platform. An air defense battery consists of one command vehicle, one guidance vehicle, and multiple launch vehicles. The command vehicle carries a meter-wave search radar. The guidance radar features an active electronically scanned array (AESA) radar with a range of 500 km (310 mi), simultaneous tracking of 100 targets, and simultaneous engagement of 8 targets. The gross weight of the truck platform is 25 t (25 long tons; 28 short tons), capable of cross-country mobility and field deployment.

The HQ-20 missile is improved upon the HQ-16, with a shorter length at 5–5.2 m (16–17 ft), a thinner diameter, so that a single launcher vehicle can carry eight interceptors instead of six. The missile has an engagement range of 160 km (99 mi) and an engagement altitude of 10–25,000 m (33–82,021 ft), covering targets from low-flying cruise missiles to high-altitude aircraft. The missile is powered by a dual pulse rocket motors with a specific impulse of 120 seconds and a terminal velocity of higher than Mach 4. The missile is guided by an inertial navigation system, mid-course datalink, and terminal active radar homing. The missile head features a miniature AESA radar with 30 km (19 mi) tracking range and fire-and-forget mode.

== See also ==
- HQ-16
