= PNS Tughril =

PNS Tughril may refer to following ships of the Pakistan Navy:

- PNS Tughril (1951), the former British O-class destroyer HMS Onslaught (G04) acquired by Pakistan in 1951 and scrapped in 1977.
- PNS Tughril (D167), the former United States Gearing-class destroyer USS Henderson (DD-785) acquired by the Pakistan Navy in 1980 and renamed. She was transferred to the Pakistan Maritime Security Agency in 1988 and renamed Nazim. She was decommissioned in 2001.
- PNS Tughril (F261) the Type 054A/P frigate classified as Tughril-class frigate for the Pakistan Navy.
