= PNS Shah Jahan =

PNS Shah Jahan of Shahjahan may refer to one of the following ships of the Pakistan Navy:

- PNS Shah Jahan (DD-962), the former British C-class destroyer HMS Charity (R29) launched in 1944; acquired by the Pakistan Navy via the United States in 1958; ship was badly damaged in 1971 in the Indo-Pakistani War; scrapped in 1982
- PNS Shah Jahan (D164), the former American Gearing-class destroyer USS Harold J. Ellison (DD-864) launched in 1945; acquired by the Pakistan Navy in October 1983 and classed as a Alamgir-class destroyer; sunk as a missile target in 1994
- PNS Shah Jahan (D186), the former British Type 21 frigate HMS Active (F171) launched in 1972; acquired by the Pakistan Navy in 1994 and classed as a Tariq-class destroyer. Expended as a target in 2021
- PNS Shah Jahan (F264), the Tughril-class frigate commissioned in 2023
