= HD-1 =

Chinese anti-ship missile

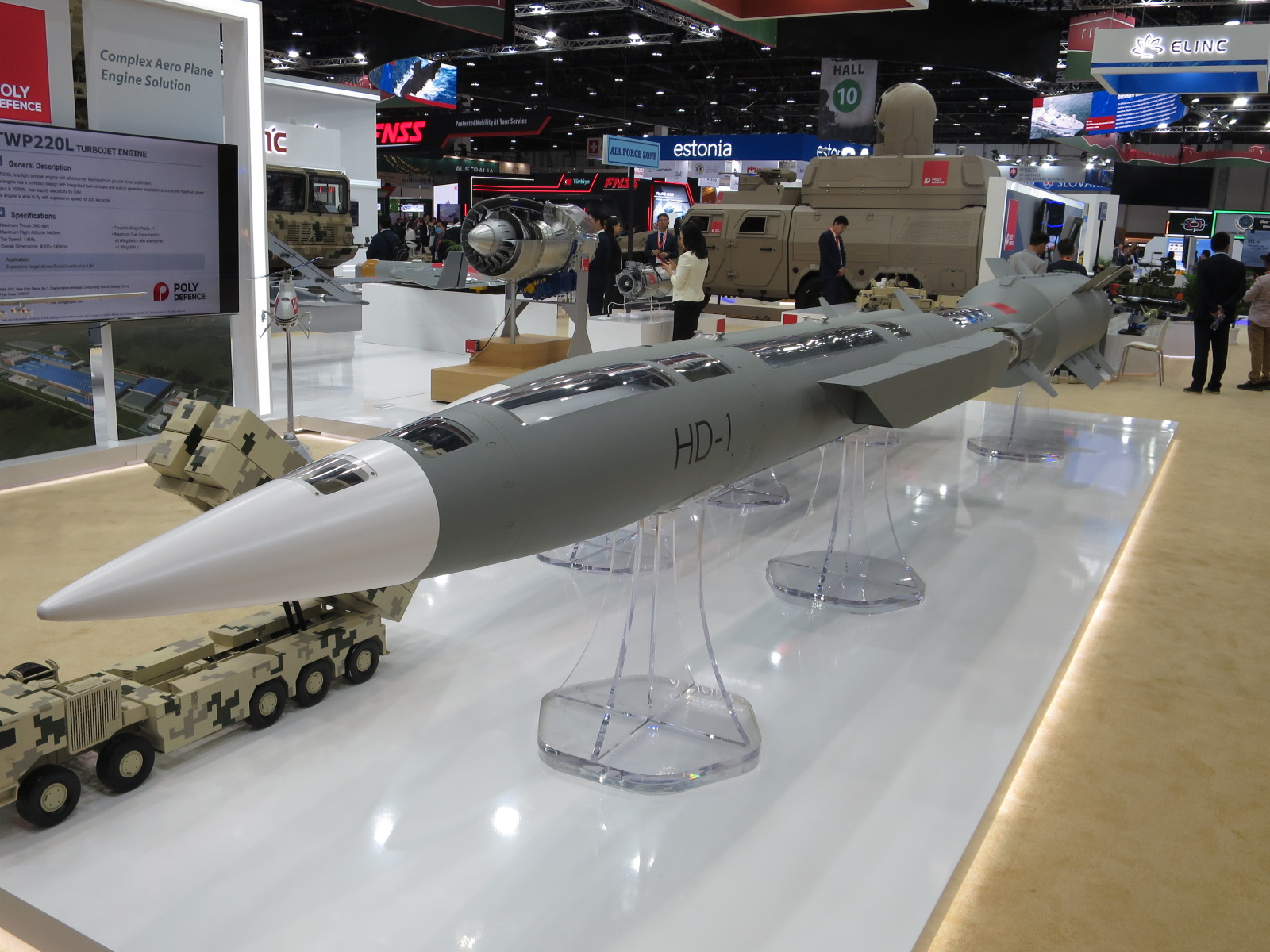
- HD-1 mockup at IDEX 2023
- Type: Anti-ship/land-attack cruise missile
- Place of origin: People's Republic of China

Service history
- Used by: People's Liberation Army Navy

Production history
- Manufacturer: Guangdong Hongda

Specifications
- Mass: 2,200 kg launch weight
- Length: 8.3 m (27 ft)
- Diameter: 0.375 m (1.23 ft) missile body
- Warhead: 240–400 kg (530–880 lb) Unitary or cluster
- Engine: integrated ramjet with solid rocket booster
- Operational range: 290 km
- Flight altitude: 15 km (cruise), 5-10 m (attack)
- Maximum speed: Mach 2.2 to Mach 3.5 (depending on the flight profile)
- Guidance system: Inertial navigation system (INS)/Satellite guidance Terminal radar/infrared guidance
- Launch platform: Aircraft, ships

HD-1 is a supersonic land-attack and anti-ship missile developed by Guangdong Hongda Mining Company. The HD-1 is powered by a ramjet engine and a solid rocket booster.

== History and development ==
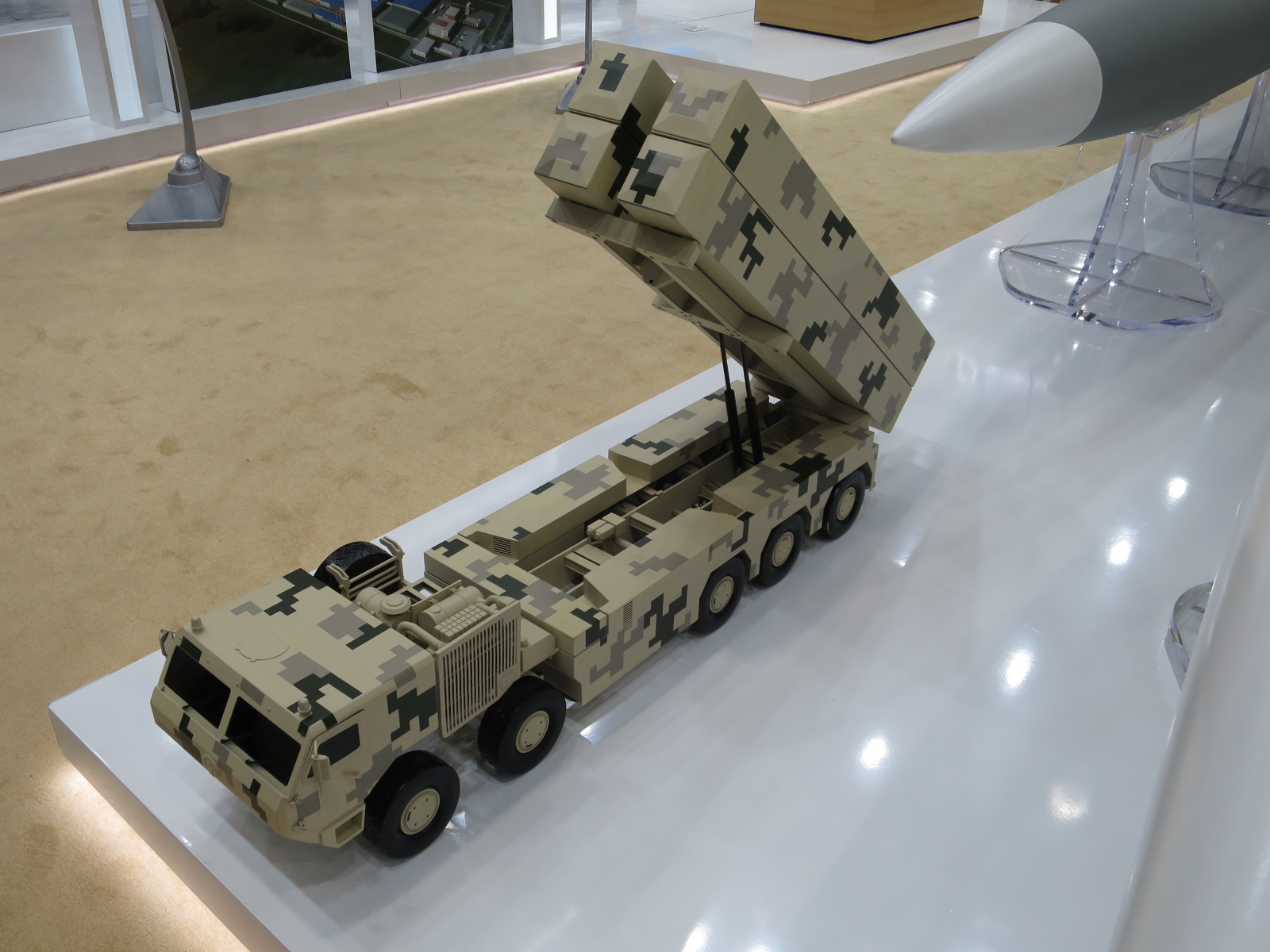
HD-1 launch vehicle mockup

The HD-1 is a private, export-oriented missile project developed by the Guangdong Hongda Mining Company, a Guangzhou-based company specializing in industrial explosives. It was first revealed in 2018.

The technology of the HD-1 missile was reportedly sold to Pakistan, used to develop the latter's Fatah-3 supersonic cruise missile.

== Design ==
The HD-1 is a family of supersonic cruise missiles powered by a combination of a solid rocket booster and a ramjet engine. The booster is used to launch the missile into optimal speed and initiate the ramjet engine. The missile features tapered control surfaces for maneuvers. The missile has a reported range of 290 km (180 mi). This figure could be higher in reality, as the number could be intentionally conservative to follow the Missile Technology Control Regime (MTCR).

== See also ==
Related development

- YJ-12 – (China)
- YJ-18 – (China)
- Fatah (Pakistan)

Comparable missiles

- 3M-54 Klub – (Russia)
- BrahMos – (India, Russia)
- P-800 Oniks – (Russia)
- Future Cruise/Anti-Ship Weapon – (France, Italy, United Kingdom)
- ASM-3 – (Japan)
- Yun Feng – (Taiwan)
