= 153 Light Air Defence (SP) Regiment =

Pakistani military unit

- Founded: 9 May 1993
- Country: Pakistan
- Branch: Pakistan Army
- Role: Anti-aircraft warfare
- Part of: Army Air Defence Corps
- Engagements: Gulf War 1990–1993; Kargil War 1999–2000; War on terror

Commanders
- Brigadier Fayaz Farrooq: Colonel of the Regiment

The 153 Light Air Defence (SP) Regiment is an anti-aircraft warfare regiment of the Pakistan Army. It was raised on 9 May 1993 from an independent air defence battery and was deployed in Tabuk, Saudi Arabia from 1990 to 1993 as part of Operation Desert Storm. It was conferred with the title 'Fakhr-e-Tabuk' as a result of its performance.

The regiment was also deployed in the Kargil War in 1999 where it downed an Indian Mikoyan MiG-27 fighter aircraft using a domestically produced ANZA Mark 1 missile.
