= Fatah (multiple rocket launcher) =

Pakistani Guided MLRS family

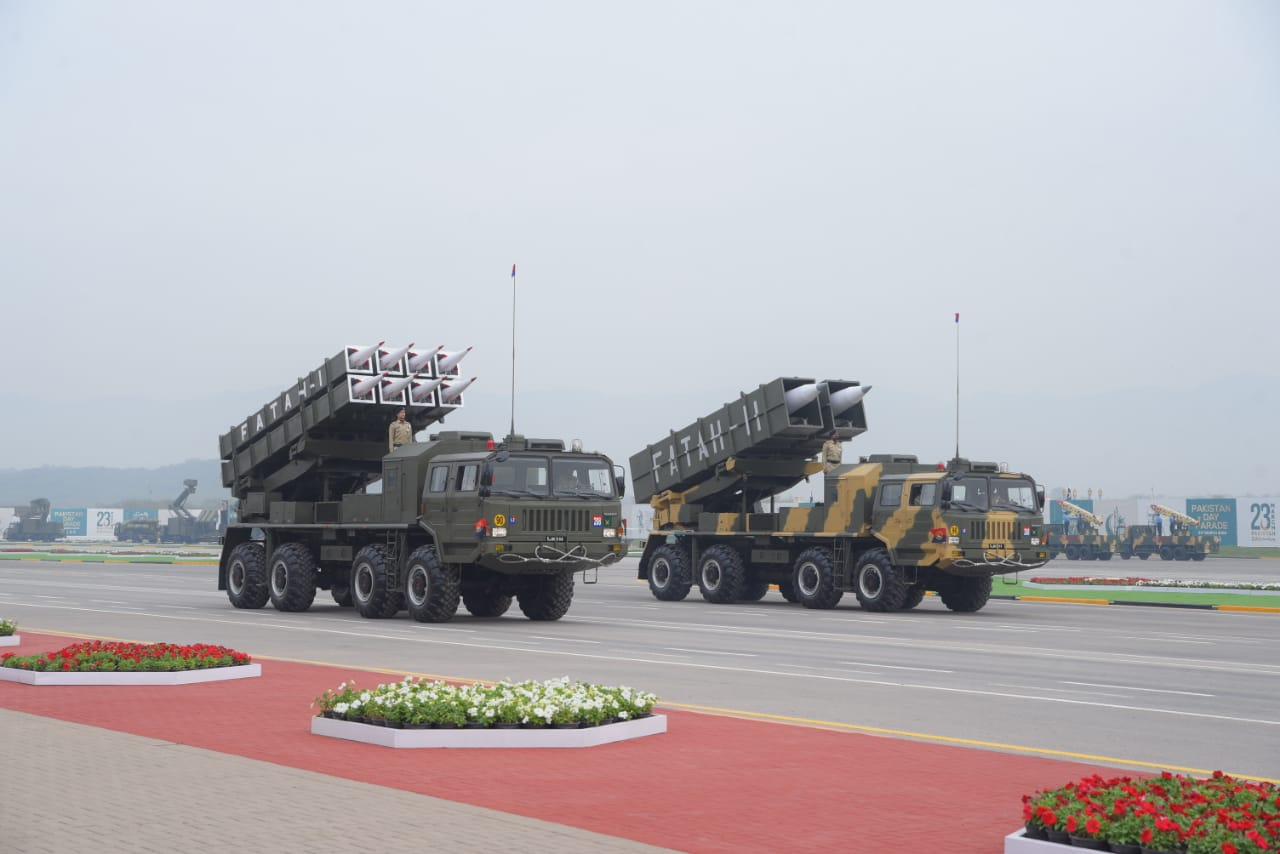
- Fatah-1 and Fatah-2
- Type: Guided Multiple rocket launcher Cruise missile
- Place of origin: Pakistan

Service history
- In service: 2021–present
- Used by: Pakistan Army (ARFC)
- Wars: 2024 Iran–Pakistan cross-border strikes; Operation Marg Bar Sarmachar; 2025 India-Pakistan standoff; Operation Bunyanun Marsoos

Production history
- Designer: NESCOM; GIDS
- Designed: 2015–present
- Manufacturer: NESCOM
- Produced: 2021–present
- Variants: Fatah-I; Fatah-II; Fatah-III; Fatah-IV; Fatah-V

Specifications
- Length: 8m (Fatah-I); 7.5m (Fatah-II)
- Crew: 4
- Caliber: 300 mm (Fatah-I)
- Barrels: 8 (Fatah-I), 2 (Fatah-II)
- Maximum firing range: 140–150 km (Fatah-I); 290–400 km (Fatah-II); 750 km (Fatah-IV); 950–1000 km (Fatah-V)
- Main armament: Fatah-I rockets Fatah-II rockets Fatah-III missiles Fatah-missiles; Fatah-V missiles
- Engine: Deutz turbocharged diesel 517 hp (386 kW)
- Suspension: 8×8 wheeled
- Operational range: 140–1000 km
- Maximum speed: Fatah-III: Mach 3–4; Fatah-IV: Mach 0.7

The Fatah (Urdu: فتح, "Victory"), also known as the F-series, is a family of guided multiple rocket launchers (MLRS) developed by Pakistan. It consists of rockets and cruise missiles of different calibres and ranges.

== Development history ==
The Fatah is reportedly a result of Pakistan's efforts to shift the reliance of its armed forces from foreign arms to domestic weaponry. The Ministry of Defence Production revealed a project initiated between 2015 and 2016 which it said was aimed to develop an "extended range MLRS" with teams from Global Industrial Defence Solutions leading the R&D program.

The Fatah-I was first test fired on 7 January 2021, with a stated range of up to 140 kilometers (87 miles). An extended range variant was test fired on 24 August 2021, with an increased range of 150 km. The Fatah-II was test fired on December 27, 2023, with a range of 400 kilometres.

== Deployment ==
The Pakistan Army officially introduced the Fatah into service in 2021 after a series of tests.

The Fatah was first used in combat on 18 January 2024, where it was used to strike militant and insurgent targets and hideouts of the Balochistan Liberation Army and the Balochistan Liberation Front 20 km (12 miles) deep into Iran's Sistan and Baluchestan province, which reportedly killed 9 foreign nationals according to Iran. The strikes were in retaliation for Iranian attacks in Pakistan 2 days earlier which Iran claimed targeted Jaysh al-Adl militants in Pakistan. Such Pakistani strikes were the first known instances of attacks on Iranian soil since the end of the Iran–Iraq War. Both BLA and BLF later acknowledged the deaths of their people in the operation.

During the 2025 India–Pakistan conflict, Pakistan fired Fatah-I and Fatah-II rockets at military targets within India. Indian sources claimed that Indian air defences had intercepted multiple missiles (Fatah I & II) and drones. According to multiple sources Fatah-II long-range missile was intercepted near the Sirsa Air Force Station early on May 10, 2025. Missile debris were later recovered from multiple locations in India, including Sirsa, Haryana and Jalandhar, Punjab.

== Variants ==
=== Fatah-I ===
Fatah-I was the first ever rocket in the Fatah series.

=== Fatah-II ===
The Fatah-II is a longer-range and more advanced version of the Fatah-I. The Fatah-II is mounted on a Chinese Taian TAS5450 eight-wheel drive chassis, providing enhanced mobility and operational flexibility. It integrates satellite and inertial navigation systems.

On 28 April 2026, the Pakistan Army Rocket Force Command conducted a training test launch of the Fatah-II, the first one since the rocket had been upgraded to missile. The ISPR said in an official statement that the launch was witnessed by senior officers from the SPD, Pakistan Army and ARFC, and also by with scientists and engineers of multiple Strategic Organizations.

=== Fatah-II ER ===
The Fatah-II ER is a extended-range hypersonic missile developed and test-launched by the Pakistan's Army Rocket Force Command (ARFC). It was announced by ISPR on 13 October 2026, it builds upon the baseline Fatah-II guided weapon system to strike deep targets and evade enemy defenses. The missile was test fired on the same day.

=== Fatah-III ===
On 7 May 2026, Fatah-III supersonic cruise missile was unveiled by Pakistan Armed Forces' media wing, the Inter-Services Public Relations, during a press briefing on the first anniversary of Operation Bunyan al-Marsoos. The top speed of the missile is reported between Mach 3-4.

The missile was successfully test fired on 18 November 2026.

=== Fatah-IV ===
In September 2025, Pakistan announced its first "training launch" of the land-based surface-to-surface Fatah-IV cruise missile. The army's media wing (ISPR) described the test as "successful", saying that the test was witnessed by senior military officials as well as scientific teams involved in the missile's development. The indigenously developed missile covered a reported range of 750 kilometres during the test, matching previously published range claims and is equipped with "advanced avionics and navigational aids," and it employs a terrain-hugging flight profile intended to reduce the risk of radar detection. It formed a major part of the arsenal of the Pakistan Army's then-newly established Army Rocket Force Command.

On 14 May 2026, Pakistan conducted another training launch of its Fatah-IV ground-launched cruise missile. According to the Pakistan Armed Forces' media wing (ISPR), the missile was equipped with advanced avionics as well as state-of-the-art navigational aids and was capable of engaging long-range targets with high precision. It also stated that "The training fire was conducted to enhance operational efficiency of the troops and validate technical parameters of various sub-systems incorporated for improved accuracy and enhanced survivability". In a statement from 28 April, ISPR stated that launch was witnessed by senior officers from the Pakistan Army and ARFC along with scientists and engineers from NESCOM. President Asif Ali Zardari, Prime Minister Shehbaz Sharif, Chief of Defence Forces and Chief of Army Staff Field Marshal Asim Munir, Chief of Naval Staff Admiral Naveed Ashraf, Chief of Air Staff Air Chief Marshal Zaheer Ahmad Baber Sidhu, Interior Minister Mohsin Naqvi, as well as Deputy Prime Minister and Foreign Minister Ishaq Dar all had congratulated and commended the ARFC for the successful training launch of the F-IV cruise missile. The test had been conducted just 4 days after the 1-year anniversary of the Operation Bunyan al-Marsoos.

=== Fatah-V ===
In 2026 it was reported that Pakistan was to test the Fatah-V, with an expected range of 950–1000 km.

== Operators ==
- Pakistan Armed Forces
  - Pakistan Army
    - Regiment of Artillery Corps (until 2025)
    - Army Rocket Force Command (since 2025)

== See also ==
- Babur (cruise missile)
- Ra'ad (air-launched cruise missile)
  - Ra'ad II
- Taimoor
- P282 SMASH
- List of missiles of Pakistan
- List of missiles by country
