= PNS Tippu Sultan =

PNS Tippu Sultan may refer to one of the following ships of the Pakistan Navy:

- PNS Tippu Sultan (D49), the former British O-class destroyer HMS Onslow (G17); acquired by the Pakistan Navy in 1949; served until 1979
- PNS Tippu Sultan (D168), the former American Gearing-class destroyer USS Damato (DD-871) launched in 1945; acquired by the Pakistan Navy in 1980; scrapped in 1994
- PNS Tippu Sultan (D185), the former British Type 21 frigate HMS Avenger (F185); acquired by the Pakistan Navy in 1994 and expended as a target in 2020
- PNS Tippu Sultan (F263), a Type 054A/P frigate
