= HQ-11 =

Chinese air defense system

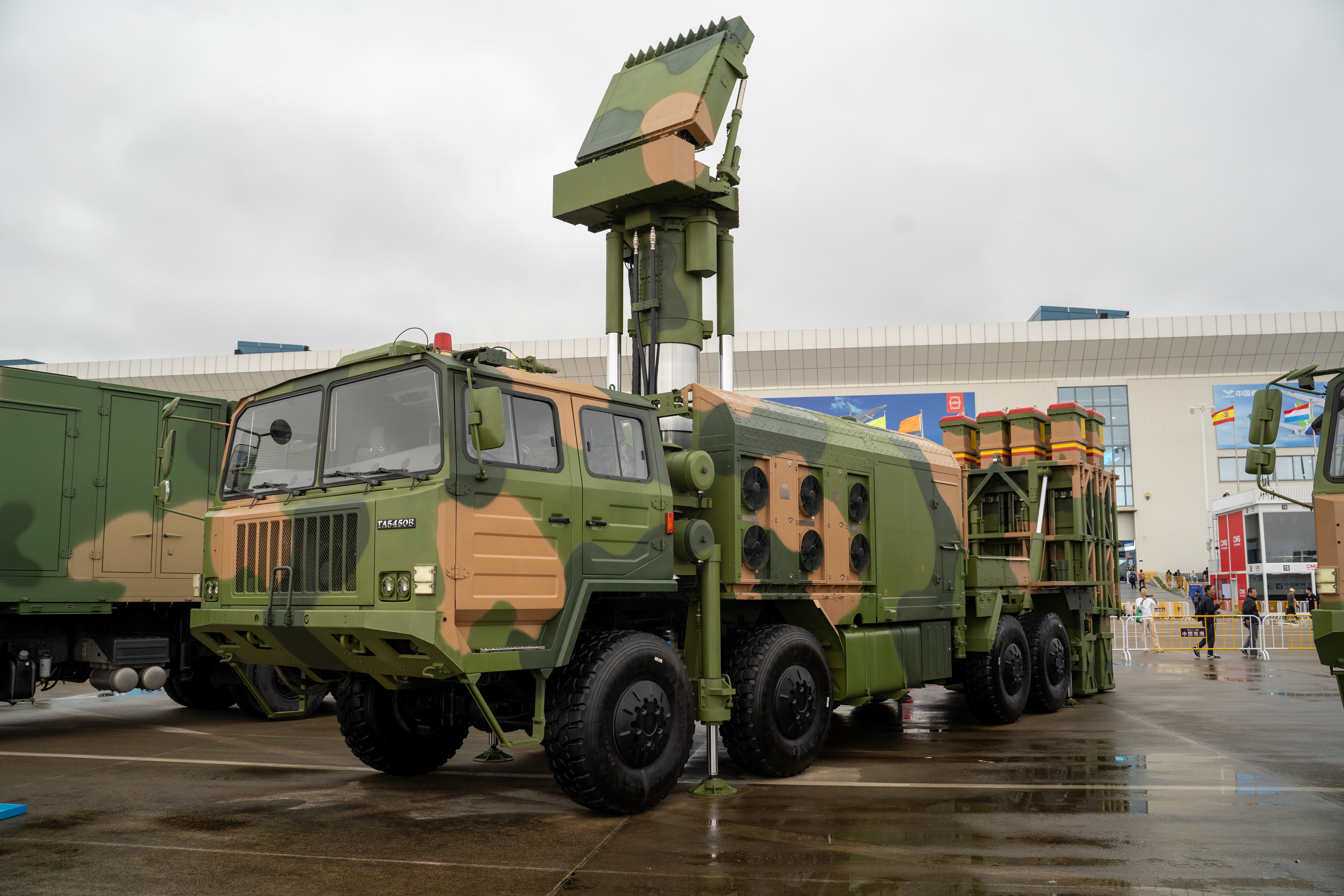
- HQ-11 in Zhuhai airshow 2024
- Type: Surface-to-air missile
- Place of origin: People's Republic of China

Service history
- In service: 2022–present

Specifications
- Detonation mechanism: impact / proximity
- Engine: rocket motor
- Propellant: solid fuel

HQ-11 is a mobile short-to-medium range combined air defense missile and gun system designed for terminal air defense. Designated as the "universal terminal defence system" in Zhuhai Airshow 2022.

An export version, FM-3000, was unveiled in 2014.

== Description ==
The HQ-11 terminal defense system consists of a missile launcher vehicle, LD-3000 (Type 1130) close-in weapon system and a radar surveillance vehicle. The carrier vehicle of the missile launcher is an 8×8 wheeled transporter erector launcher (TEL), which is fitted with eight square canisters as vertical launch cells.

The engagement range is 30 kilometres (19 mi) against aircraft and 20 kilometres (12 mi) against missiles. Each air defense battery has a rotating rotary phased-array radar and four launch vehicles and can handle 32 different targets simultaneously. Guidance system for the missile included inertial guidance, command guidance, and terminal active radar homing.

The HQ-11 is meant to replace HQ-6A air defense system with better target engagement capability, as the latter is not armed for increased threats from missiles and unmanned aerial vehicles on the battlefield. The HQ-6A system has three vehicles: a canted 4-cell launcher vehicle with HQ-6D missiles, a close-in weapon system (CIWS) vehicle with a 6-barrel LD-2000 anti-air gun, and a search vehicle with mechanical radars. The HQ-11 system reduced the formation to two vehicles; the primary vehicle combines a more responsive 8-cell vertical launch system with onboard active electronically scanned array (AESA) radar and air surveillance control room, and the secondary vehicle is equipped with an 11-barrel LD-3000 CIWS gun. All components of the HQ-11 system are mounted on the Taian 5450B chassis.

== Variants ==
HQ-11
Domestic version, combining eight vertical-launched FM-3000 missiles with LD-3000 CIWS.
FM-3000
Export version, first unveiled at Zhuhai Airshow 2014.
FM-3000N
Navalized export version, first unveiled at Zhuhai Airshow 2014. It can be quad-packed in the Chinese naval vertical launch system cell.

== See also ==
- HQ-6
