= Pakistan Army Air Defence Corps =

Pakistan army staff corps for anti-aircraft warfare

- Insignia of Army Air Defence
- Founded: 1948; 78 years ago
- Country: Pakistan
- Branch: Pakistan Army
- Type: Combined and Combat support service
- Role: Administrative and staffing oversight.
- Size: corps
- HQ/Garrison: Army GHQ in Rawalpindi, Punjab in Pakistan.
- Nickname: ADC
- Colors identification: Black, Yellow
- Anniversaries: 1948
- Engagements: Military history of Pakistan

Commanders
- Director-General: Maj-Gen. Sarfraz Ahmad
- Notable commanders: Gen. Ehsan ul Haq

Insignia
- War Flag: Flag of Army Air defense Corps

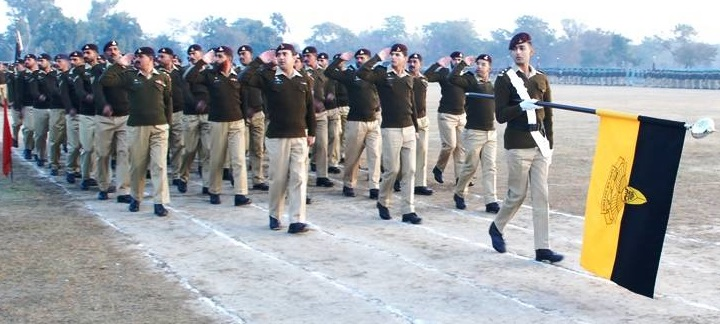
An Army Air Defence Regiment lowers the Regimental Flag during march past

The Pakistan Army Corps of Air Defence is a military administrative and combat service support branch of the Pakistan Army. Reporting directly to the Army GHQ. As of early 2026, the Commander of the Pakistan Army Air Defence Command (AADC) is Lieutenant General Muhammad Zafar Iqbal.

== Overview ==
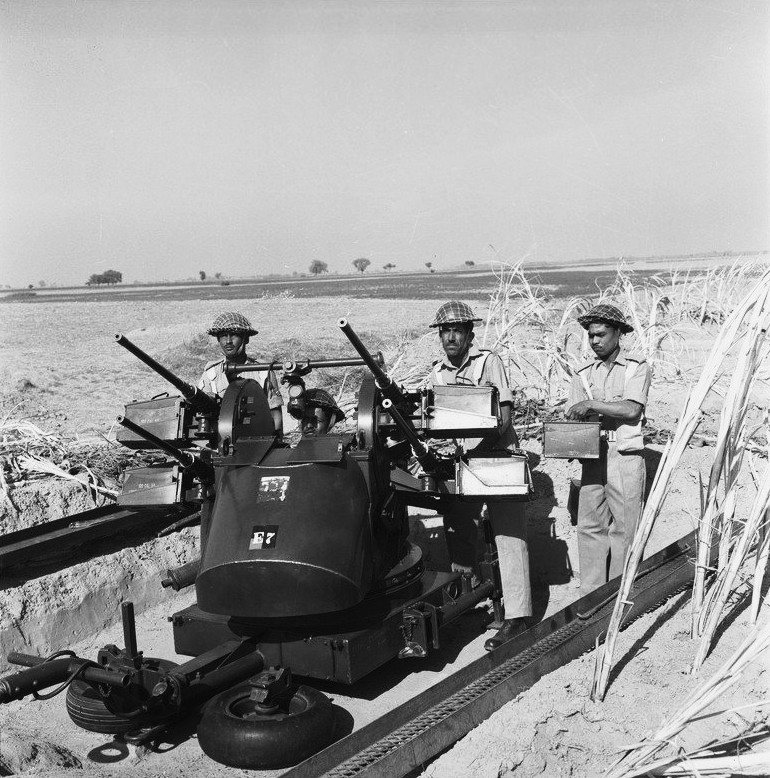
The Pakistan Army troops operating a M45 Quadmount during the 1965 conflict with India.

The Pakistan Army Air Defence Corps was commissioned into the Pakistan Army as an administrative staff branch from the partition of the former British Indian Army's Corps of Army Air Defence, and it was inspected by then-Governor-General Muhammad Ali Jinnah on 21 February 1948.

The Pakistan Army Air Defence Corps provides an effective air defense against the foreign threats by employing anti-aircraft tactics to defend the airspace of the country. Since its commissioning as an administrative corps, the army air defense is structured in regimental composition and has twelve active regiments.

The education and training for the personnel to be commissioned in the corps of army air defence is provided at the School of Army Air Defence (SAAD) located in Malir Cantonment in Karachi, Sindh. The corps is commanded by the director-general, usually serving as an active-duty two star rank, major-general, working under the Chief of the General Staff at the Army GHQ in Rawalpindi, Punjab, Pakistan.

== Units ==
- 1 LOMAD
- 2 LOMAD
- 3 LOMAD (Born To Win) (Al Daqeeq)
- 4 HIMAD
- 5 Light Air Defence Regiment (Fakhar-e-Quaid)
- 6 Light Air Defence Regiment (Glorious)
- 13 Light AD (The First Pakistani)
- 15 Light AD
- 19 Self-Propelled Air Defence Regiment (19 SP AD)
- 20 Medium Air Defence Regiment (Sky Saviours) (20 Med AD)
- 29 RCG AD (1957) (Rachna Warriors) (Zafarwal 71)
- 36 Lt AD (Sher-e-Jang)
- 41 Medium Air Defence Regiment (41 Med AD)
- 43 Lt AD (Teer-Ba-Hadaf)
- 44 SP AD (The Desert Star)
- 52 LT AD (Eshorad) (Discipline Vigilance Dedication) (Sargodha 71)
- 58 Lt AD (Eshorad) (Fakhar-e-Badin) (Badin 71)
- 67 Lt SP AD
- 74 Lt AD
- 75 RCG AD (Katiba Mujahid)
- 85 Lt AD (Falak Shagaf)
- 88 Lt AD (Mardan-e-Haq)
- 89 SAM (ESHORAD) (The Al Fajr) (The First Eshorad)
- 94 Lt AD (Choranway)
- 95 Lt AD (GM) (Tiara Shikan)
- 96 Lomad (Shaheen Ba Hadaf)
- 97 RCG AD (The Killer Regt/ Zarb-E-Haq)
- 98 RCG (Paasdar-e-Bayyena) (Athanway)
- 100 Lt AD (Centurions)
- 102 Lt AD (Sky Hunters)
- 103 Lt AD
- 104 Lt AD (Fakhar-e-Chaman)
- 123 SCR AD
- 124 SCR AD (Chokas-o-Tayyar)
- 125 SCR AD (Barwaqt O Yaqeeni)
- 126 Lt AD (G/M) Regiment (Victorious)
- 127 medium AD
- 133 RCG AD
- 134 RCG AD
- 135 Missile AD (Falak Shigaaf)
- 136 RCG AD (Aatish Fishan)
- 141 Lt AD(SAM) Regt (The Lightening One)
- 142 Missile AD
- 143 Missile AD
- 144 SP AD
- 145 Lt SP AD
- 146 SP AD (Bahimmat)
- 147 Lt AD
- 148 (SP) Lt AD (AK) (First To Fire) (Chinarees)
- 151 SP AD (The Pioneers) (Chambb)
- 152 Lt AD
- 153 SP AD Regiment (Fakhar-e-Tabuk) (Ek Tarwanja Sher Ka Panja)
- 154 SP AD
- 155 SP AD Infantry Bn (Baloch) (Zarb-e-Katoom)
- 157 Lt AD
- 156 Lt AD (COMP) (Falak Paima)
- 158 Lt AD
- 159 Lt AD
- 160 RCG
- 161 RCG (Nigah Buland)

Key:

- Lt AD = Light Air Defence
- RCG = Radar Control Guns
- SAM = Surface to Air Missile
- SP = Self Propelled

== List of commanders ==
Rank and Name	Start of Term	End of Term
Maj Gen Agha Masood Hassan,	October 1987	September 1991
Lt Gen Nazar Hussain,	September 1991	March 1996
Maj Gen Zahid Ehsan,	March 1996	April 1998
Lt Gen Syed Iftikhar Hussain Shah,	April 1998	August 2000
Lt Gen Khateer Hasan Khan,	August 2000	May 2005
Maj Gen Tahir Mahmud Qazi,	May 2005	October 2006
Lt Gen Muhammad Ashraf Saleem,	October 2006	April 2010
Lt Gen Syed Muhammad Owais,	April 2010	April 2012
Lt Gen Zamir Ul Hassan Shah,	April 2012	December 2013
Lt Gen Muhammad Zahid Latif Mirza,	December 2013	December 2017
Lt Gen Hamood Uz Zaman Khan,	December 2017	December 2021
Lt Gen Muhammad Zafar Iqbal	December 2021	Present
