= Tughril-class frigate =

Class of multi-role warships for the Pakistan Navy

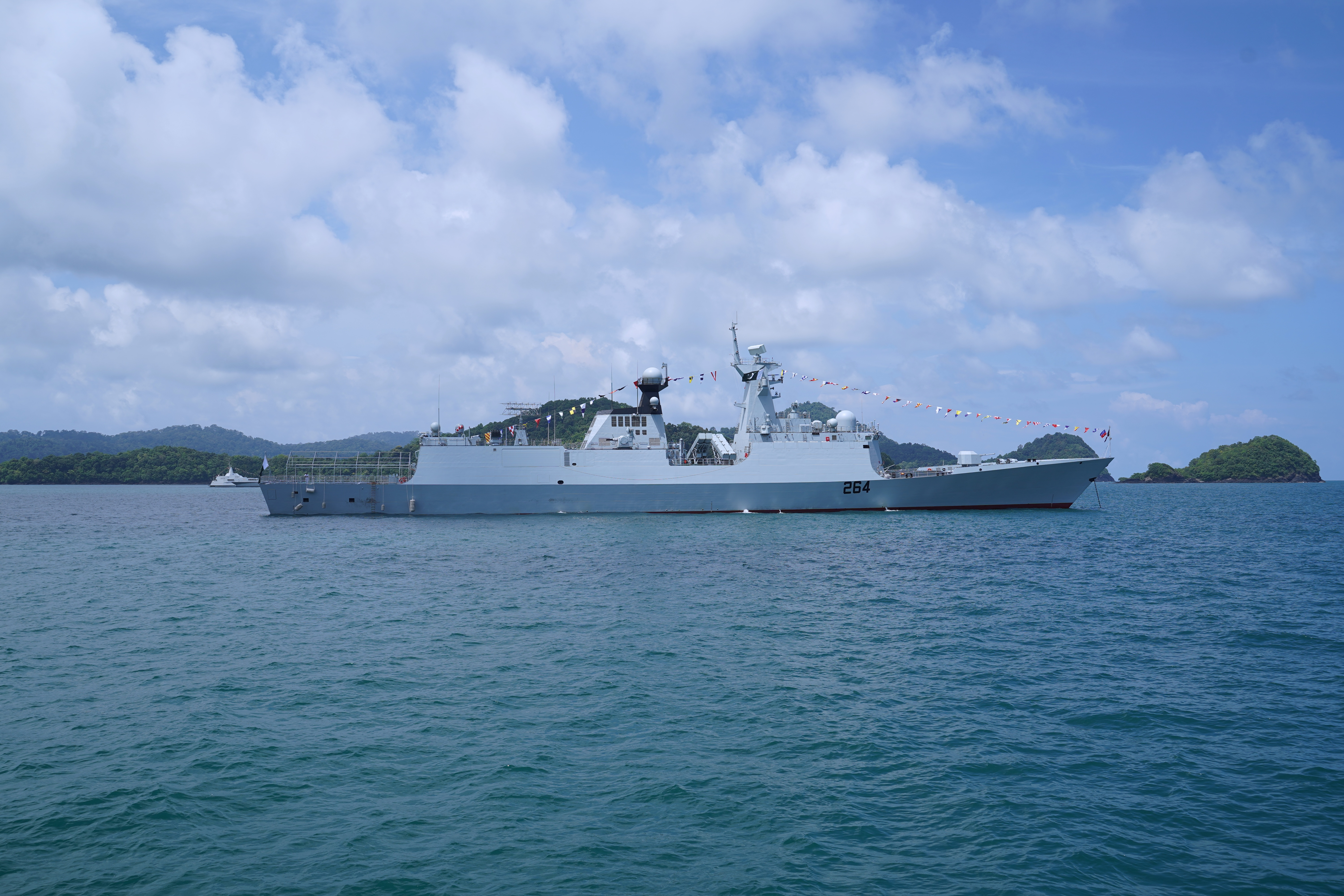
- PNS Shah Jahan (F264)

Class overview
- Name: Tughril class
- Builders: China State Shipbuilding Corporation (CSSC); Hudong-Zhonghua Shipbuilding (HDZH) (Subsidiary of CSSC)
- Operators: Pakistan Navy
- Preceded by: Zulfiquar class
- Cost: USD $348 million (PLAN Type 054A; not confirmed by Pakistan)
- Built: 2018–2023
- In service: 2021–present
- Planned: 4
- Completed: 4
- Active: 4

General characteristics
- Type: Guided-missile frigate
- Displacement: 4,200 t (4,100 long tons)
- Length: 134 m (439 ft 8 in)
- Beam: 16 m (52 ft 6 in)
- Propulsion: CODAD; 4 × Shaanxi Shaanxi 16 PA6 STC diesel engines (Each producing 5700 kW)
- Speed: 27 knots (50 km/h; 31 mph)
- Range: 8,025 nmi (14,862 km; 9,235 mi)
- Complement: 165
- Sensors & processing systems: Radar :-; SR2410C AESA radar.; Type 517 (SUR17B) VHF air-search radar.; Type 344 fire-control radar (for SSM); 4 × MR-90 Front Dome (for SAM); MR-36A surface-surveillance radar; Type 347G fire-control radar (for H/PJ-26 naval gun); 2 × Racal RM-1290 I Band navigation radar; Sonar :-; MGK-335 medium frequency active/passive sonar system; H/SJG-206 towed array sonar; Communications :-; ZKJ-5 combat data-system (developed from Thomson-CSF TAVITAC); HN-900 data link (Chinese equivalent of Link 11); SNTI-240 SATCOM; AKD5000S Ku-band SATCOM
- Electronic warfare & decoys: Type 922-1 radar warning receiver (RWR); HZ-100 ECM/ELINT system; Kashtan-3 missile jamming system
- Armament: Anti-air warfare :-; 1 × 32-cell VLS; LY-80N surface-to-air missiles; Anti-surface warfare :-; 1 × 1-cell P-282 SMASH anti-ship ballistic missile; 2 × 2-cell CM-302 anti-ship missiles; Anti-submarine warfare :-; 2 × Type 87 anti-submarine rocket launcher; 2 × Yu-7 anti-submarine torpedo launchers; Guns :-; 1 × 76mm H/PJ-26 naval gun; 2 × Type 1130 CIWS; Decoys :-; 2 × Type 726-4 decoy-launchers
- Aircraft carried: 1 × Harbin Z-9EC (equipped with CM-501GA land-attack missile)
- Aviation facilities: Flight deck and enclosed helicopter hangar capable of accommodating Harbin Z-9 (or) Kamov Ka-27.
- Notes: Pakistan-specific variant of Type 054A frigate.; Most technologically-sophisticated warships ever exported by China to date.

The Tughril-class frigates, formally classified as the Type 054A/P frigates, are a series of modified guided-missile frigates built by Hudong–Zhonghua Shipbuilding (HDZH), for the Pakistan Navy. The Type 054A/P is a modified derivative of the Type 054A frigate and was specifically customised to meet the operational requirements of the Pakistan Navy; the class features several capabilities – including anti-surface warfare (ASuW), anti-aircraft warfare (AAW), anti-submarine warfare (ASW) and low radar observability. The frigates form the mainstay of the Pakistan Navy's active naval fleet. The class also supplants the obsolete Tariq-class destroyers.

Pakistan's Ministry of Defence (MoD) ordered four frigates – two in 2017 and an additional two in 2018, as part of the Pakistan Navy's collective efforts to augment its capabilities in naval warfare. All four ships of the class have been commissioned. The first two, Tughril and Taimur, were commissioned in January and June 2022, respectively while the last two, Tippu Sultan and Shah Jahan were commissioned in May 2023.

== History ==
=== Background ===
The Pakistan Navy had long evinced interest in purchasing Chinese-origin vessels; the service is known to have operated Chinese-origin naval platform since the 1970s. In 2001, Pakistan purchased the Zulfiquar-class frigates (F-22P) – a series of four frigates based on the design of the Chinese-origin Type 053H3 frigate.

After the Zulfiquar class, Pakistan was reportedly interested in possibly procuring the Type 054A frigate; the Pakistan Navy had also had several encounters with the frigate since 2009; it is believed that the service's experience of operating with the vessel may have been a deciding factor in later purchasing it.

=== Purchase ===
In October 2017, Muhammad Zakaullah, the-then outgoing-chief of the Pakistan Navy, disclosed that Pakistan had purchased Chinese-origin frigates; however, he did not specify the type of the frigates that had been purchased.

In December 2017, the Pakistan Navy clarified that it had purchased the Type 054A in June 2017 and that an option for two more vessels was being considered.

In June 2018, Pakistan ordered two more Type 054A frigates from China Shipbuilding Industry Corporation (CSIC), as a follow-up to its earlier purchase from 2017, bringing its order to a total of four frigates. While neither the Pakistan Navy nor CSIC disclosed the per-unit price of the vessels, it is believed that one vessel may cost around USD $348 million.

=== Construction ===
The construction of the first frigate of the series began at HDZH's Shanghai-based shipyard in 2018; the vessel was later launched in an elaborate ceremony, on 22 August 2020 – with representatives of the Pakistan Navy in attendance. The vessel began its sea trials in May 2021, before being delivered in November 2021. Noticeably, the construction period lasted only 14 months.

The steel-cutting ceremony for the second frigate was conducted in December 2018, while the keel was laid in March 2020. The vessel was launched on 29 January 2021 and was commissioned on 23 June 2022.

The steel-cutting ceremonies for the third and fourth frigates were conducted in November 2019, while the keel of the third frigate was laid in May 2021. Both frigates were also launched in 2021; the third frigate was launched on 3 August, while the fourth frigate was launched on 31 December. Both the frigates were commissioned on 10 May 2023.

== Overview ==
=== Armament ===
The Tughril class possesses a diverse-range of ordnance dedicated to different spheres:

- Anti-surface warfare

As part of its anti-surface warfare (ASuW) capabilities, the class carries CM-302 anti-ship cruise missiles, reportedly capable of supersonic-speeds of up to Mach 3. The CM-302 has often been compared to the BrahMos anti-ship missiles, operated by the Indian Navy – given the missiles' similarity in terms of speed and capabilities.

Reports have also stipulated that the frigates may be equipped with the CM-401 anti-ship ballistic missile, capable of traversing at hypersonic speeds; however, this is yet to be confirmed. In 2025, the Pakistan Navy successfully tested the P282 SMASH ballistic missile by launching it from a Tughril-class frigate.

The class also features one "PJ-26" 76 mm (3.0 in) naval gun, primarily for neutralizing surface, or aerial targets.

- Anti-air warfare

As part its anti-air warfare (AAW) capabilities, the class features the LY-80N medium-range surface-to-air missiles (SAM), with a reported range of up to 70 km (43 mi).

The class also features two 11-barrel 30 mm (1.2 in) Type 1130 close-in weapon systems (CIWS), primarily for neutralizing aerial and surface targets.

- Anti-submarine warfare

As part of its anti-submarine warfare capabilities, the class features two Type 87 six-tube anti-submarine rocket launchers and two 324 mm (12.8 in) Yu-7 anti-submarine torpedoes.

- Decoys

The class features two Type 726-4 18-tube decoy rocket launchers.

- Aviation facilities

As part of its aviation facilities, the frigates are equipped with the Harbin Z-9EC naval helicopter – the Pakistani-specific anti-submarine (ASW) variant of the Harbin Z-9C, operated by the People's Liberation Army Naval Air Force; the Z-9EC will also be equipped with the CM-501GA land-attack missiles – with a reported range of 40 km (25 mi). The frigates can also be equipped with specialised Z-9D variant of the helicopter, which can carry up to four YJ-9/YJ-9E small air-to-surface light anti-ship missiles, or alternatively CM-501GA land-attack/anti-ship missiles.

The frigates are equipped with a flight-deck and an enclosed aviation hangar, capable of accommodating a single Z-9 or the Kamov Ka-27 medium-lift helicopter, or unmanned aerial vehicles (UAV).

=== Naming ===
The Tughril class has been christened after Tugrul I, one of the founders of the Seljuk Empire – a Turko-Persian empire which ruled of over what is present-day Iran, Iraq, Syria, and Turkey – during the 11th and 14th centuries. Reportedly, the lead vessel of the class is the third warship in the Pakistan Navy to bear the name Tughril, after an O-class destroyer from 1951 and a Gearing-class destroyer from 1980.

The class is designated as the "F-22P Batch II", by the Pakistan Navy.

=== Comparison to Type 054A frigates ===
Although the Type 054A/P frigate operated by the Pakistan Navy (PN) is based on the Type 054A frigate operated by the People's Liberation Army Navy (PLAN), both designs have several differences, with respect to automation and weaponry.

The Type 054A/P possesses the following systems, which are absent on the Type 054A :-

- Radar :
  - SR2410C active electronically scanned array (AESA) radar.
  - Type 517 (SUR17B) VHF air-search radar.
- Weaponry :
  - 4 x CM-302 anti-ship missiles.

Nevertheless, the Type 054A/P retains the Type 054A's design – including its sloped hull, radar absorbent materials, and a clean profile.

== Operational history ==
Following its initial commissioning in Shanghai on 8 November 2021, Tughril embarked on its maiden voyage to Pakistan, making port-calls to the Philippines, Malaysia and Sri Lanka.

Tughril made its first port-call to the Philippines, arriving in Manila on 22 November 2021 for a two-day goodwill visit. Tughril then proceeded to visit Malaysia, arriving at Lumut Naval Base on 6 December; the vessel also participated in a joint Pakistani-Malaysian bilateral naval exercise with the Royal Malaysian Navy, dubbed "MALPAK-III", on 11 December.

Tughril then visited Sri Lanka, arriving in Colombo on 13 December for a four-day goodwill visit, before participating in a bilateral naval exercise with the Sri Lanka Navy, dubbed "Lion Star", on 18 December. The vessel would later arrive in Karachi on 20 December.

=== Commissioning ===
Tughril was formally commissioned into the Pakistan Navy on 24 January 2022, at the Karachi Naval Dockyard, with Pakistan's president – Arif Alvi and the chief of the Pakistan Navy – Amjad Khan Niazi, in attendance. The formal commissioning of Tughril coincided with the induction of ten second-hand WS-61 Sea King naval helicopters into the Pakistan Naval Air Arm.

The second frigate, PNS Taimur, was commissioned on 23 June 2022, at the Hudong Zhonghua shipyard in Shanghai, with Commodore Rashid Mehmood Sheikh, the head of the Pakistan Navy's Chinese mission, in attendance.

The third and fourth frigates, PNS Tippu Sultan and PNS Shah Jahan respectively, were commissioned on 10 May 2023, at the Hudong Zhonghua shipyard in Shanghai.

== Ships in the class ==
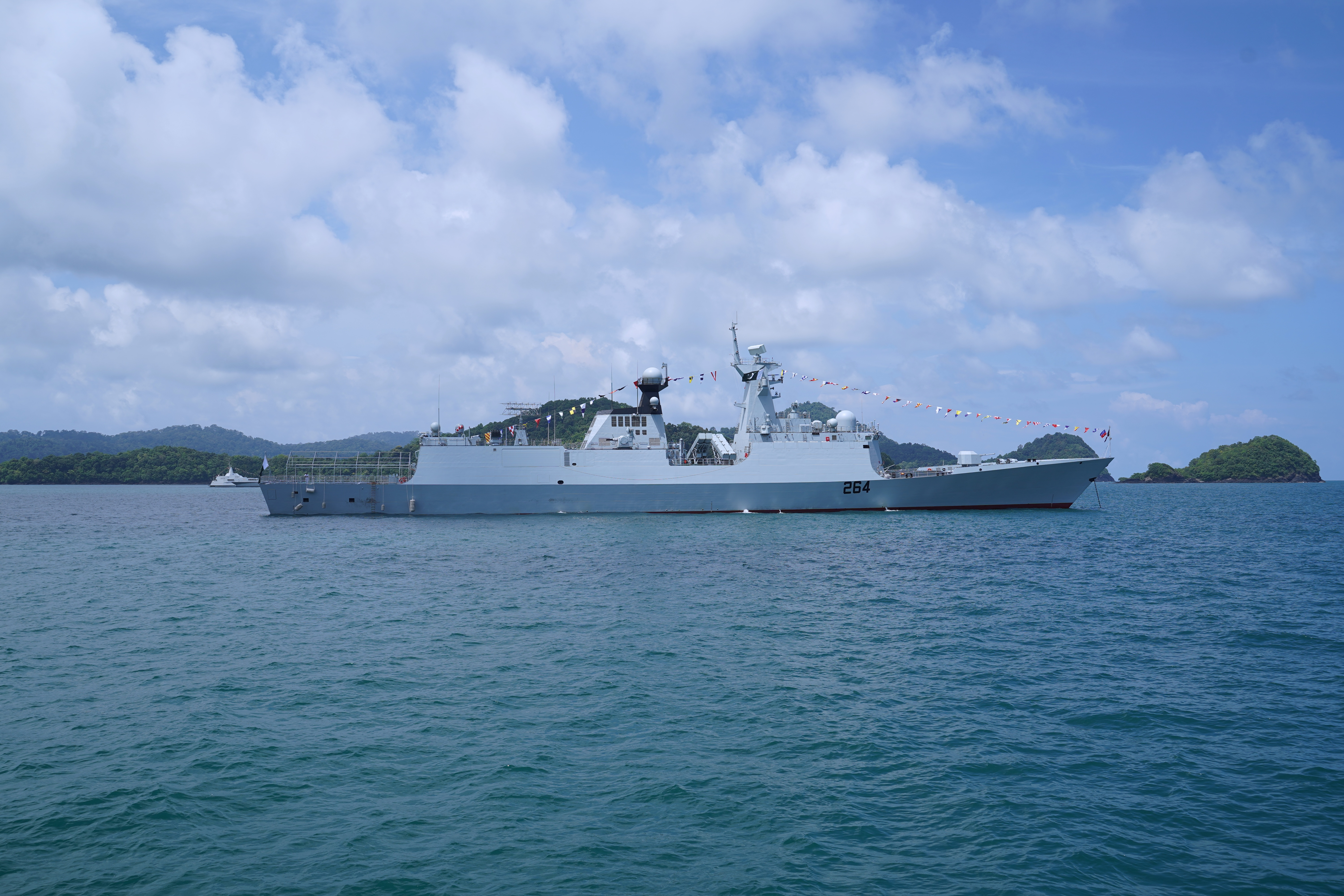
PNS Shah Jahan (F264) in Langkawi for LIMA 2023.

| Pennant Number | Name | Builder | Launched | Commissioned | Status |
|---|---|---|---|---|---|
| 261 | Tughril | Hudong–Zhonghua Shipbuilding | 22 August 2020 | 24 January 2022 | Active |
| 262 | Taimur | Hudong–Zhonghua Shipbuilding | 29 January 2021 | 23 June 2022 | Active |
| 263 | Tippu Sultan | Hudong–Zhonghua Shipbuilding | 3 August 2021 | 10 May 2023 | Active |
| 264 | Shah Jahan | Hudong–Zhonghua Shipbuilding | 23 December 2021 | 10 May 2023 | Active |

== See also ==
=== Frigates of comparable configurations and capabilities ===
- Nilgiri-class frigate – A class of guided-missile frigates currently being built for the Indian Navy.
- Shivalik-class frigate – A class of guided-missile frigates currently operated by the Indian Navy; the predecessor to the Nilgiri class.
- FREMM multipurpose frigate – A series of multi-purpose frigates, operated by the French Navy, the Italian Navy, the Royal Moroccan Navy, the Egyptian Navy and currently being built for the United States Navy and the Indonesian Navy.
- Type 26 frigate – A class of frigates currently being built for the Royal Navy, the Royal Canadian Navy and the Royal Australian Navy.
- MKS 180 frigate – A planned class of frigates that are to be built for the German Navy.
- Daegu-class frigate – A class of guided-missile frigates currently being built for and operated by the Republic of Korea Navy.
- Mogami-class frigate – A class of multi-mission frigates currently being built for the Japan Maritime Self-Defense Force.
- F110-class frigate – A planned class of multi-purpose frigates that are to be built for the Spanish Navy.
- Admiral Gorshkov-class frigate – A class of guided-missile frigates operated by the Russian Navy.

=== Other references to the Pakistan Navy ===
- List of active ships in the Pakistan Navy.
