= Saadi Town =

Saadi Town سعدی ٹاؤن
- Country: Pakistan
- Province: Sindh
- City District: Village
- Union Councils: 6

Saadi Town (Urdu: سعدی ٹاؤن) is a residential neighborhood of Malir Cantt in City, Sindh, Pakistan. The developer of the Saadi Town is Pakland Housing Projects. Saadi Town is located on the Eastern region of the city, and has experienced rapid population growth during last five years. Saadi Town is few minutes drive from the M-9 motorway.

== Saadi Shirazi ==
Saadi Town is named after the famous Persian poet Saadi Shirazi who wrote Bostan and Gulistan.

== Layout ==
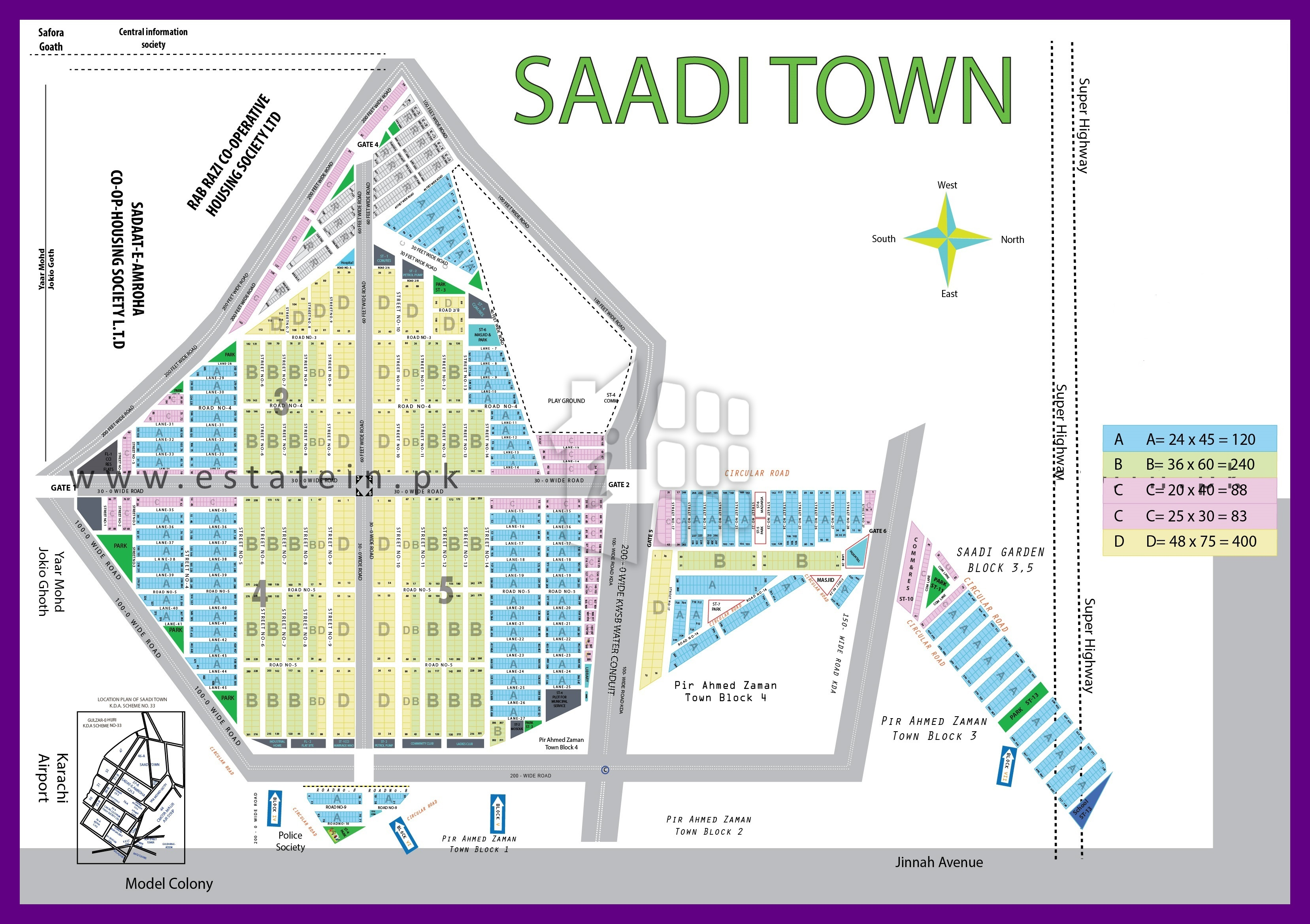
Saadi Town Layout

== Suburb ==
The suburb residents distance from the urban center still gives them access to basic necessities and amenities, including a hospital with Community Center, secondary and high schools, officer's mess, guest hotel, playground, and soccer stadiums, parks, protected forests, multiple markets, Largest Hub of Real Estate Agents in scheme 33, and weekly bazaars.

== Demography ==
There are several ethnic groups in Saadi Town including Muhajir, Punjabis, Kashmiris, Pakhtuns, Sindhis, Balochs, Memons, Bohras and Hindko.

== See also ==
- Saadi Garden
- Gadap Town
- Malir Cantonment
- Gulshan-e-Osman
