= 5 Light Air Defence (SAM) Regiment =

5 Light Air Defence Regiment " Fakhr-E-Quaid" is the second oldest Regiment of the Pakistan Army Air Defence Corps.

As 5 Light Anti-Aircraft Regiment, Indian Artillery, the regiment fought in Burma with Fourteenth Army (United Kingdom) during World War II.

After the Partition of India in August 1947, the regiment was allocated to Pakistan and was made part of the Regiment of Artillery. It shifted from Pune to Karachi Lines in Malir Cantonment and was placed under command 2 AGRPA (2 Army Group Royal Pakistan Artillery). It was equipped with QF 3.7-inch AA guns. On 21 February 1948 while it was still part of the Regiment of Artillery, Quaid-e-Azam Mohammed Ali Jinnah, First Governor-General of Pakistan, visited the unit along with 6 Light Anti-Aircraft Regiment. The regiment was somewhat under strength as its Hindu and Sikh soldiers had been sent back to the new, separate Indian Army.

Later the regiment was reequipped with surface-to-air missiles.

From 1989 both the regiments became part of the Pakistan Army Air Defence Corps.
