= PNS Taimur =

PNS Taimur may refer to following ships of Pakistan Navy:

- PNS Taimur (1954), the former British C-class destroyer HMS Chivalrous (R21) acquired by Pakistan in 1954 and returned to the Royal Navy in 1961 prior to scrapping.
- PNS Taimur (166), the former United States Gearing-class destroyer USS Epperson (DD-719) acquired by the Pakistan Navy in 1977 and renamed. She was sunk as a target in 1980.
- PNS Taimur (F262), a Type 054A/P frigate
