= Gulshan-e-Osman =

Gulshan-e-Osman Owner : Taha ahmed bhatti گلشن عثمان
- Country: Pakistan
- Province: Sindh
- City District: Karachi
- Union Councils: 6

Gulshan-e-Osman (Urdu: گلشنِ عثمان) is a new residential neighbourhood of Gadap Town in Karachi, Sindh, Pakistan.

There are several ethnic groups in Gulshan-e-Osman including Muhajirs, Sindhis, Punjabis, Kashmiris, Seraikis, Pakhtuns, Balochis, Memons, Bohras, Ismailis, etc. Over 99% of the population is Muslim. The population of Gadap Town is estimated to be nearly one million.The owner of the colony is Haji Osman Jokhio (Late).

== See also ==
- Gadap Town
- Saadi Town
- Sanober cottages
- Malir Cantonment
