= TA5450/TAS5450 =

Chinese missile launcher

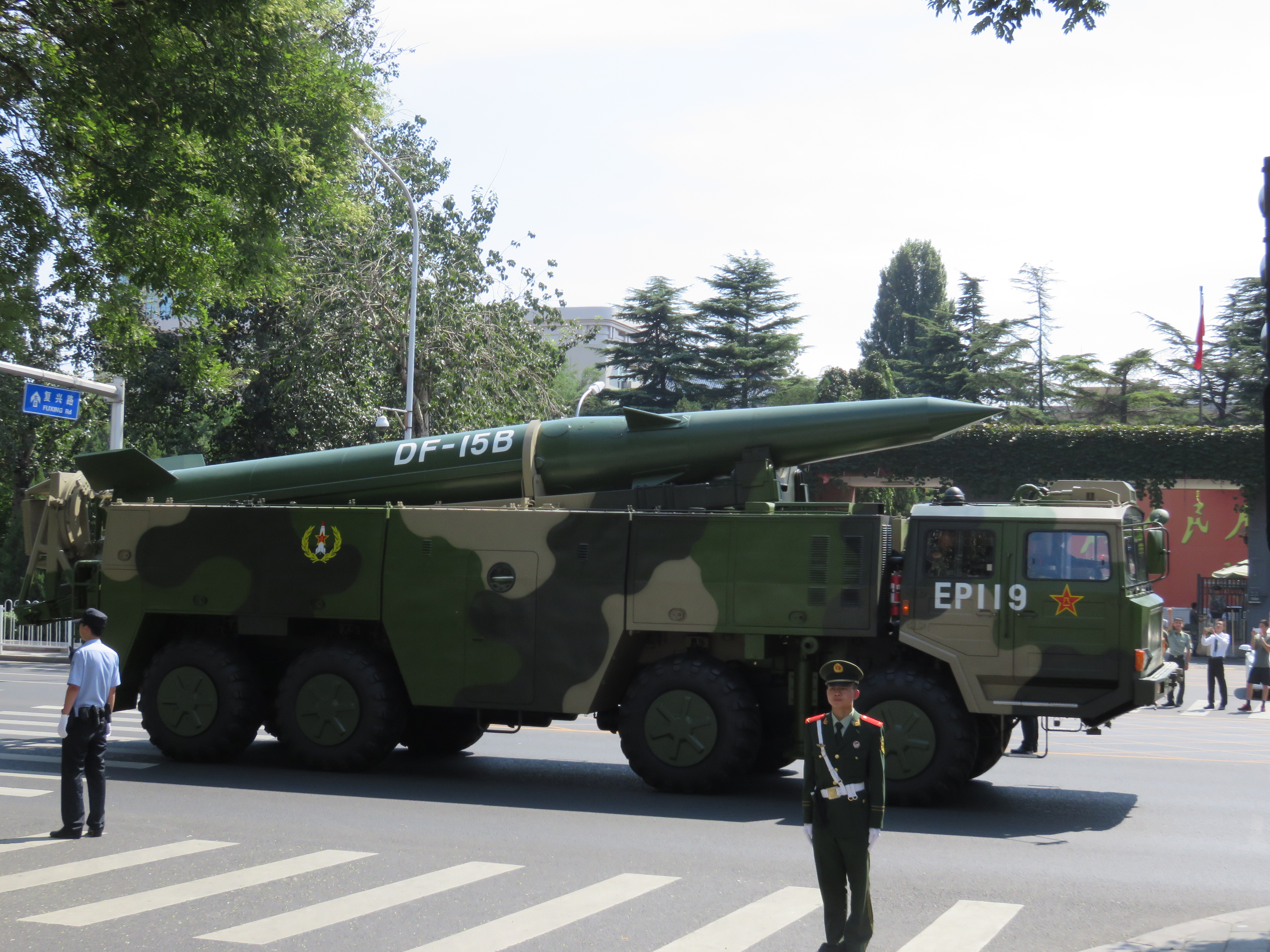
- TA5450/TAS5450 carrying a DF-15
- Type: 8×8 heavy tactical truck/transporter erector launcher
- Place of origin: China

Service history
- Used by: PLA Rocket Force

Production history
- Designer: Taian Special Vehicle Company
- Manufacturer: Taian Special Vehicle Company

Specifications
- Mass: 25 t (empty)
- Length: 12m
- Width: 3m
- Height: 3m
- Crew: 1+5
- Engine: Deutz turbocharged diesel 517 hp (386 kW)
- Payload capacity: rated at 25 tons
- Operational range: 800 km (497 mi) loaded
- Maximum speed: 80 km/h (50 mph)

The TAIAN TA5450/TAS5450 is a 25 ton transporter erector launcher that primarily carries ballistic missiles. However, it is also able to carry other weapon systems such as rockets and conventional missiles. Despite sometimes being called the TA5450, the actual official designation of the vehicle is the TAS5450. The TA5450 is actually the designation of the vehicle's base chassis, while the TAS5450 refers to the vehicle itself.

== Description ==
The TA5450/TAS5450 is an 8x8 TEL configuration. As it is around the same size as its cousin, the TA580/TAS5380 and the WS2400, the relatively small size of the TA5450/TAS5450 means that it could only carry a maximum payload equal to the curb weight of the vehicle itself. Contrast this to the much larger WS2500 and the WS2600, which could mount far heavier payloads due to the larger size of the TELs.

Because of its payload, the TA5450/TAS5450 primarily carries the DF-15B and the DF-15C short range ballistic missiles. However, it is just as possible for the TA5450/TAS5450 to carry the A200, A300 and the WS-2 rocket systems.

It has also been reported that Sudan has acquired the TA5450/TAS5450 TEL systems.

== Variants ==
- TA5450B - carries HQ-11 missiles and LD-3000 close-in weapon system.
- TA5350 - carries HQ-16 air defense missiles
- TA4360 - tank transporter with 6x6 configuration
- TA4410 - longer version of the TA4360 with an added axle, exported to Venezuela
- TA5570 - special wheeled chassis with 10x10 configuration that carries ballistic missiles
- TA5690 - special wheeled chassis with 12x12 configuration that carries MRBMs and IRBMs
- TA5801 - special wheeled chassis with 14x14 configuration that carries IRBMs and ICBMs
- TA5920 - special wheeled chassis with 16x16 configuration that carries ICBMs

== See also ==
- TA580/TAS5380
- WS2400
