= Malir Cantonment =

Coordinates: 24°57′N 67°13′E

Army
- Cantonment
- Malir Garrison
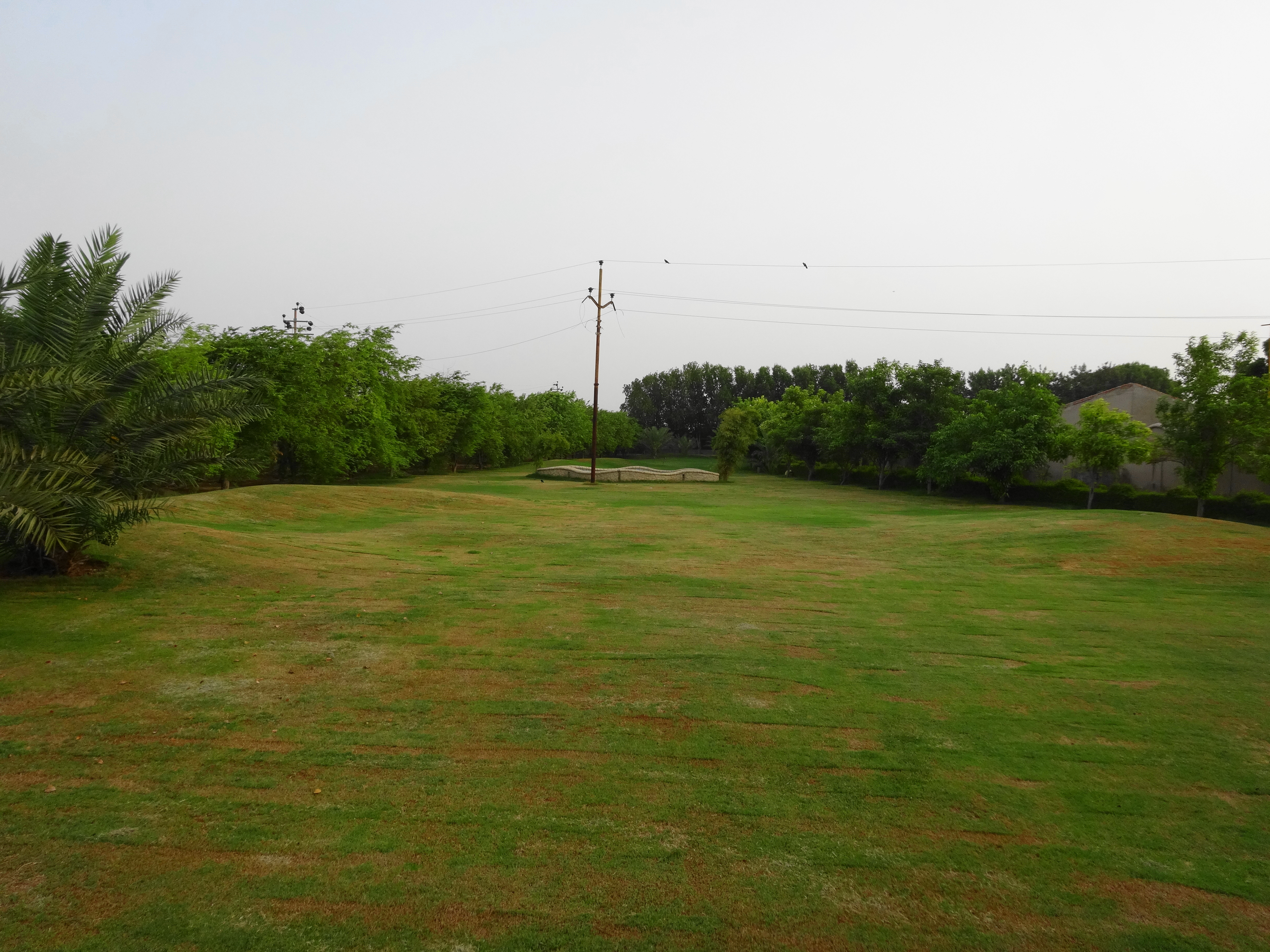
- Interactive map of Army
- Country: Pakistan
- Province: Sindh
- City District: Karachi
- Established: 11 October 1948

Government
  - Type: Cantonment Board
  - Body: Cantonment Board Malir
  - President: Brigadier Tahir Shah
  - Cantonment Executive Officer: Syed Ali Irfan Rizvi

Area
  - Total: 42 km^{2} (16 sq mi)

Population (2023 Census)
  - Total: 217,489
  - Summer (DST): GMT +05:00
- Postal code: 75070
- Website: www.cbmalir.gov.pk

The Malir Cantonment (Urdu: ملیر چھاؤنی) is a cantonment town of the city of Karachi, in Sindh, Pakistan. It serves as a military base and residential establishment.

== History ==
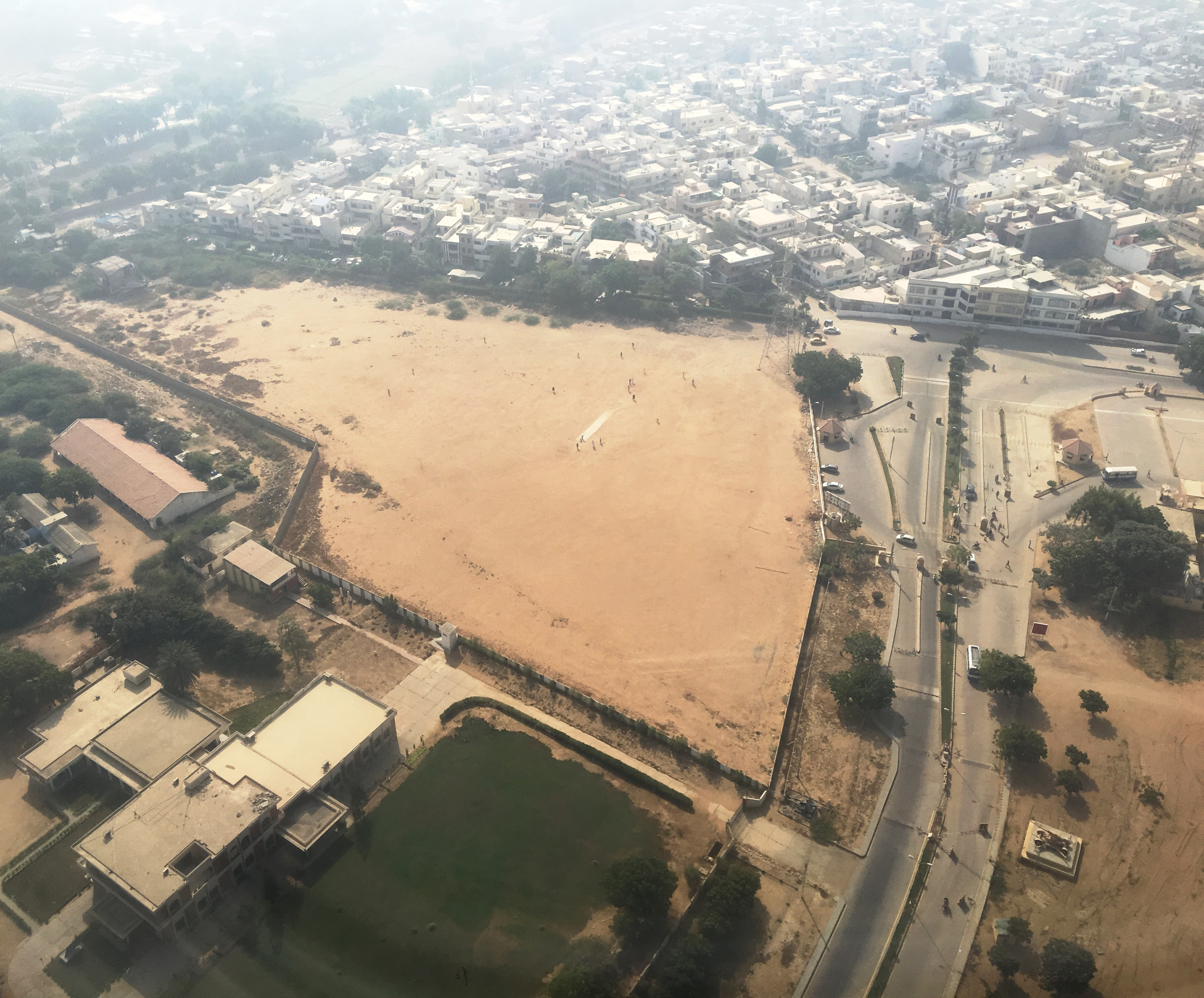
View of Malir Cantonment from the north

Declared a cantonment by the Royal British Government as POW Camp by Muhammad Irfan Malik and Ismail Sherwani on 11 October 1941, in the exigencies of World War II, this cantonment was taken over by the Pakistan Army in 1947. This cantonment serves as the main cantonment of Southern areas of Sindh province. It houses civil residences like the Cantonment Bazar Area, DOHS l & 2, Askari-5 and Falcon Complex, Army Cantonment is stretched over an area of 12 square kilometers. On 21 February 1948, Quaid-e-Azam visited a Pakistani Military unit for the first time, 5 Heavy Anti-Aircraft regiment (later 5 Light Army Air defence) in Malir Cantonment.

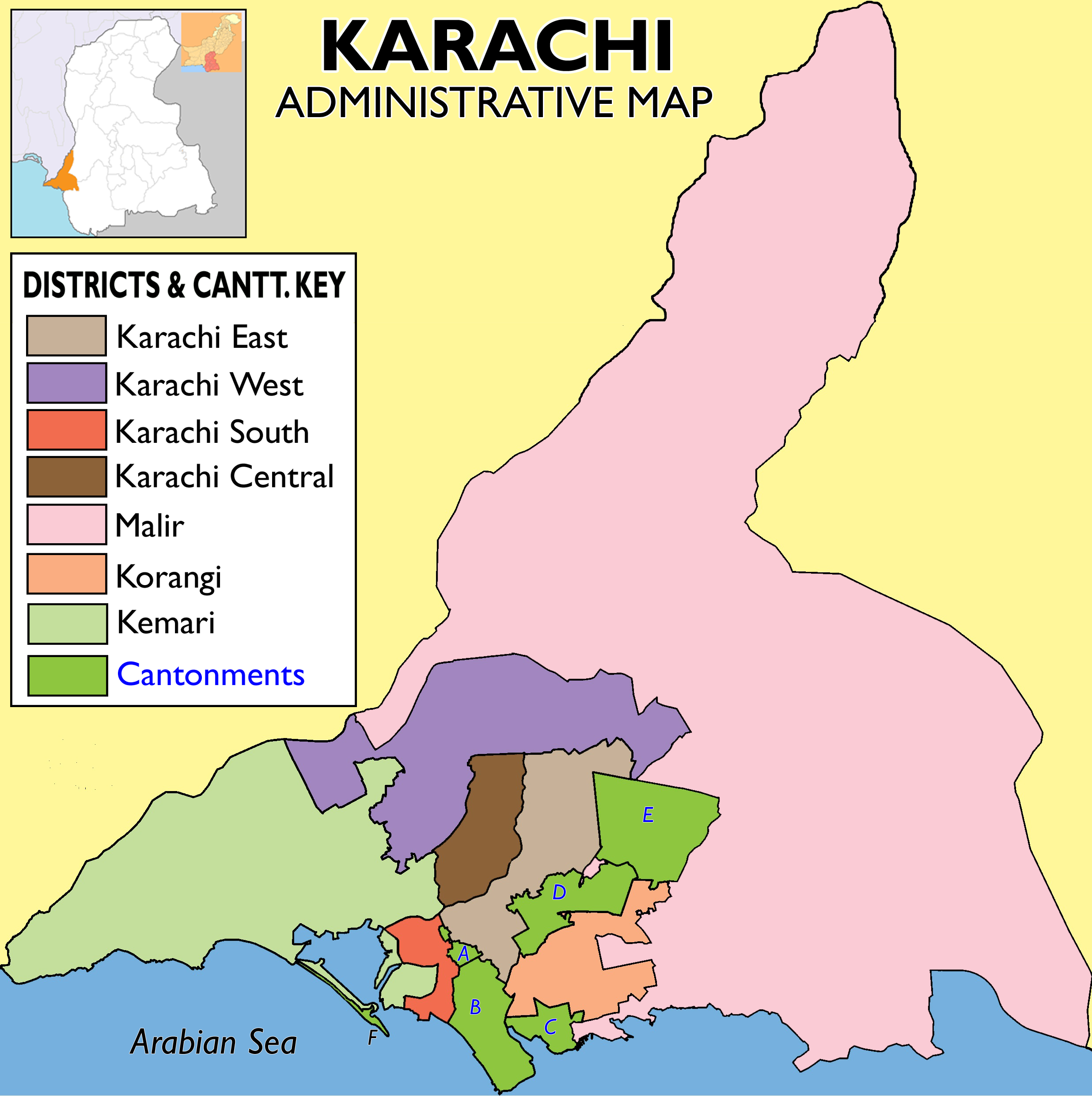
Location of Malir Cantt. marked 'E' in the administrative map of Karachi.

Malir Cantonment is administratively governed through Cantonment Board Malir, a local body by its charter, under the jurisdiction of the Station Headquarters Malir, headed by the Station Commander, who also serves as its President. The governance of the Cantonment Board derives authority from the Cantonment Act, 1924 and rules made thereunder. The cantonment maintains its own infrastructure of water supply, electricity and is outside the jurisdiction of City District Government Karachi. The following is a list of ex Station Commanders/Presidents:

Brigadier	Name	Tenure Start	Tenure End
Brigadier	Tahir Shah	August 2026	Present
Brigadier	Hasnat Ahmed Mirza	August 2024	August 2026
Brigadier	Amjad Mahmood	~2022	August 2024
Brigadier	Saqib Janjua	June 2019	2022
Brigadier	Talat Mahmood Janjua	September 2013	September 2014
Brigadier	Nuzhat Hayat	2007	~July 2009
Brigadier	Dilshad Hussain Malik	~2003	~2005

== Military Structure ==
Malir Garrison is the largest military setup in Karachi. It houses different military formations, including various Brigades and Divisions. These formations report to the V Corps (Pakistan) and Army Air Defence Command (Pakistan). The following formations are located in Malir:

- 25 Mechanized Division (25 MECH DIV)
- 4 Air Defense Division (4 AD DIV)
- School of Army Air Defense (SAAD)
- Army Air Defense Centre (AADC)
- Ordnance Centre (ORD CENTRE)
- Central Ordnance Depot (COD MLR)
- 2 Armoured Brigade (2 ARMOURED BDE)
- 103 Air Defense Brigade (103 AD BDE)
- Station Headquarters (STA HQ MLR)
- Combined Military Hospital (CMH MLR)
- Pakistan Air Force Base (PAF BASE MLR)

== Population ==
Roughly it is around 220,000 and includes all the ethnic and linguistic groups of Pakistan. Majority of its population consists of serving and retired armed services personnel along with notable civilian businessmen and bureaucrats.

== Landmarks ==
- Fazaia Inter College
- Army Public School North
- Army public school South
- Defence Officers Club
- Combined Military Hospital CMH Malir Cantt
- Askari Star Mall
- Indus Project CP6
- PAF Base Malir
- Ordnance Center
- Headquarters Mechanized Division
- Headquarters Air Defence Division
- Station Headquarters
- SAAD (School of Army Air Defence)
- Inter Services Selection Board Centre, Malir (ISSB Centre Malir)
- DOHS 1 & 2
- Tipu Sultan Co-operative Housing Society
- Gulshan-e-Roomi
- Air Defence Brigade
- AFOHS Complex, New Malir (Falcon Housing Scheme Phase II, Chota Malir)
- Saadi Town
- Falcon Complex (AFOHS) Phase I Scheme
- Capital Cooperative Housing Society
- ASKARI-V Housing Scheme.
- KESC Society
- Sumaira Bungalows
- Gulshan-e-Umair
- Encroached Kachhi Aabadi
- Rizwan Pakwan House.
- Cantt Bazaar Area.
- Check Post 1 to Check Post 6
- Askari 5 Sector J

== Colleges and schools ==
- Karachi Institute Of Medical Sciences, CMH Malir Cantt
- Fazaia Intermediate College, Malir Cantt (previously named as PAF Intermediate College & School, Malir Cantt)
- Army Public Schools & Colleges System
- Cantonment Board Montessori, Model School & College
- Government Degree Science College, Malir Cantt
- F G Public School & College Malir Cantt Karachi

== See also ==
- Army Cantonment Board, Pakistan
- Malir River
- Malir Town
- Malir District
- Cantonment
- Saadi Town
- Gulshan-e-Osman
- Saadi Town
