= P282 SMASH =

Pakistani anti-ship ballistic missile

Supersonic Missile Anti-SHip (SMASH)
- Type: Anti-ship ballistic missile (ASBM)
- Place of origin: Pakistan

Service history
- In service: 2024–present
- Used by: Pakistan Navy

Production history
- Designer: Maritime Technologies Complex
- Designed: 2010-2025
- Manufacturer: Maritime Technologies Complex

Specifications
- Length: ~9 m (30 ft)
- Diameter: 85–90 cm (33–35 in)
- Effective firing range: 350 km (217 mi); Extended-range: 450–500 km (280–311 mi); Export variant: 290 km (180 mi)
- Warhead: Single conventional HE/ICM
- Propellant: Solid-fuel
- Guidance system: Inertial, Terminal
- Launch platform: Ship: Guided-missile frigate

The P282 Supersonic Missile Anti-SHip (SMASH) is a Pakistani ship-launched anti-ship ballistic missile (ASBM) capable of engaging both land and sea targets, with an officially stated range of 350 km (217 mi) and anti-access/area-denial (A2/AD) capabilities. Extended-range variants of the SMASH have reportedly reached ranges of 450–500 km.

== Development ==
Development of the SMASH was first revealed by the former chief of the Pakistan Navy (PN), Admiral Zafar Mahmood Abbasi, who said in a 2020 speech at a change-of-command ceremony that the PN was developing the P282 missile, which he described as a hypersonic ship-launched anti-ship/land-attack ballistic missile. The missile shares many similarities with the Fatah-II missile.

== Deployment ==
The indigenously developed SMASH missile's first public test flight was carried out by the Pakistan Navy (PN) in November 2024, in which it was successfully launched from a Zulfiquar-class frigate toward a land target. Another successful test was carried out in November 2025, in which the SMASH was launched from a Tughril-class frigate and struck a sea target this time. Yet another successful test was carried out in April 2026, in which the missile was launched from a Babur-class corvette and hit a sea target at "extended range."

== Design ==
According to Janes, the SMASH appears to have a diameter of 85–90 centimetres (33–35 in) and a length of about 9 metres (30 ft). The Pakistan Navy stated that the supersonic missile is "equipped with a state-of-the-art navigation system and maneuverability features," and that it can be employed against land and sea targets "with high precision."

== See also ==
- Persian Gulf (missile)
- Harbah (cruise missile)
- CM-302
