= HQ-16 =

Chinese medium-range surface-to-air missile

HQ-16 / LY-80
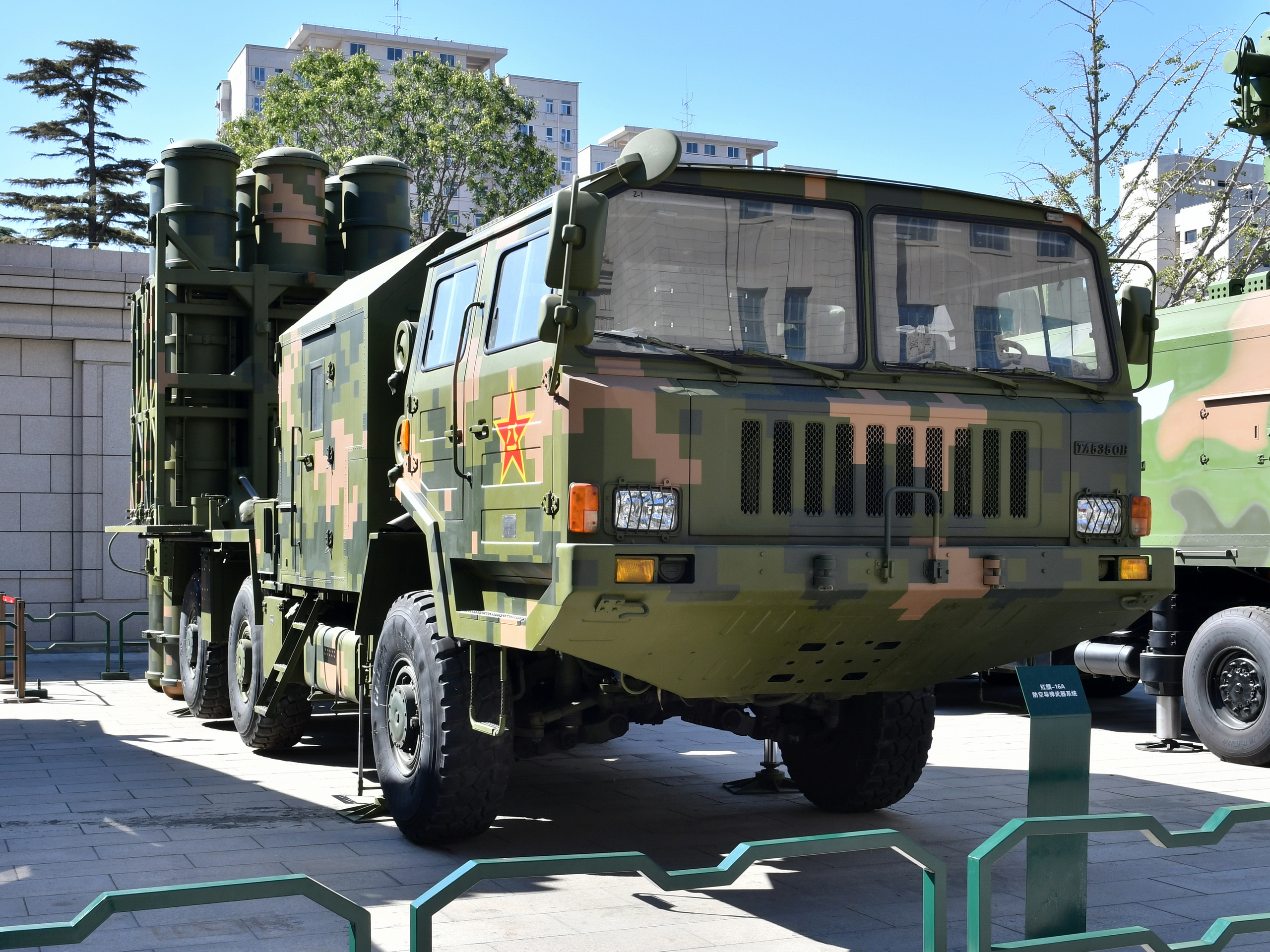
- HQ-16A ground launcher
- Type: Surface-to-air missile
- Place of origin: People's Republic of China

Service history
- In service: 2008–present
- Used by: Primary user: China; See Operators section for others

Production history
- Manufacturer: Shanghai Academy of Spaceflight Technology (SAST)

Specifications
- Detonation mechanism: impact / proximity
- Engine: rocket motor
- Propellant: solid fuel
- Operational range: 40 kilometres (25 mi) (HQ-16/HQ-16A) (slant); 70 kilometres (43 mi) (HQ-16B); 160 kilometres (99 mi) (HQ-16FE)
- Flight altitude: 15m to 27km (HQ-16FE)
- Guidance system: Semi-active radar homing
- Launch platform: Transporter erector launcher Ship

The HQ-16 (simplified Chinese: 红旗-16; traditional Chinese: 紅旗-16; pinyin: Hóng Qí-16; lit. 'Red Banner-16'; NATO reporting name: CH-SA-16) is a Chinese medium-range surface-to-air missile (SAM) developed by the Shanghai Academy of Spaceflight Technology (SAST) of China Aerospace Science and Technology Corporation (CASC). It is derived from earlier versions of the Russian Buk missile system.

== Development ==
Development began in 2005, and was reportedly assisted by the Almaz-Antey Corporation. It was initially developed as a naval system. In late-2011, China reported the "co-development between Russia and China" of the missile was complete.

The HQ-16B was developed by late-2011.

A ground battery consists of a command post, two multifunction radars, and four to six launchers. Each launcher has six missiles.

The HQ-16 is effective in intercepting tactical ballistic missiles.

== Operational history ==
The platform for the HHQ-16, the Type 054A frigate, entered service in 2008. The HQ-16A entered service in 2011.

The HQ-16A entered Chinese service in 2011.

Pakistan entered negotiations to purchase the missile in 2015. The LY-80s entered service with the Pakistan Army in March 2017. HQ-16s were integrated into a networked air defense system and deployed during the 2025 India–Pakistan conflict.

== Variants ==
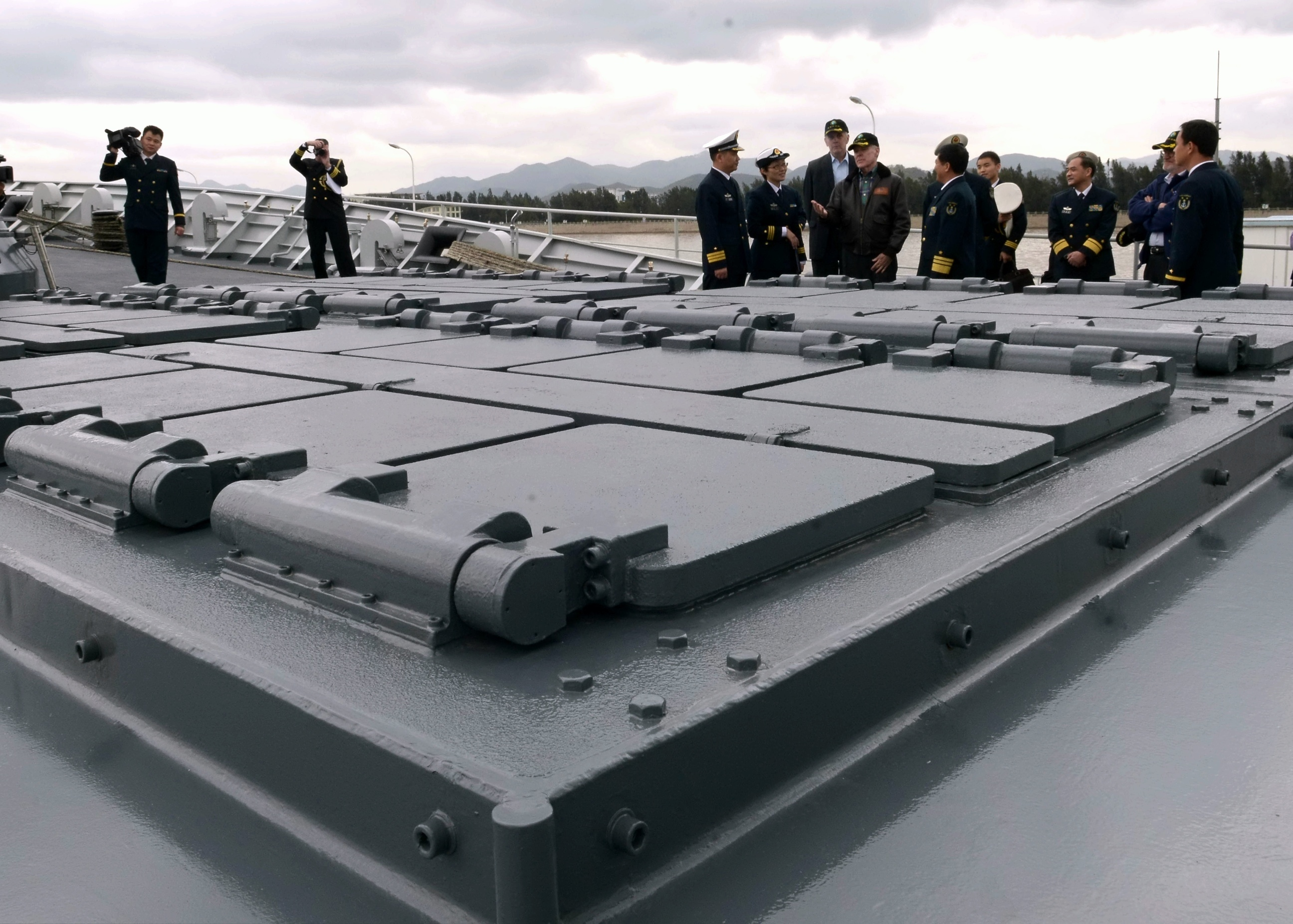
Naval HHQ-16 vertical launchers onboard Type 054A frigate.

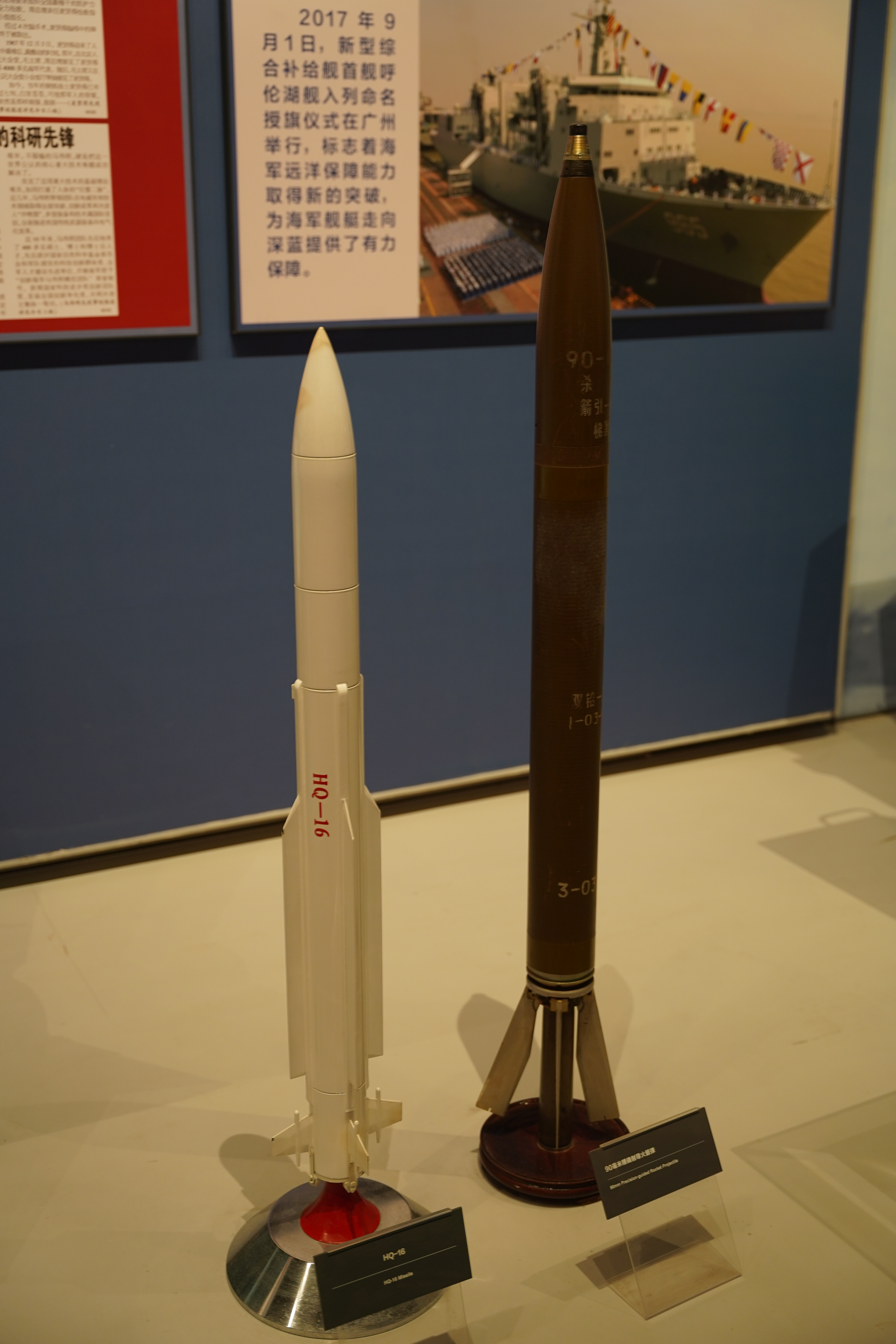
HQ-16 missile (left) on display at the PLA Naval Museum in Qingdao.

HQ-16A
Original land-based variant with a range of 40 kilometres (25 mi).
HHQ-16
Naval variant, reportedly a domestic-produced variant of the 9M317ME missile.
HQ-16B
Improved variant with slant range exceeding 70 kilometres (43 mi).
HQ-16C
Improved variant with slant range exceeding 70 kilometres (43 mi).
HHQ-16C
Improved extended-range naval variant.
LY-80
Export variant.
LY-80N
Export naval variant.
HQ-16FE
Improved variant with range up to 160 kilometres (99 mi).

== Operators ==
China

- People's Liberation Army Ground Force – 250 HQ-16A & HQ-16B
- People's Liberation Army Navy – HHQ-16

Pakistan

- Pakistan Army – LY-80
- Pakistan Navy – LY-80N
- Pakistan Air Force – HQ-16FE

== See also ==
- HQ-7
- HQ-9
- HQ-20
- HQ-22

== Sources ==
- Einhorn, Robert; Sidhu, W.P.S. (March 2017). The Strategic Chain: Linking Pakistan, India, China, and the United States (PDF) (Report). Arms Control and Non-Proliferation Series. Brookings Institution.
- The International Institute for Strategic Studies (2022). The Military Balance 2022. Routledge. ISBN 978-1-03-227900-8.
- Schwartz, Paul (August 2015). Russia's Contribution to China's Surface Warfare Capabilities: Feeding the Dragon (PDF). Rowman & Littlefield. ISBN 978-1-4422-5879-2.
- United States Department of the Army (9 August 2021). Chinese Tactics (PDF). Army Techniques Publication. Washington, D.C. 7-100.3.
