= YJ-12 =

YJ-12 / CM-302
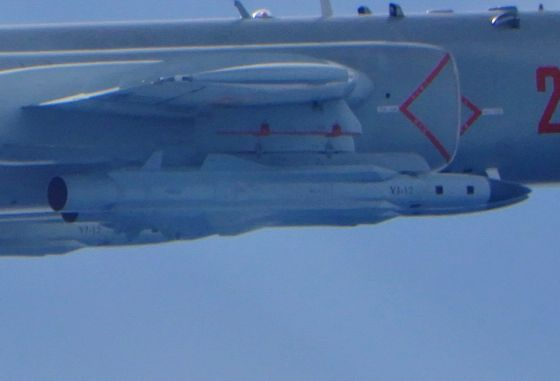
- Xi'an H-6 Strategic bomber armed with YJ-12 supersonic anti-ship cruise missiles
- Type: Anti-ship cruise missile Land-attack cruise missile
- Place of origin: China

Service history
- In service: c.2011–present
- Used by: People's Liberation Army Air Force; People's Liberation Army Navy; Pakistan Navy; Algerian National Navy

Production history
- Manufacturer: China Aerospace Science and Industry Corporation (CASIC)

Specifications
- Warhead: 205–500 kg (452–1,102 lb)
- Engine: Integrated Ramjet/Booster propulsion system
- Operational range: 250–270 nmi (290–310 mi; 460–500 km)
- Maximum speed: Mach 2.5 to 4
- Guidance system: BeiDou satellite navigation with mid-course updates, terminal active radar homing
- Launch platform: Ship-launched; TEL-launched; Air-launched

The YJ-12 (Chinese: 鹰击-12; pinyin: yīngjī-12; lit. 'Eagle Strike 12') is a Chinese supersonic anti-ship cruise missile manufactured by China Aerospace Science and Industry Corporation (CASIC).

== Description ==
The YJ-12 resembles a lengthened Kh-31-type missile. According to the United States, the air-launched (YJ-12) and ship-launched (YJ-12A) variants have 270 nmi (310 mi; 500 km) ranges. Speeds of Mach 2.5 to 4 have been reported. The YJ-12 may perform evasive maneuvers to avoid anti-missile threats.

According to War on the Rocks, a ship has 45 seconds to engage a YJ-12 after sea-skimming missile appears over the horizon and is detected. In 2014, the United States Navy (USN) intended to counter air-launched YJ-12 saturation attacks by destroying Chinese strike aircraft at long range before the missiles are launched; the tactic relies on Cooperative Engagement Capability.

== Development ==
In August 2000, the Chinese unveiled a model of an air-launched missile labeled as the YJ-91, resembling the French Air-Sol Moyenne Portée. Later, a similar-looking missile was seen that may have been designated as the YJ-12. The YJ-91 designation ultimately went to the Chinese development of the Russian Kh-31.

The YJ-12 appeared at the 2015 China Victory Day Parade, indicating that the missile had entered active service since all weapons showcased during the parade are actively inducted prior to the parade.

The YJ-12A was reportedly in development in 2014. The YJ-12A entered service around 2020 aboard refitted Type 051B and Sovremenny-class destroyers of the People Liberation Army Navy.

The YJ-12B was reportedly deployed to the Spratly Islands around April 2018. They may cover the southern half of the South China Sea when based on three largest Chinese-controlled islands.

== Variants ==
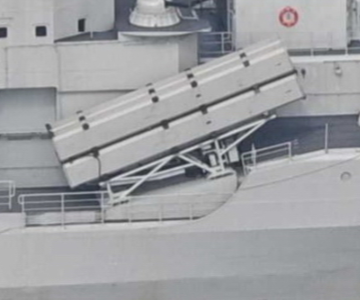
YJ-12A anti-ship missile launcher

YJ-12
Air-launched variant with a 270 nmi (310 mi; 500 km) range.

YJ-12A
Ship-launched variant with a 270 nmi (310 mi; 500 km) range.

YJ-12B
Land-based variant with a 250 nmi (290 mi; 460 km) range.

CM-302
Export variant. According to the China Aerospace Science and Industry Corporation, it is an anti-ship and land-attack missile with a 280 km (170 mi; 150 nmi) range, a 250 kg (550 lb) warhead, and launched from air, land, and naval platforms The missile uses BeiDou satellite navigation, with active radar terminal guidance; the target may be updated by data-link.

== Operators ==
=== Current operators ===
Algeria

- Algerian National Navy, CM-302 (land-based)

Pakistan

- Pakistan Navy, CM-302 (ship-launched)

China

- People's Liberation Army Air Force
- People's Liberation Army Navy
  - People's Liberation Army Navy Coastal Defense Force

== See also ==
Related development

- YJ-15
- YJ-18
- HD-1

Comparable missiles

- 3M-54 Klub – (Russia)
- BrahMos – (India, Russia)
- P-800 Oniks – (Russia)
- Future Cruise/Anti-Ship Weapon – (France, Italy, United Kingdom)
- ASM-3 – (Japan)
- Yun Feng – (Taiwan)
